= Alfred Sohn-Rethel (painter) =

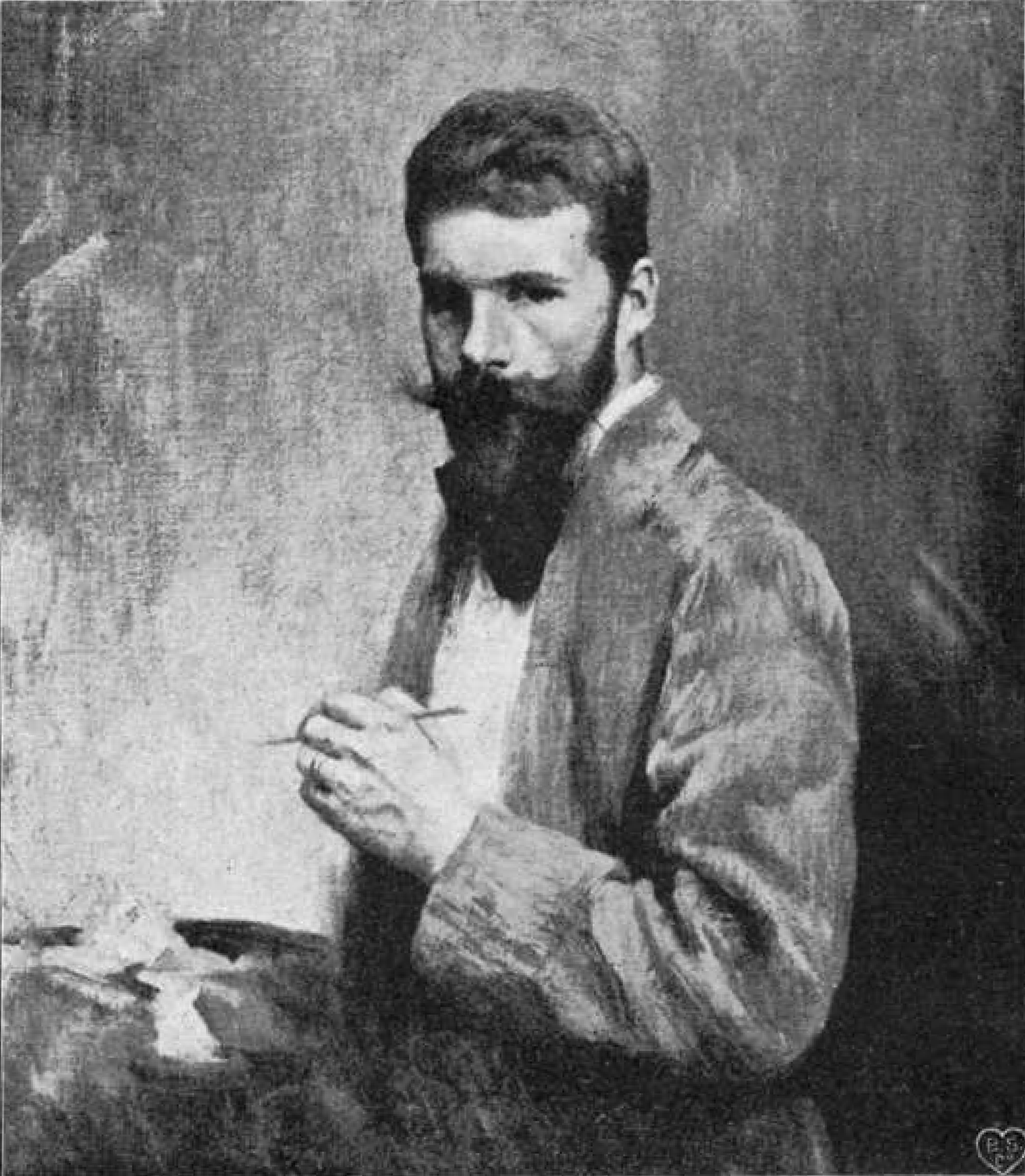
- Alfred Sohn-Rethel, Self-portrait (c. 1899)
- Born: 8 February 1875; Düsseldorf, German Empire
- Died: 10 December 1958 (aged 83); Tübingen, West Germany
- Education: Kunstakademie Düsseldorf
- Spouse: Anna Julie Michels
- Children: 3
- Parents: Karl Rudolf Sohn (father); Else Sohn-Rethel (mother)
- Relatives: Otto Sohn-Rethel (sibling); Karli Sohn-Rethel (sibling); Werner Heuser (brother-in-law)

Alfred Sohn-Rethel (8 February 1875 – 10 December 1958) was a German Modernist painter of the Düsseldorf school of painting art movement. He was active in Düsseldorf, Berlin, Paris, and Barbizon.

== Biography ==
Alfred Sohn-Rethel was born 8 February 1875 to painters Else Sohn-Rethel (née Rethel) and Karl Rudolf Sohn and was raised in Düsseldorf, Germany. He came from a family of painters many of which were of the Düsseldorf school of painting, his maternal grandfather was history painter Alfred Rethel, his maternal great grandfather was miniature painter and portraitist, August Grahl. His paternal grandfather was Karl Ferdinand Sohn.

He attended the Kunstakademie Düsseldorf (Düsseldorf Art Academy) in May 1888, and studied with artists Eduard von Gebhardt, Hugo Crola, Adolf Schill, and Johann Peter Theodor Janssen.

In 1893, Sohn-Rethel met his future spouse, Anna Julie Michels while staying at Lake Garda. They married on 8 October 1896 in Hanover, Germany. He moved in 1897 to Paris, which changed his painting style. On 8 December 1897, his eldest child Anna Clara Marie Elisabeth "Lissi" Sohn-Rethel was born. His other two children were Marxist economist and philosopher Alfred Sohn-Rethel (1899–1990) and painter and actor Hans-Joachim Sohn-Rethel (1905–1955).

In 1909, Alfred Sohn-Rethel co-founded the Sonderbund group with other Düsseldorf painters, which included Julius Bretz, Max Clarenbach, August Deusser, Walter Ophey, Wilhelm Schmurr, and his brothers Otto Sohn-Rethel and Karli Sohn-Rethel. They held their first exhibition in May 1908 and brought German painting to the French Impressionists. He was a member of the Deutscher Künstlerbund (Association of German Artists).

He died in Tübingen, Germany, on 10 December 1958.

Sohn-Rethel's work is in various public museum collections including Städel Museum, the British Museum, Museu Nacional d'Art de Catalunya, among others.
