= Karli Sohn-Rethel =

German Modernist painter

- Born: Carl Ernest Sohn-Rethel; 1882; Düsseldorf, German Empire
- Died: 1966 (aged 83–84); Düsseldorf, West Germany
- Burial place: Nordfriedhof Düsseldorf
- Other names: Karl Ernest Sohn, Karl Sohn-Rethel, Karli Sohn, Karl Ernest Sohn-Rethel, Carli Sohn-Rethel
- Education: Kunstakademie Düsseldorf
- Occupation: painter
- Movement: Classic Modernism, Düsseldorf school of painting
- Parents: Karl Rudolf Sohn (father); Else Sohn-Rethel (mother)
- Relatives: Alfred Sohn-Rethel (sibling), Otto Sohn-Rethel (sibling), Werner Heuser (brother-in-law)

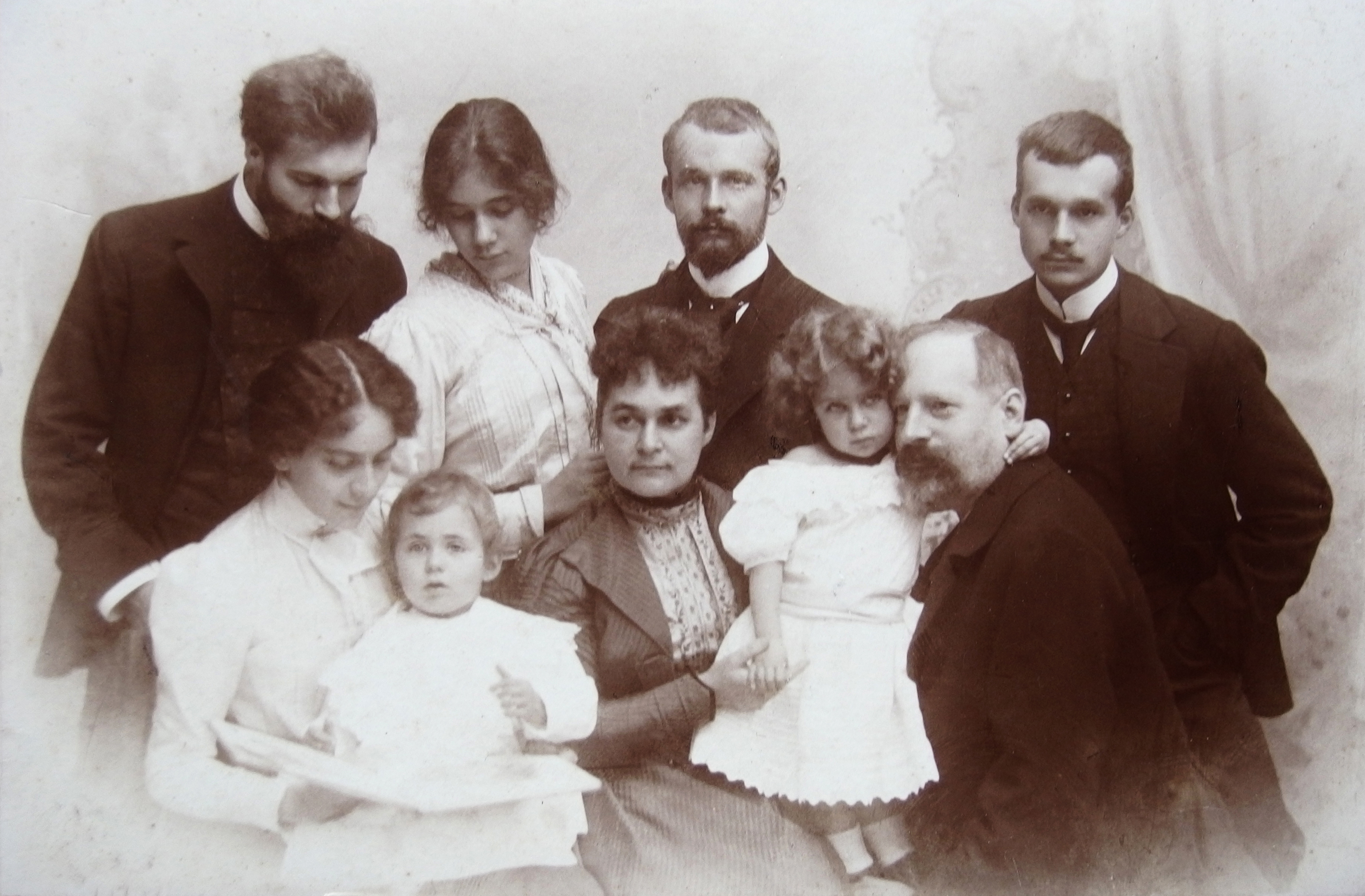
Sohn-Rethel family photo (c. 1900)

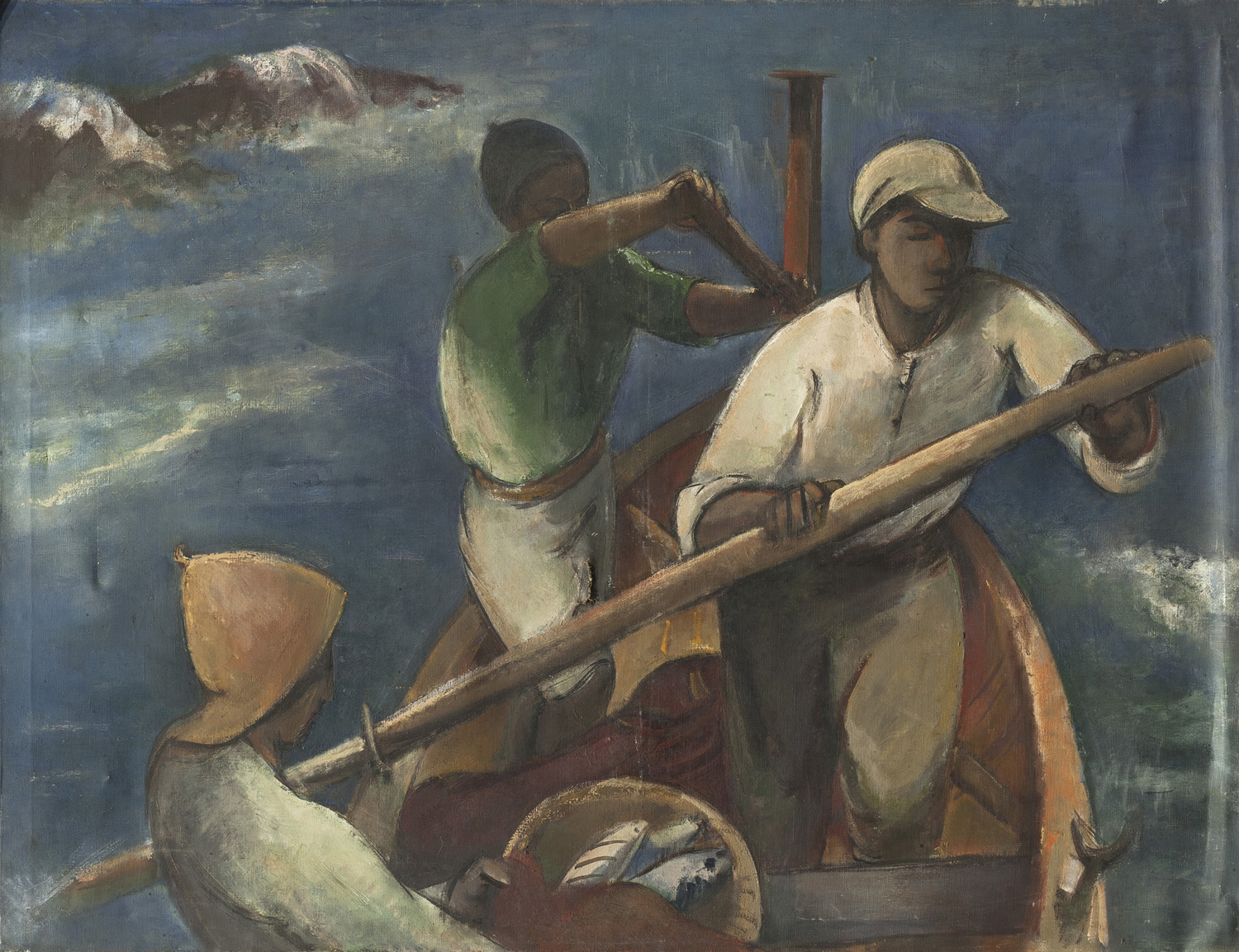
Karli Sohn-Rethel, Fisherman with a Boat, (c. 1935), oil painting

Carl Ernst "Karli" Sohn-Rethel (1882–1966) German Modernist painter of the Düsseldorf school of painting art movement. He traveled often and was active in Düsseldorf, Munich, Rome, Positano, Paris, among other places. Sohn-Rethel was a member of the art groups, Sonderbund group and Young Rhineland.

== Biography ==
=== Early life ===
Sohn-Rethel was born 8 May 1882, as the third child of the portrait painter Karl Rudolf Sohn and his wife, the artist Else Sohn-Rethel. His mother was the daughter of the painter Alfred Rethel. His father was the son of Karl Ferdinand Sohn. His older brothers were the painters Alfred Sohn-Rethel, the father of the philosopher Alfred Sohn-Rethel, and Otto Sohn-Rethel. His younger sister Mira was married to the painter Werner Heuser.

He studied at Kunstakademie Düsseldorf (Düsseldorf Art Academy) where he graduated in 1903, and that same year in spring he continued his studies at Dresden Academy of Fine Arts. At Dresden he studied under Carl Bantzer, and Gotthardt Kuehl.

=== Career and later life ===
After he completed his training, he traveled to Rome to meet up with his brother Otto, his brother-in-law Werner Heuser, and artists Karl Hofer, Hermann Haller and Maurice Sterne. Sohn-Rethel was in Rome from 1906 until 1912. In 1911, Karli Sohn-Rethel joined the Sonderbund group with other Düsseldorf painters. These painters included Julius Bretz, Max Clarenbach, August Deusser, Walter Ophey, Wilhelm Schmurr, and his brothers Otto Sohn-Rethel and Alfred Sohn-Rethel. From this experience, he joined Alfred Flechtheim's gallery.

From October 1912 to May 1914, Sohn-Rethel traveled and painted with his friend Maurice Sterne, they visited Tunis, Tunisia; Varanasi, India; Mandalay, Burma; Java, Indonesia; and Bali. He returned to Europe and it was the beginning of World War I, and he stayed in Munich. In 1919 he joined the art Young Rhineland art group. He took part in the opening of the Galerie Alfred Flechtheim that same year, in 1919.

After the end of World War I, he moved in 1920–1921 to Positano, Italy and socialized with Walter Benjamin, Siegfried Kracauer, Ernst Bloch, and Alfred Kantorowicz. Sohn-Rethel emigrated to Italy during the Nazi occupation of Germany, around 1933. He stayed with his painter friend Kurt Craemer in Positano, Italy, a city he had visited earlier in 1920.

=== Death and legacy ===
In 1959, Sohn-Rethel moved back to Düsseldorf, Germany, where he died on 7 April 1966. He is buried at Nordfriedhof Düsseldorf cemetery.

WWII would destroy much of his works although some of his works survived. These surviving paintings are held at the Suermondt-Ludwig and the Wallraf-Richartz Museum. His work is in various public museum collections including Provincial Art Gallery of Salerno, among others.

== Work ==
Sohn-Rethel's early works were inspired by the works of artists Cézanne and Matisse. Later in life he created his own expressionist style. His style of painting was influenced by the abstract human figure in his landscape studies. He often rendered people's faces as abstract ovals. During his time living in Positano, he often depicted fishermen on the beach and groups of locals in his paintings.
