= Otto Sohn-Rethel =

German lepidopterist and painter (1877–1949)

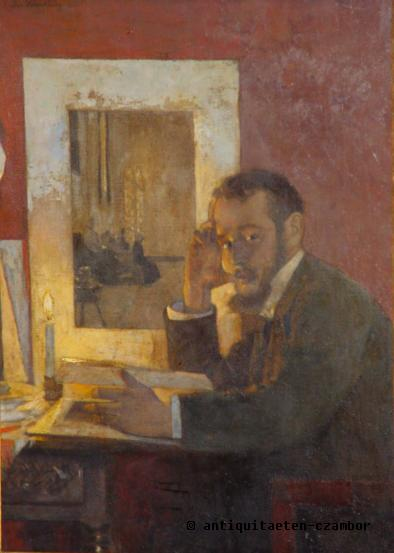
- Otto Sohn-Rethel, by Gustav Wendling (c.1900)
- Born: 18 January 1877; Düsseldorf, German Empire
- Died: 7 June 1949 (aged 72); Anacapri, Italy
- Education: Kunstakademie Düsseldorf
- Occupation: Painter
- Parents: Karl Rudolf Sohn (father); Else Sohn-Rethel (mother)
- Relatives: Alfred Sohn-Rethel (sibling), Karli Sohn-Rethel (sibling), Werner Heuser (brother in-law)

Otto Wilhelm Sohn-Rethel (1877–1949) German lepidopterist and a painter of the Düsseldorf school of painting art movement. Sohn-Rethel was a member of the art groups, Sonderbund group and Young Rhineland. The prominent theme of his art was young men frequently in the nude.

== Life and work ==
Otto Wilhelm Sohn-Rethel was born on 18 January 1877 in Düsseldorf, Germany. He was the second son of the artists Karl Rudolf Sohn and Else Sohn-Rethel. He was given the name "Otto Wilhelm" after his great uncles, the painters Otto Rethel and Wilhelm Sohn. In the summer of 1883, Sohn-Rethel's interest in butterflies began in-part because of his uncle, Erich Hettner (1868–1933).

Starting in 1890, he studied at Kunstakademie Düsseldorf (Düsseldorf Art Academy) under artists Heinrich Lauenstein, Hugo Crola, and Adolf Schill. Followed by study at Académie Julian in Paris. He was a member of the Deutscher Künstlerbund (Association of German Artists).

Besides painting, he was a lepidopterist and studied and collected butterfly and moth species between 1902 and 1912. One of which was the moth subspecies named after him, Chortodes morrisii sohnretheli.

In 1902, Sohn-Rethel started his travels in Rome, followed by Frascati, and finally in 1904 to Anacapri a city on the island of Capri. His wealth allowed him to live in Capri, a place that was known as a gay community at the time. He painted portraits and figure studies, many of nude men once here. One of his students during this period was the young Italian artist, Giovanni Tessitore. He maintained a studio in Rome. In the winter of 1903–1904 he sublet his Rome studio Villa Strohl-Fern to Rainer Maria Rilke. In 1906, he met up in Rome with his brother Karli, his brother-in-law Werner Heuser, and artists Karl Hofer, Hermann Haller and Maurice Sterne.

In 1909, Otto Sohn-Rethel joined the Sonderbund group with other Düsseldorf painters, which included Julius Bretz, Max Clarenbach, August Deusser, Walter Ophey, Wilhelm Schmurr, and his brothers Karli Sohn-Rethel and Alfred Sohn-Rethel. In 1919, Sohn-Rethel joined the art group, Young Rhineland.

During World War I, Sohn-Rethel served in the war and was stationed in Düsseldorf. During this time he painted the wounded soldiers and would provide precise descriptions and images. After the war he settled in Anacapri, Italy, and lived at Villa Lina. Villa Lina became a meeting place for the expatriate community including his nephew Alfred Sohn-Rethel, writer Norman Douglas, among others. In 1943, wartime differences between Italy and Germany led him to hand out the house to a former Italian servant in order to avoid the house from being taken away. At the end of the war, the house and all the paintings that it held were however not returned and Sohn-Rethel was forced to live with his friend and neighbour Hans Berg.

He died on 7 June 1949 in Anacapri, Italy, where he is buried.

== Selected works ==
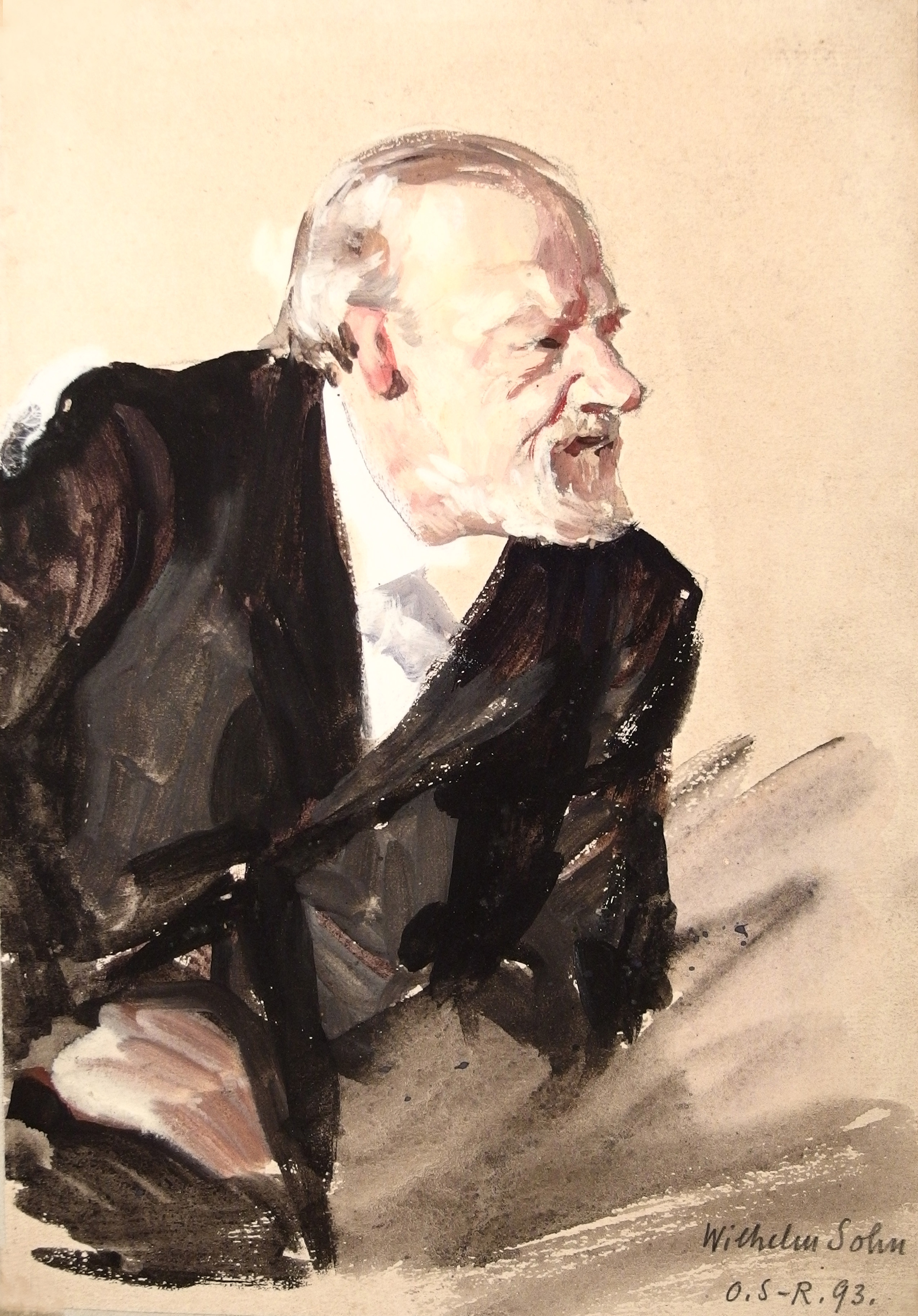
Portrait of Wilhelm Sohn, (1893)

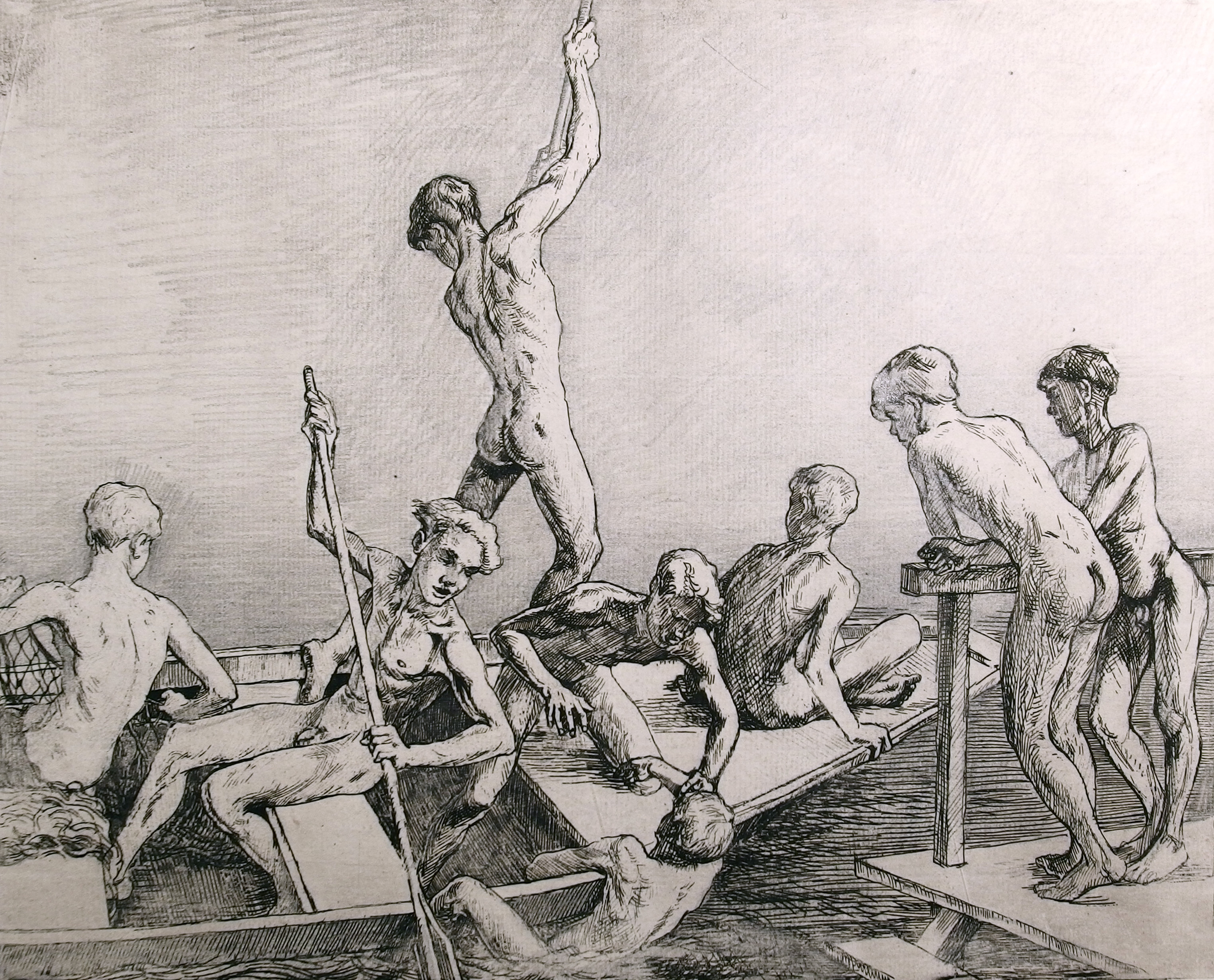
Nude Boys with a Boat at Anacapri, (1934)

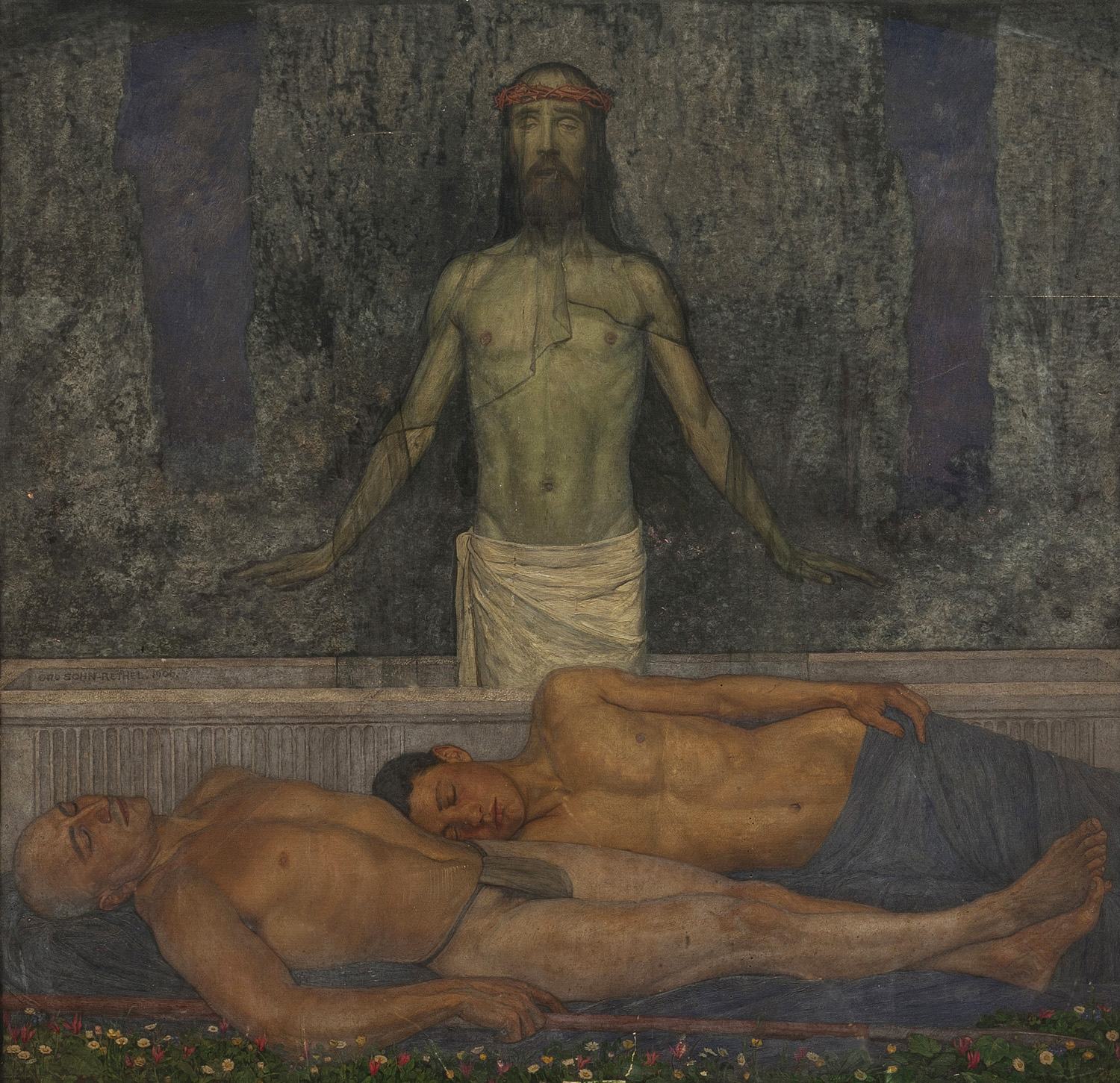
Resurrection, (1905),
paper on wood

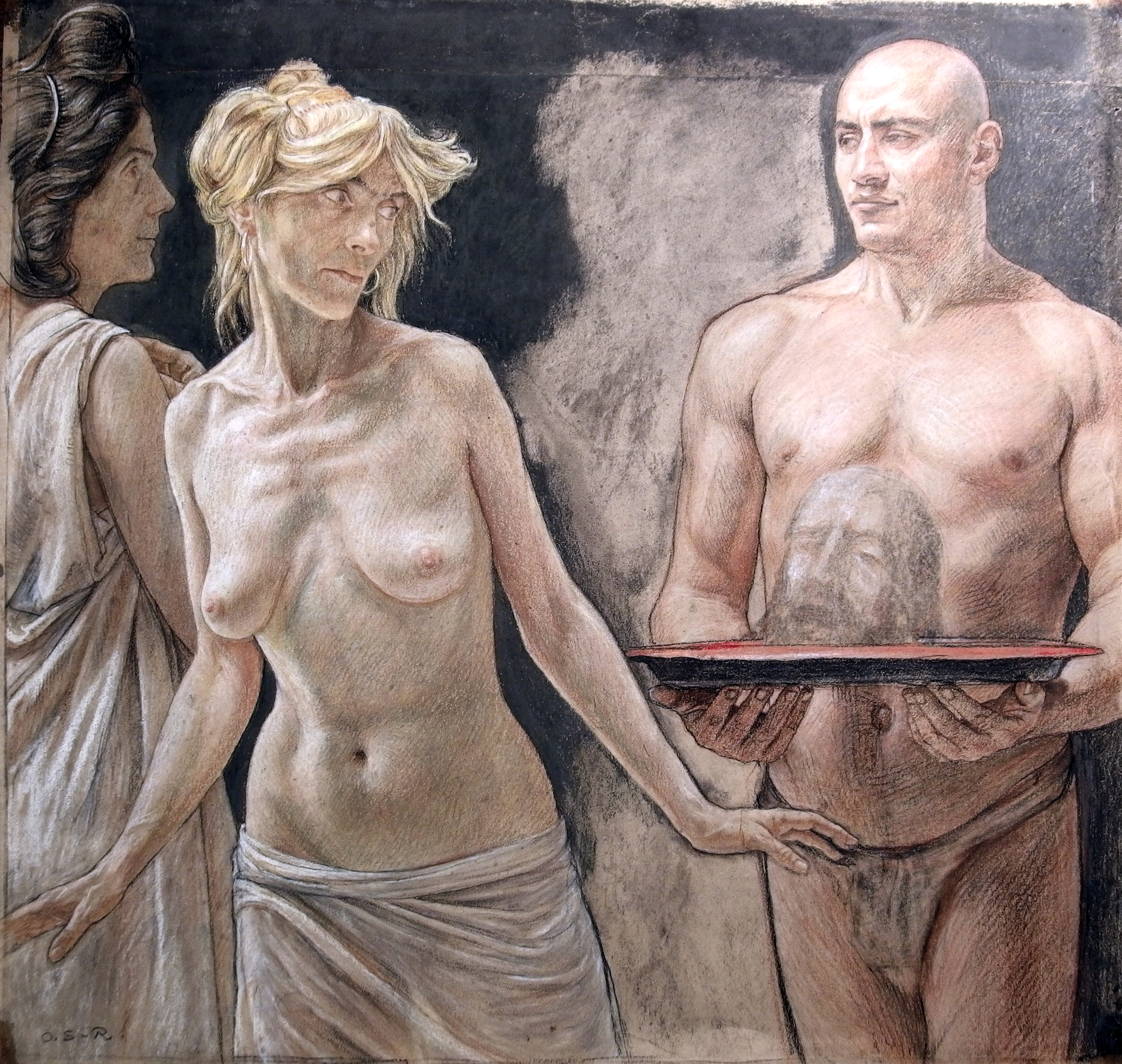
The Head of Johannes, (c. 1907), colored pencil drawing
