= Richard Sohn =

German painter (1834–1912)

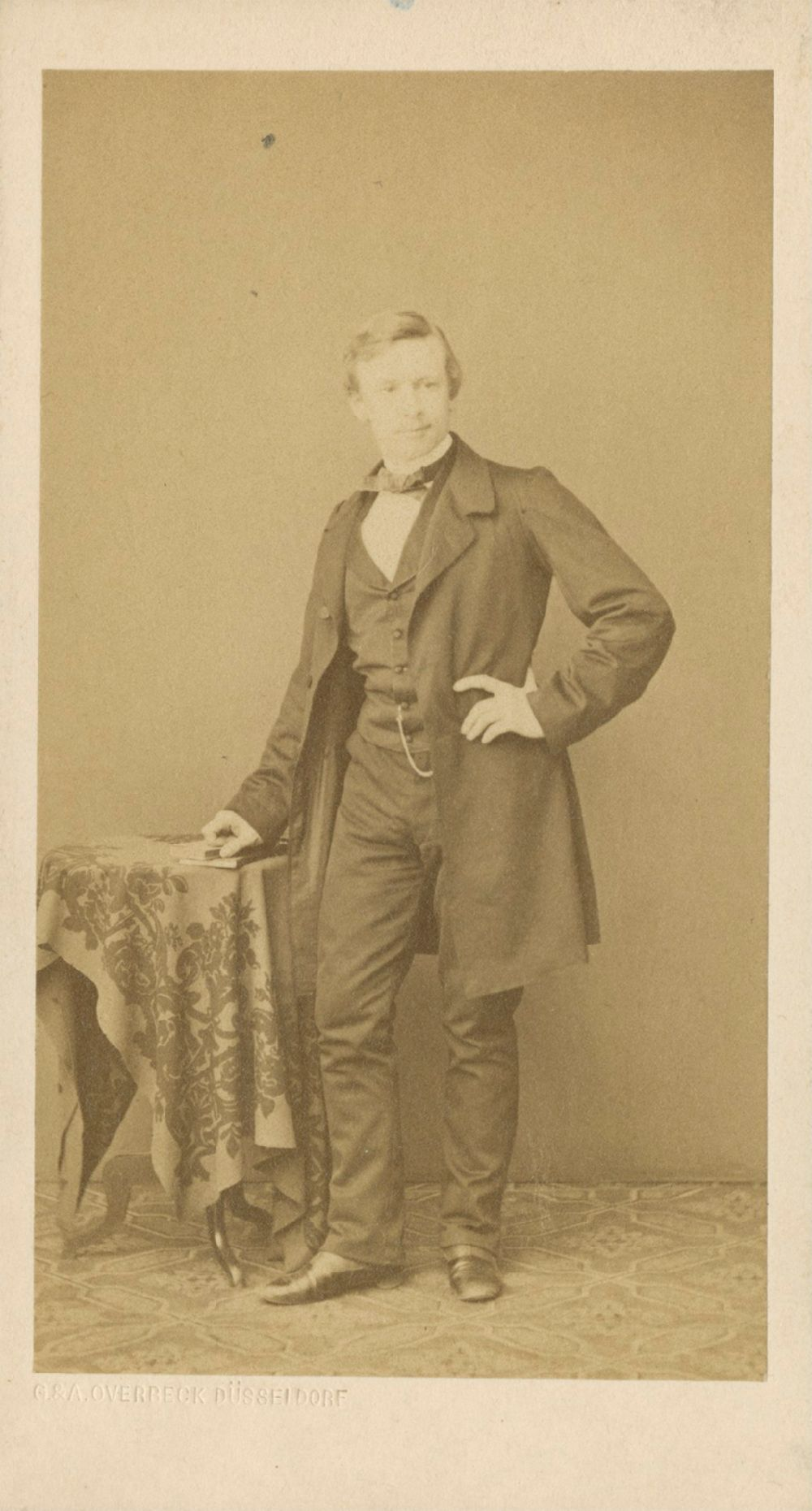
Richard Sohn by G. & A. Overbeck (firm), c. 1868

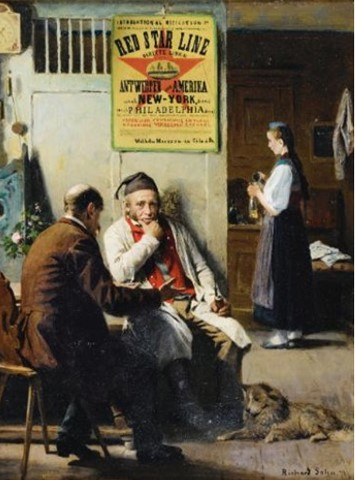
The Future Emigrant to New York (1876)

Paul Eduard Richard Sohn (11 November 1834 – 9 March 1912) was a German genre painter. His younger brother, Karl Rudolf, was also a well known painter.

== Biography ==
He was born in Düsseldorf to the artist, Karl Ferdinand Sohn, and his wife Emilie Auguste née Von Mülmann (1805–1884); a sister of the government councillor, Otto von Mülmann. In 1851, he completed his public school education at the "Städtischen Realschule" (now the "Humboldt-Gymnasium Düsseldorf").

His first artistic studies were with his father. He then enrolled at the Kunstakademie Düsseldorf, where he studied with Rudolf Wiegmann, Heinrich Mücke, and Karl Josef Ignatz Mosler. After 1855, he attended the master classes taught by Friedrich Wilhelm Schadow. From 1860 to 1862, he took private lessons from Rudolf Jordan, who was married to his mother's youngest sister, Sophie.

In 1867, he made a study trip to Paris. He was also influenced by the work of his cousin, Wilhelm Sohn, although he remained generally true to the styles of the Düsseldorf school of painting. His works sold very well in the United States. Beginning in the 1870s, he also painted the occasional portrait; including one of Kaiser Wilhelm I. He was also a member of the progressive artists' group, Malkasten, and served as their librarian.

Described by his sister-in-law, Else Sohn-Rethel, as "quiet and inconspicuous", he never married and, after 1870, lived with his mother. Following her death in 1884, he moved to a modest home of his own and opened a studio nearby. He died in 1912 in Düsseldorf.
