= Sonderbund westdeutscher Kunstfreunde und Künstler =

German arts group (1909–1916)

The "Sonderbund" — as it is normally called; its complete name being Sonderbund westdeutscher Kunstfreunde und Künstler (the "Separate League of West German Art Lovers and Artists"), and also known as Sonderbund group — was a "special union" of artists and art lovers, established 1909 in Düsseldorf and dissolved in 1916. In its first years, the Sonderbund mounted some landmark exhibitions, successfully introducing French Impressionist, Post-Impressionist and Modern Art to the western parts of Germany.

== History ==
The international movement of Secessionism, which since 1890 began to cover the European art scene, entered Düsseldorf, its renowned art school and artist societies at a very late date. In 1908, a group of younger artists first organized a "special exhibition" ("Sonderausstellung"), the year following they reunited in a "Sonderbund" exhibition works of their own with French contemporary art lent by local collectors and the Galerie Bernheim-Jeune of Paris. Encouraged by museum professionals, in August 1909 the Sonderbund was officially established.

The lasting fame of the "Sonderbund" is founded on its three "International Art Exhibitions", 1910 and 1911 in Düsseldorf, and, especially, the 1912 Sonderbund exhibition in Cologne, which supplied a breathtaking review of early modern art with numerous iconic works from artists including Vincent van Gogh, Paul Cézanne, Paul Gauguin, Pablo Picasso and the neo-impressionists Henri-Edmond Cross and Paul Signac. There was a special focus on Edvard Munch.

The Board of Directors of the Sonderbund included many luminaries from the world of modern art, such as Josef Feinhals, Herbert Eulenberg, Alfred Flechtheim, Karl Ernst Osthaus, Richard Reich, Max Creutz, Max Clarenbach, and Walter Cohen.

== Legacy and impact ==
The organizers of the 1913 Armory Show were highly impressed by the exhibition in Cologne, and thus first rate European art soon made its way to the United States.

The 1912 Sonderbund is considered a precursor to the Documenta exhibitions.

In 2012, the Sonderbund of 1912 was reconstructed in an exhibition "1912 - Mission Moderne" at Wallraf Richartz Museum in Cologne. (31 August to 30 December)

== Artists related to Sonderbund ==
- Julius Bretz
- Max Clarenbach
- August Deusser
- Walter Ophey
- Ernst Osthaus
- Egon Schiele
- Wilhelm Schmurr
- Alfred Sohn-Rethel
- Karli Sohn-Rethel
- Otto Sohn-Rethel

== See also ==
- List of German painters
- Alfred Flechtheim
- Max Meirowsky
- Carl Sternheim
