= Alfred Sohn-Rethel =

Marxist economist and philosopher (1899–1990)

Alfred Sohn-Rethel (German: [ˈzoːn ˈʁeːtl̩]; 4 January 1899 – 6 April 1990) was a French-born German Marxian economist and philosopher especially interested in epistemology. His main intellectual achievement was the publication of Intellectual and Manual Labour: A Critique of Epistemology. He also wrote about the relationship between German industry and National Socialism.

== Biography ==
Born in Neuilly-sur-Seine near Paris, Sohn-Rethel came from a family of painters, his father was painter, Alfred Sohn-Rethel (1875–1958) and his mother was Anna Julie, née Michels. His mother was a descendant from the noble Oppenheim family and had influential relations with big business. His paternal grandfather was painter, Karl Rudolf Sohn and his paternal grandmother was painter and singer, Else Sohn-Rethel. As his family did not want him also to become a painter, he was brought up by his uncle, the steel industrialist Ernst Poensgen. On Christmas 1915, he expressed a wish for a copy of Karl Marx's Capital as a present. He received one and studied it intensively. Thrown out of home, he participated in the anti-war student protest in his first year at Heidelberg University in 1917. He opposed the Spartacist uprising on the grounds that it prevented a more promising later revolution.

From 1920 Sohn-Rethel was a friend of the philosopher Ernst Bloch, and he met Walter Benjamin in 1921. He came to live in Positano in 1923–24, and Naples: philosophy of the broken recorded his fascination with the relaxed Neapolitan attitude to technology. Between 1924 and 1927 he remained in Italy, "mainly in Capri, where Benjamin and Bloch were staying", meeting Adorno and Kracauer also at Capri in 1924. Additionally his paternal uncle, Otto Sohn-Rethel lived in Anacapri, a city in Capri, whom he visited with. He stayed in contact with different members of the Frankfurt School, to whom his theoretical concerns were close; however, they never established a close working relationship.

Sohn-Rethel received his doctorate with the Austrian economist Emil Lederer in 1928. In his thesis he criticized the theory of marginal utility as a petitio principii because it implies the notion of number implicitly. Thanks to Poensgen he found a job as research assistant at the Mitteleuropäischer Wirtschaftstag (MWT). The MWT was a lobbying organization of the leading export industries. From 1931 to 1936 he worked 'in the cave of the lion' and watched and analyzed power politics from a very close distance. At the same time he had contacts with socialist resistance groups like Neu Beginnen or Roter Stoßtrupp.

Due to his classification as "mixed-race" under the 1935 Nuremberg Laws, he emigrated in 1936 to Switzerland, from where he unsuccessfully applied for a lectureship at the New York-based University of Frankfurt Institute for Social Research, encountering the veto of Max Horkheimer despite the support of Theodor W. Adorno. He then moved via Paris to England, where he participated in a research group on ancient Greece in Oxford with the numismatist George Derwent Thomson (leading to the idea that abstract thought originated with the first monetary transactions) and wrote economic analyses for a circle close to Winston Churchill that were used against Neville Chamberlain's appeasement policy.

For a long time after the Second World War Sohn-Rethel was not able to continue his theoretical work. From 1951 he worked as a teacher of French. He joined the Communist Party and despite his disillusionment he was a member until 1972. The 1968 movement created a new interest in his work. At the funeral of Adorno in Frankfurt in 1969, he met Suhrkamp Verlag's editor-in-chief Siegfried Unseld who encouraged him to crystallize his ideas, leading to the publication of Sohn-Rethel's principal work Intellectual and Manual Labor.

In 1978, Sohn-Rethel was appointed Professor for Social Philosophy at Bremen University. He died in Bremen in 1990.

== Work ==
Sohn-Rethel's lifelong project was the critique of Kantian epistemology through Marx's critique of political economy. Even though individuals exchange commodities in order to gain access to their use-value, the act of exchange is possible only through the abstraction from the use-value that permits to draw an equivalence of value between disparate sensible objects. Only the value of these goods is important. This abstraction is called 'real abstraction' because it is not operated by the consciousness of the property owners, but is nevertheless necessarily presupposed by the real act of exchange. Sohn-Rethel believed this abstraction to be the real basis of formal and abstract thinking. All of Kant's categories such as space, time, quality, substance, accident, movement and so forth are present in the act of exchange. Readers of Marx will not be entirely surprised by such a genealogy, since Marx himself suggested that the ideas of freedom and equality, at least as we know them so far, are rooted in the exchange of commodities. Sohn-Rethel's work on the nature of 'real abstraction' has been amplified and extended by the writers of Arena (Australian publishing co-operative), especially the notion that a post-Marxist social and historical analysis can be founded on the 'real abstraction' principle. An example of using Sohn-Rethel's idea of commodity occurs in Slavoj Žižek's work The Sublime Object of Ideology.

The second domain where Sohn-Rethel made important contributions was the study of the economic policies that favoured the rise of German fascism, much of which is based on first-hand knowledge gained from his time at the MWT. He insisted on the difference between different factions of capitalists, the more prospering industries close to Brüning and the less successful industries close to the Harzburger Front (Hugenberg, Hitler) namely coal, construction and steel - with the exception of Krupp. The endorsement of the compromise between industry and big agrarians at the shareholders' meeting of the IG Farben in 1932 paved the way for the dictatorship, according to Sohn-Rethel.

== Publications ==
- Von der Analytik des Wirtschaftens zur Theorie der Volkswirtschaft. Methodologische Untersuchung mit besonderem Bezug auf die Theorie Schumpeters, Emsdetten: H. & J. Lechte, 1936
- Geistige und körperliche Arbeit. Zur Theorie der gesellschaftlichen Synthesis, Frankfurt: Suhrkamp, 1970; 2nd edn. 1972; 3rd edn. as Geistige und körperliche Arbeit. Zur Epistemologie der abendländischen Geschichte, Weinheim: VCH Acta Humaniora, 1989
  - English trans. of the 2nd edn. as Intellectual and Manual Labour: A Critique of Epistemology, Atlantic Highlands, NJ: Humanities Press, 1977; reprinted with new introduction, afterword, and responses, Leiden: Brill, 2021
- Ökonomie und Klassenstruktur des deutschen Faschismus. Aufzeichnungen und Analysen, Frankfurt: Suhrkamp, 1973
  - English trans. by Martin Sohn-Rethel as Economy and Class Structure of German Fascism, London: CSE Books, 1978; 2nd edn., London: Free Association Books, 1987
