= Karl Rudolf Sohn =

German portrait painter (1845–1908)

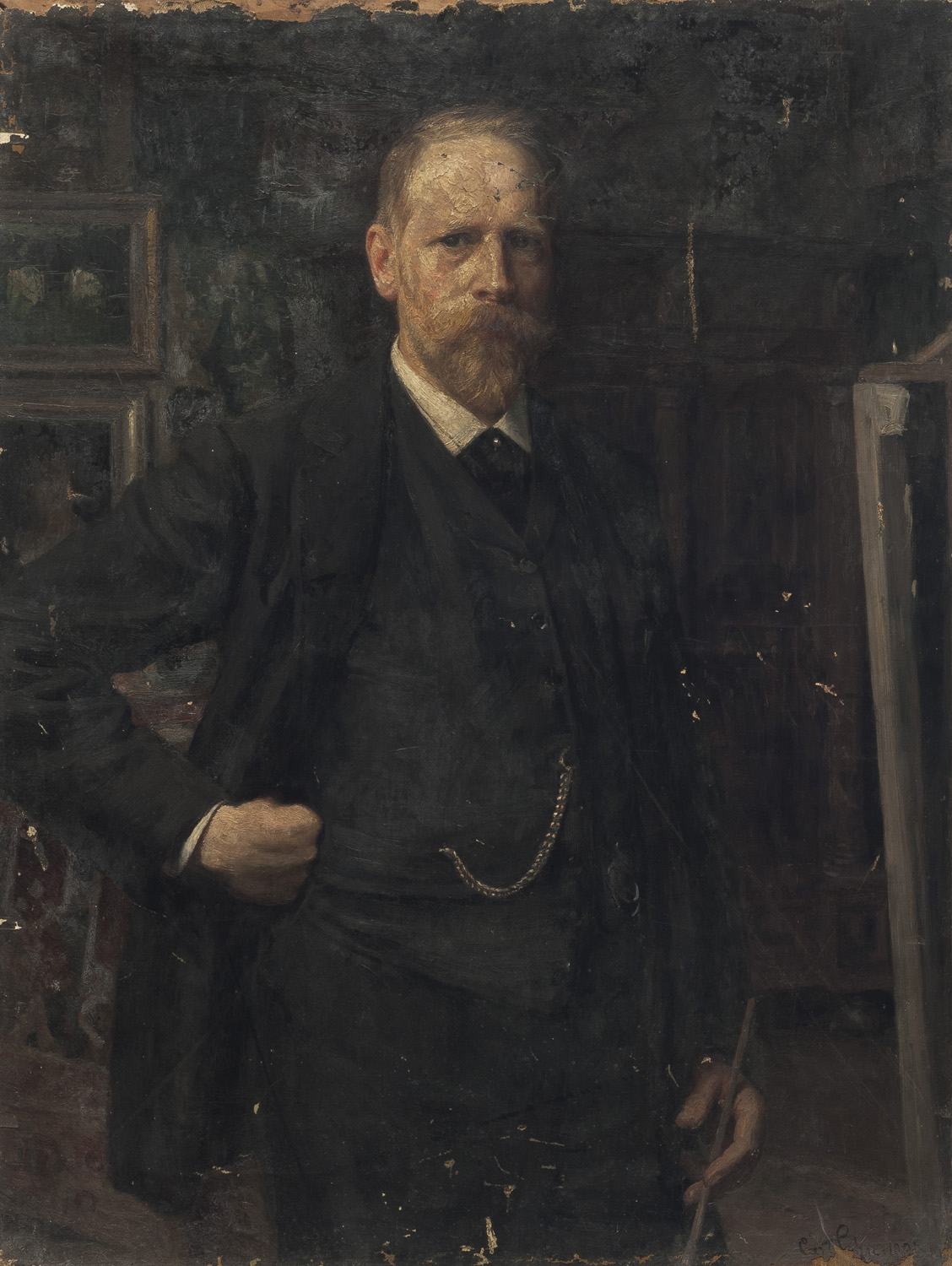
- Self-portrait (1894)
- Born: 21 July 1845; Düsseldorf, German Confederation
- Died: 29 August 1908; Düsseldorf, German Empire
- Other names: Carl Rudolf Sohn
- Spouse: Else Sohn-Rethel
- Children: 4

Karl Friedrich Rudolf Sohn (21 July 1845, Düsseldorf – 29 August 1908, Düsseldorf) was a German portrait painter in the Academic style.

== Biography ==
His father was the landscape painter, Karl Ferdinand Sohn. After graduating from the Königliches Gymnasium, he was drafted for military service, but was rejected for "physical weaknesses". In 1863, he began studying engineering at the Polytechnic School in Karlsruhe. He completed his studies in 1866, but never practiced as an engineer. He returned to Düsseldorf and, shortly before his father's death, he began to study art with him.

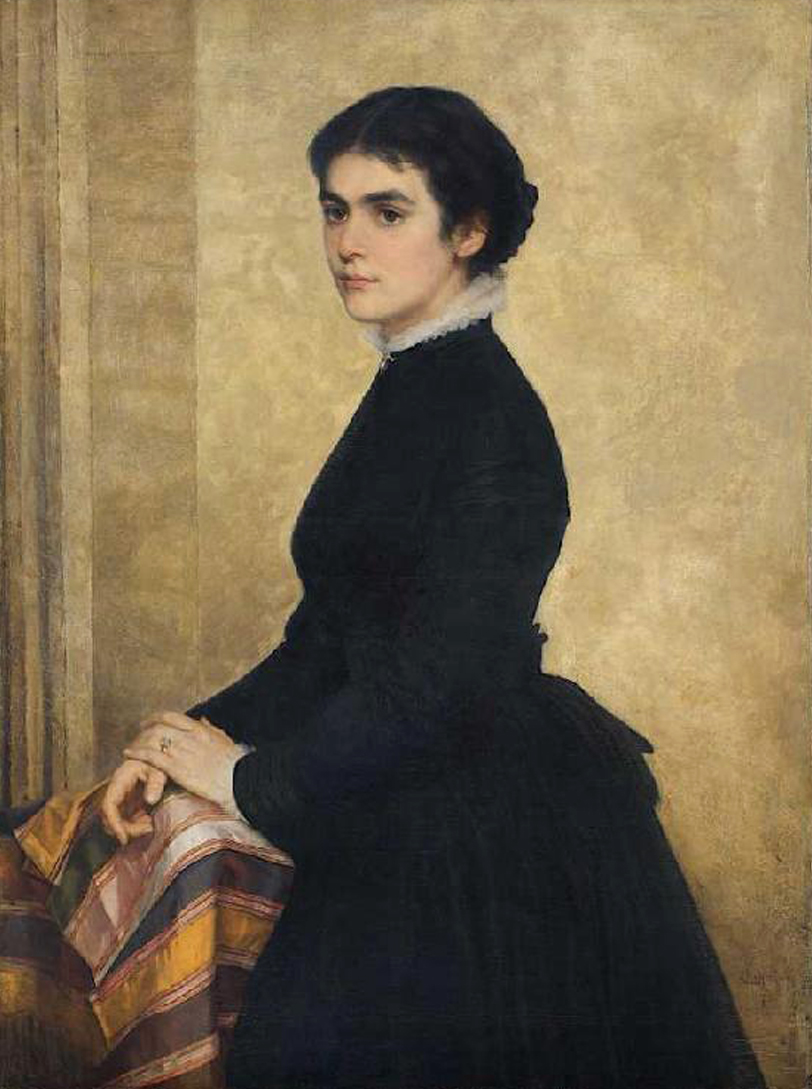
Portrait of his wife, Else Sohn-Rethel (1873)

From 1867 to 1870, he was a student at the Kunstakademie Düsseldorf, where he studied history painting with Karl Müller and figure painting with Julius Roeting. After the outbreak of the Franco-Prussian War, he volunteered for a Hussar regiment, but was placed on reserve. It was then he began private studies with his cousin, Wilhelm Sohn, which eventually determined his choice to be a portrait painter.

In 1873, he married Else Sohn-Rethel in Dresden, the daughter of the painter Alfred Rethel. She would later become a well-known artist in her own right, as well as a popular singer. After the honeymoon, he established a permanent studio in Düsseldorf. He exhibited locally and sold his works in Paris through Goupil & Cie. The following year, he became a lecturer at the Kunstakademie. Within a few years, he was able to afford a larger home and studio.

His reputation as a portrait painter spread internationally. From 1882 to 1886, he was summoned to England by Queen Victoria, where he painted her portrait as well as those of Prince Leopold, Princess Beatrice, John Brown (the Queen's servant), and others. She sat only once, to have him sketch her face, then other court ladies sat for him to fill in the details of clothing.

In 1888, he was appointed a juror for the Third International Art Exposition at the Glaspalast in Munich; together with his friends Robert Diez, Fritz Schaper and others. He travelled throughout Italy and France and became an early member of the Deutscher Künstlerbund (Association of German Artists), participating in their exhibition of 1906.

A year after his death, the city of Düsseldorf hosted a memorial exhibition.

=== Personal life ===
His sons, Alfred Sohn-Rethel, Otto Sohn-Rethel and Karli Sohn-Rethel all became well-known painters, and his daughter Mira Sohn-Rethel Heuser married painter Werner Heuser. His brother, Richard Sohn, was also an artist of some note.

== Other portraits ==
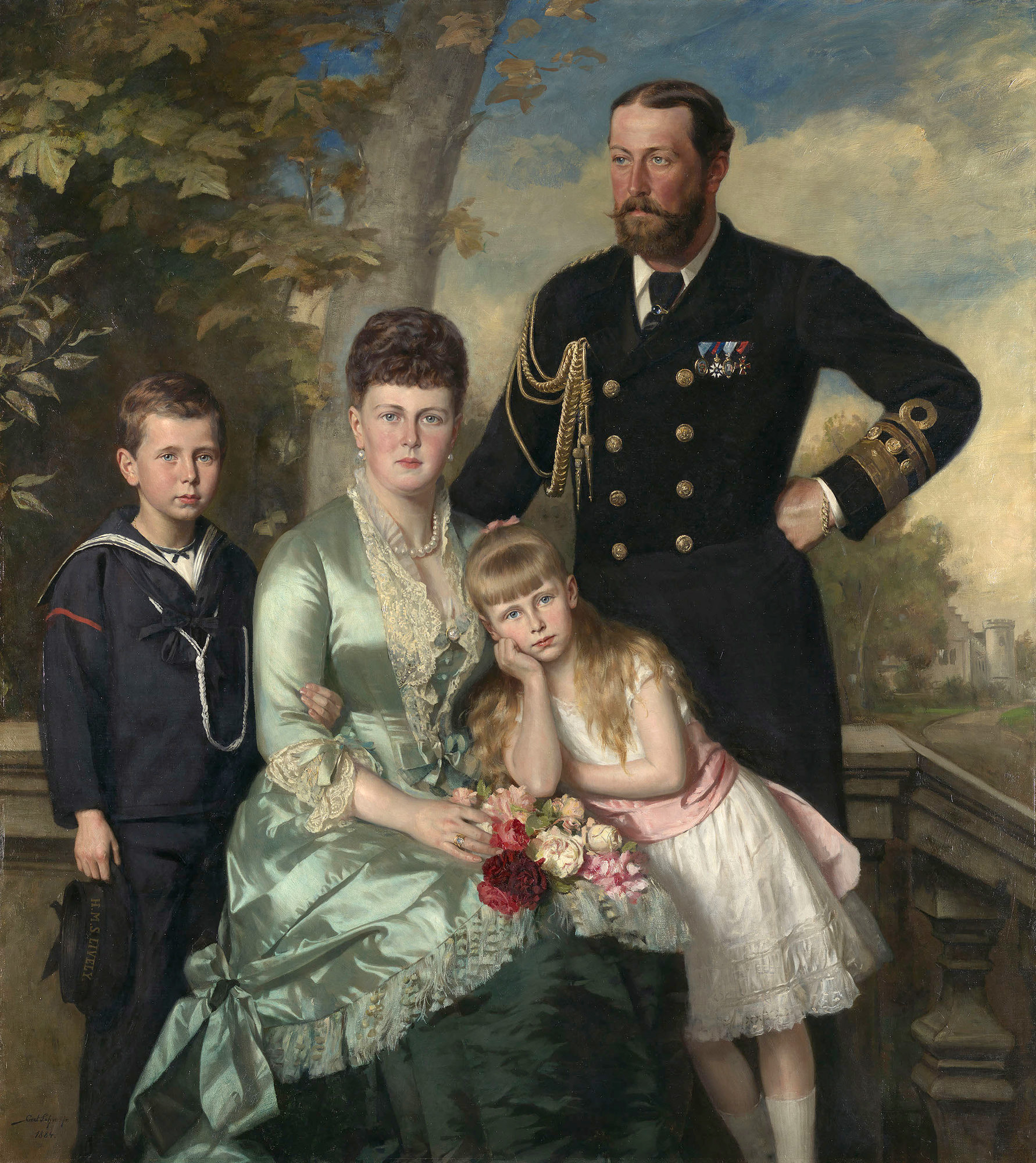
Alfred, Duke of Edinburgh
and Family

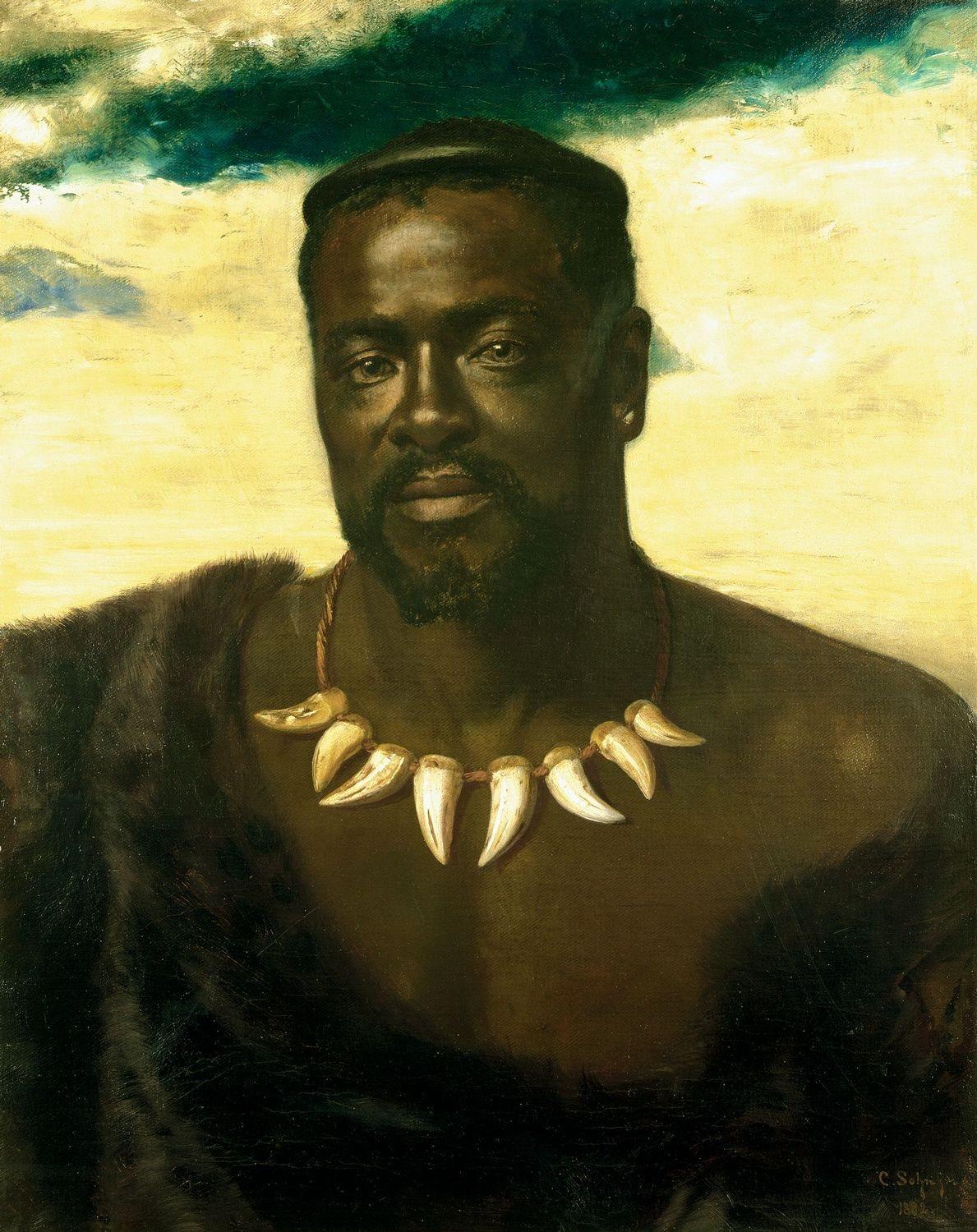
Cetshwayo, King of the Zulus

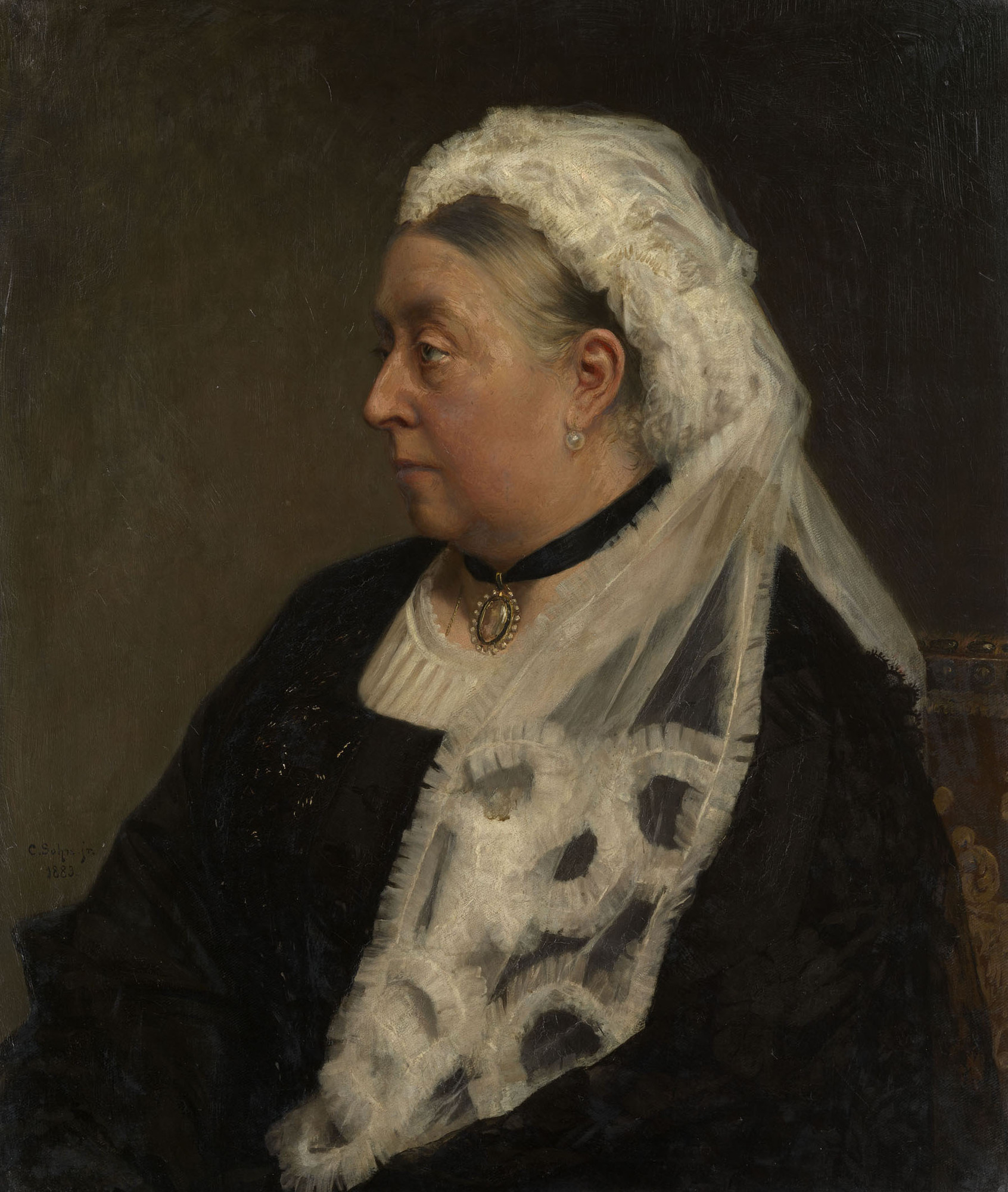
Queen Victoria

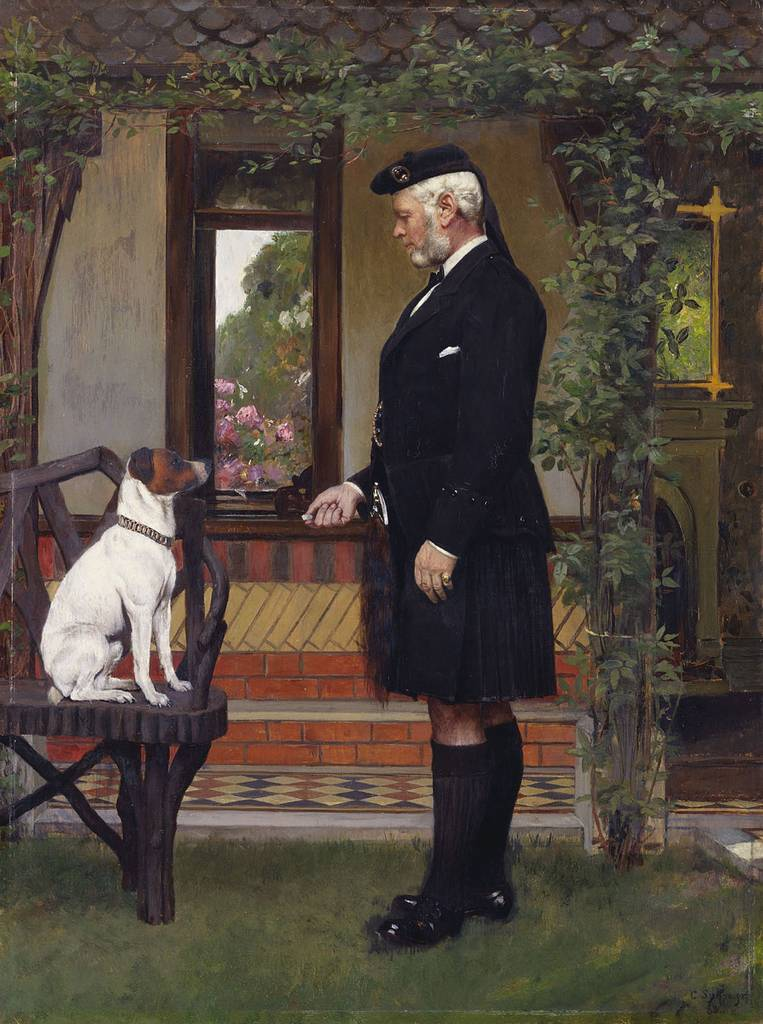
John Brown at Frogmore

== Sources ==
- "Sohn, Carl Rudolph" in: Thieme-Becker: Allgemeines Lexikon der Bildenden Künstler von der Antike bis zur Gegenwart. Vol. 38 (Sim-Sta) together with Hans Vollmer(Ed.): Allgemeines Lexikon der bildenden Künstler des XX. Jahrhunderts. E. A. Seemann (CD-ROM), Leipzig 2008. ISBN 978-3-86502-177-9
