= Karl Ferdinand Sohn =

German painter (1805–1867)

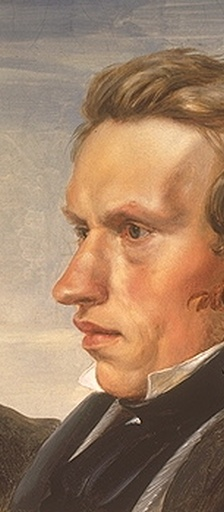
Karl Ferdinand Sohn, from a group portrait by Julius Hübner

Karl Ferdinand Sohn (10 December 1805 – 25 November 1867) was a German painter of the Düsseldorf school of painting.

== Biography ==
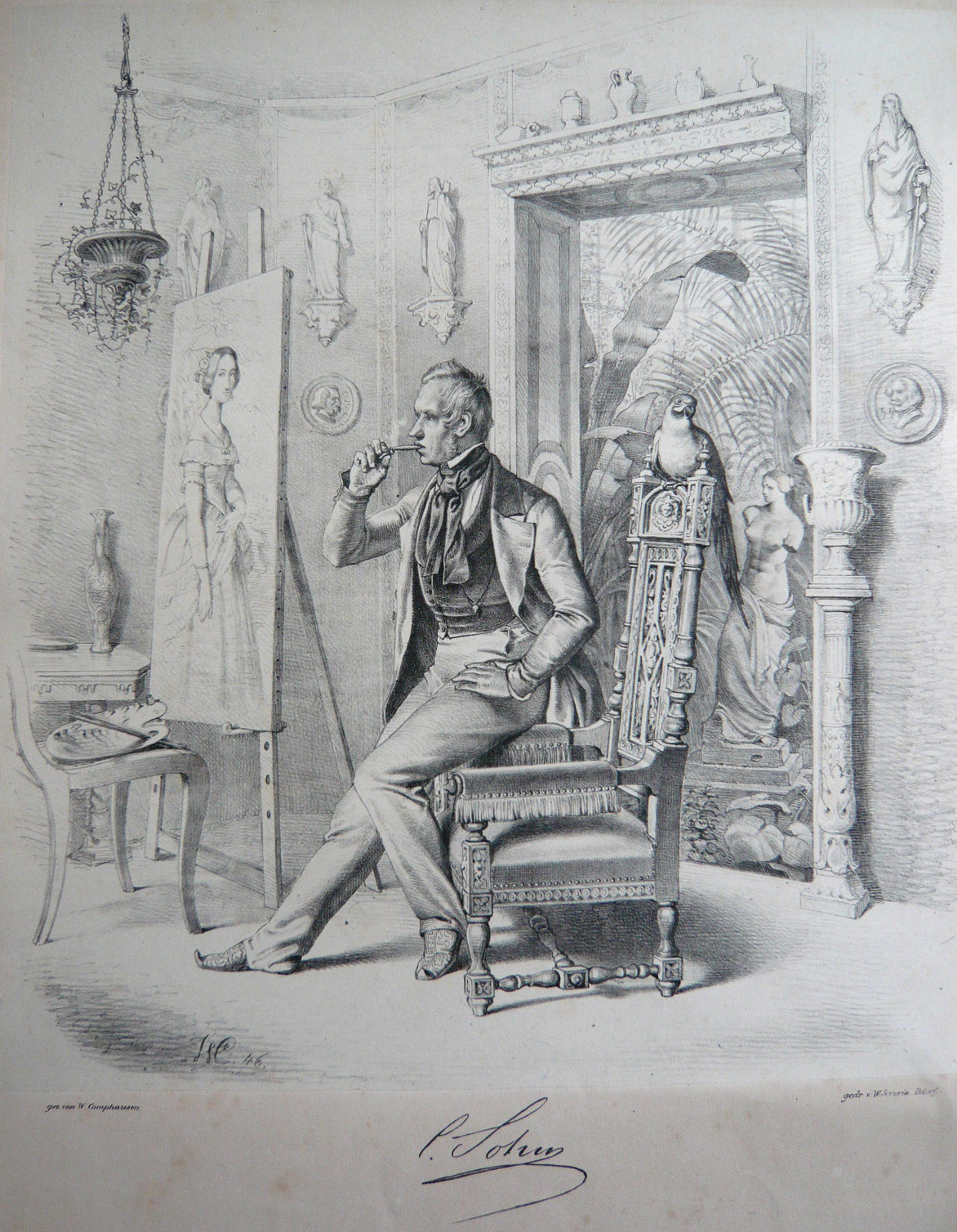
Sohn in his studio, 1846

He was born in Berlin and started his studies at the age of eighteen under Wilhelm von Schadow, whom he followed to Düsseldorf. He focused on mythical and poetic subjects of a highly romantic character, and painted in the idealistic manner of the Düsseldorf school.

He visited Italy (1830–1831) and adopted ideas from the works of the Venetians; Titian, Paolo Veronese, and Palma il Vecchio. In 1832, he was named a Professor at the Düsseldorf Academy, where he exercised an important influence.

On 18 January 1834, he married Emilie Auguste von Mülmann in Düsseldorf. They had five children. His two sons Paul Eduard Richard Sohn (1834–1912) and Karl Friedrich Rudolf Sohn (1845–1908) also grew up to be painters. The latter married Else Sohn-Rethel (1853–1933), daughter of the painter Alfred Rethel. Clara, his eldest daughter, was married to the German composer and conductor Albert Dietrich. His daughter Marie married the painter Karl Hoff (1838–1890). His youngest daughter, Emilie, married his nephew, the painter Wilhelm Sohn (1830–1899), thereby making him his nephew and son-in-law.

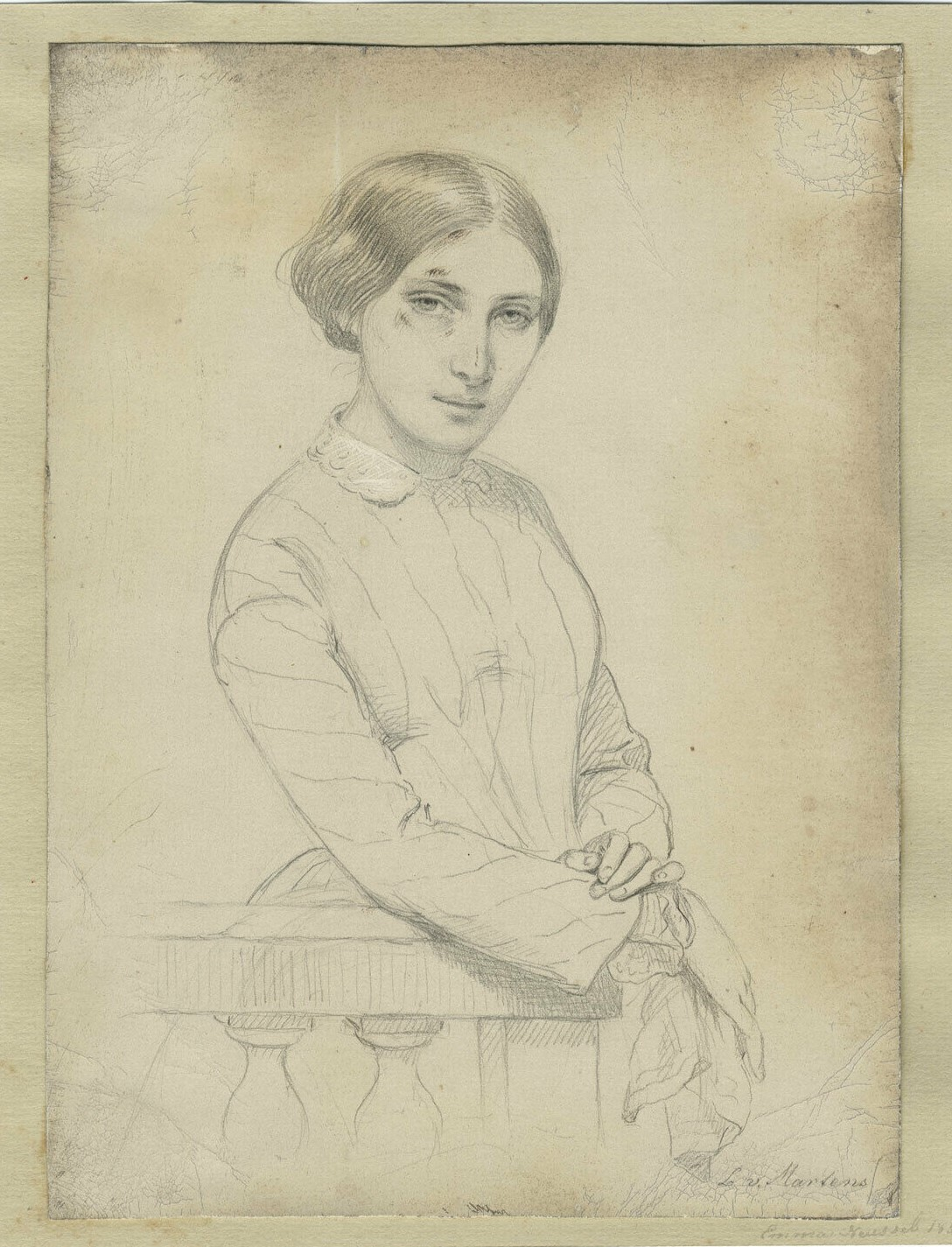
Karl Ferdinand Sohn trained many female painters. His pupils included the painters Luise von Martens and Emma Elwin (née Neussel). The present portrait of Emma Elwin was done by Martens when both were in their mid-twenties. It is probably the only surviving portrait of Emma Elwin (private collection Germany).

Later, He painted biblical subjects, and then devoted himself to genre scenes, well characterized and of great coloristic charm. Among these are: the Consultation at the Lawyer's (1866, Leipzig Museum) and the Warrior of the Seventeenth Century (1869, Dresden Gallery).

At the age of nearly sixty-two Karl Ferdinand Sohn died on 25 November 1867 during a visit to his friend Ferdinand Hiller in Cologne.

== Notable students ==
- Anselm Feuerbach
- Marie Wiegmann
- Amalie Bensinger
- Elisabeth Jerichau-Baumann
- Heinrich Ludwig Philippi
- Clemens Bewer
- Ludwig von Milewski

== Selected paintings ==
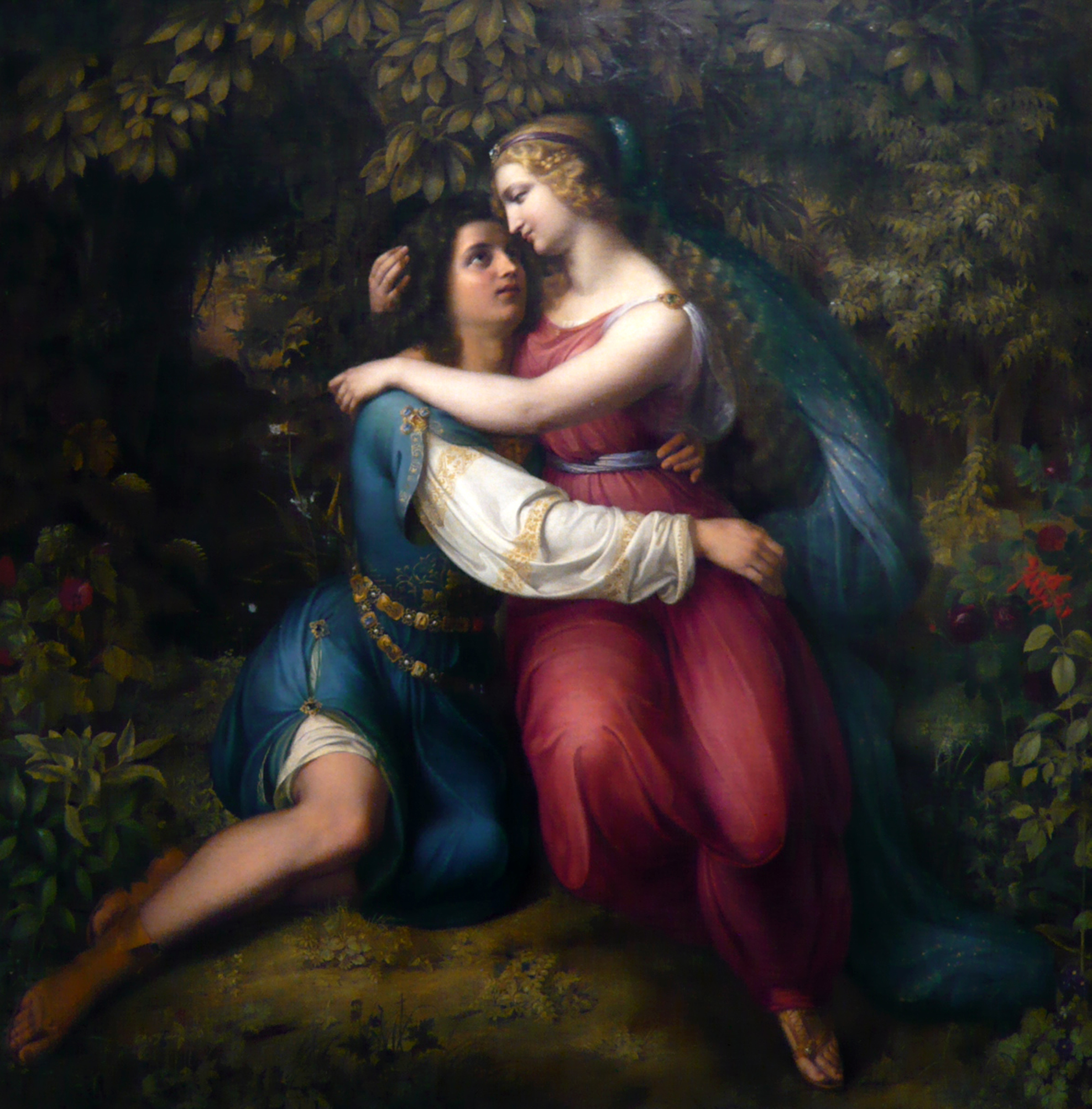
Rinaldo and Armida, 1828

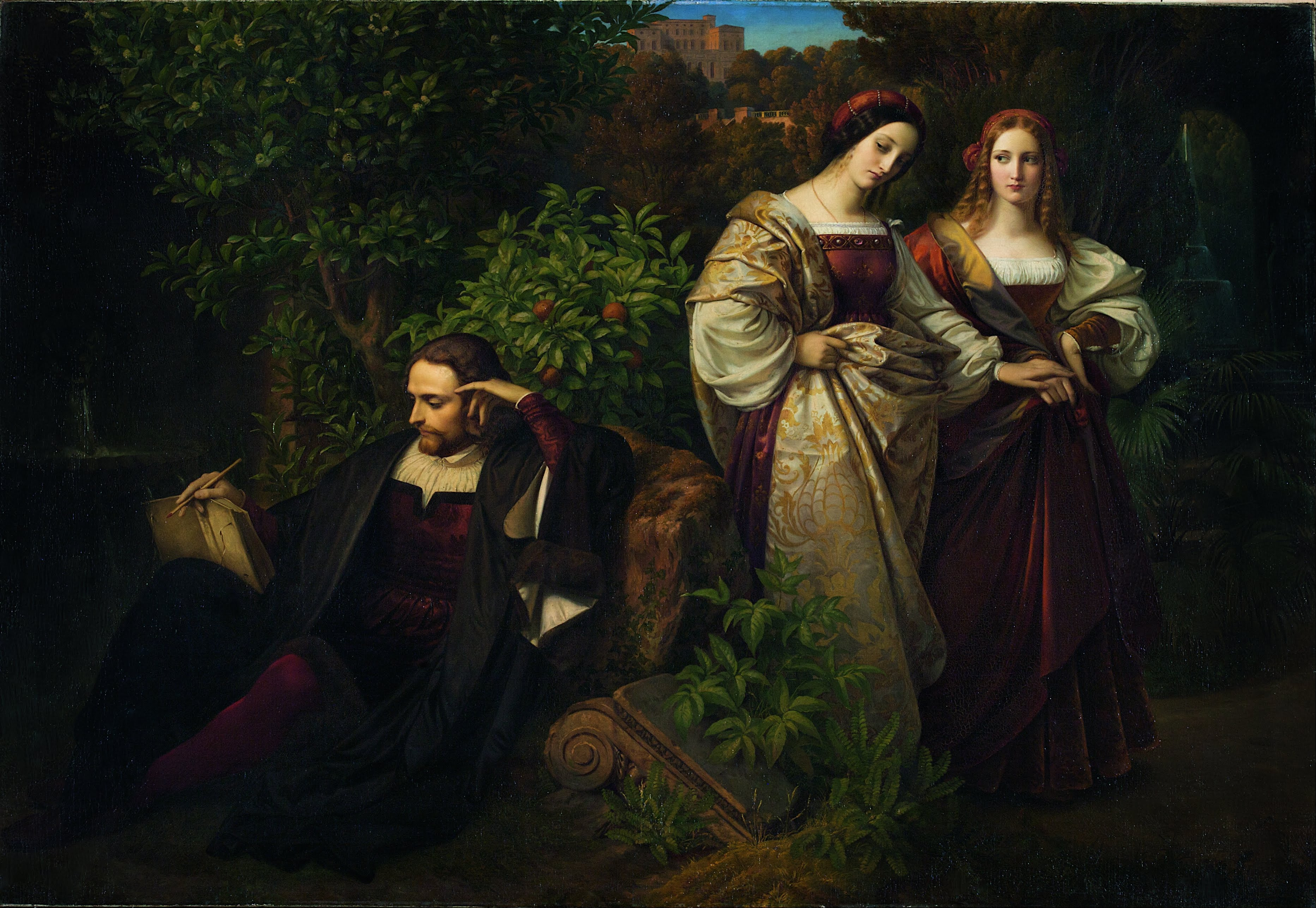
Torquato Tasso and the Two Leonores, 1839

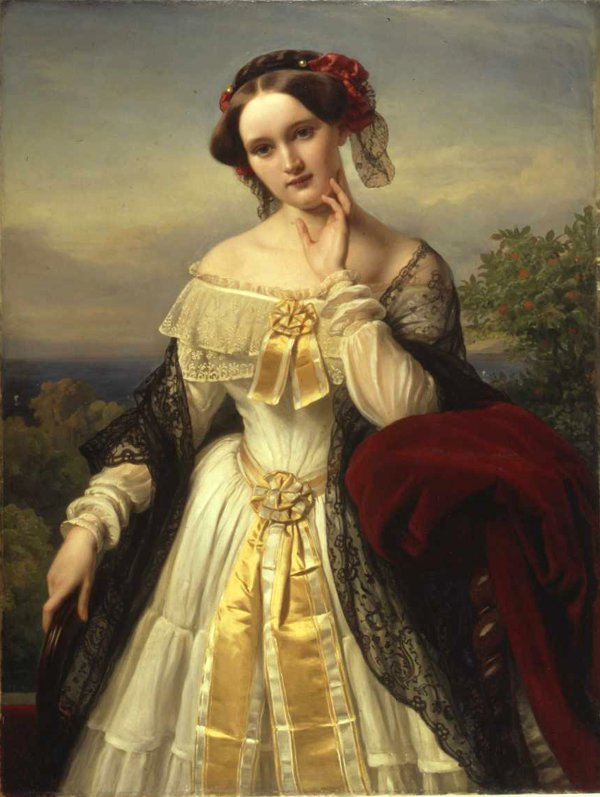
Mathilde Wesendonck

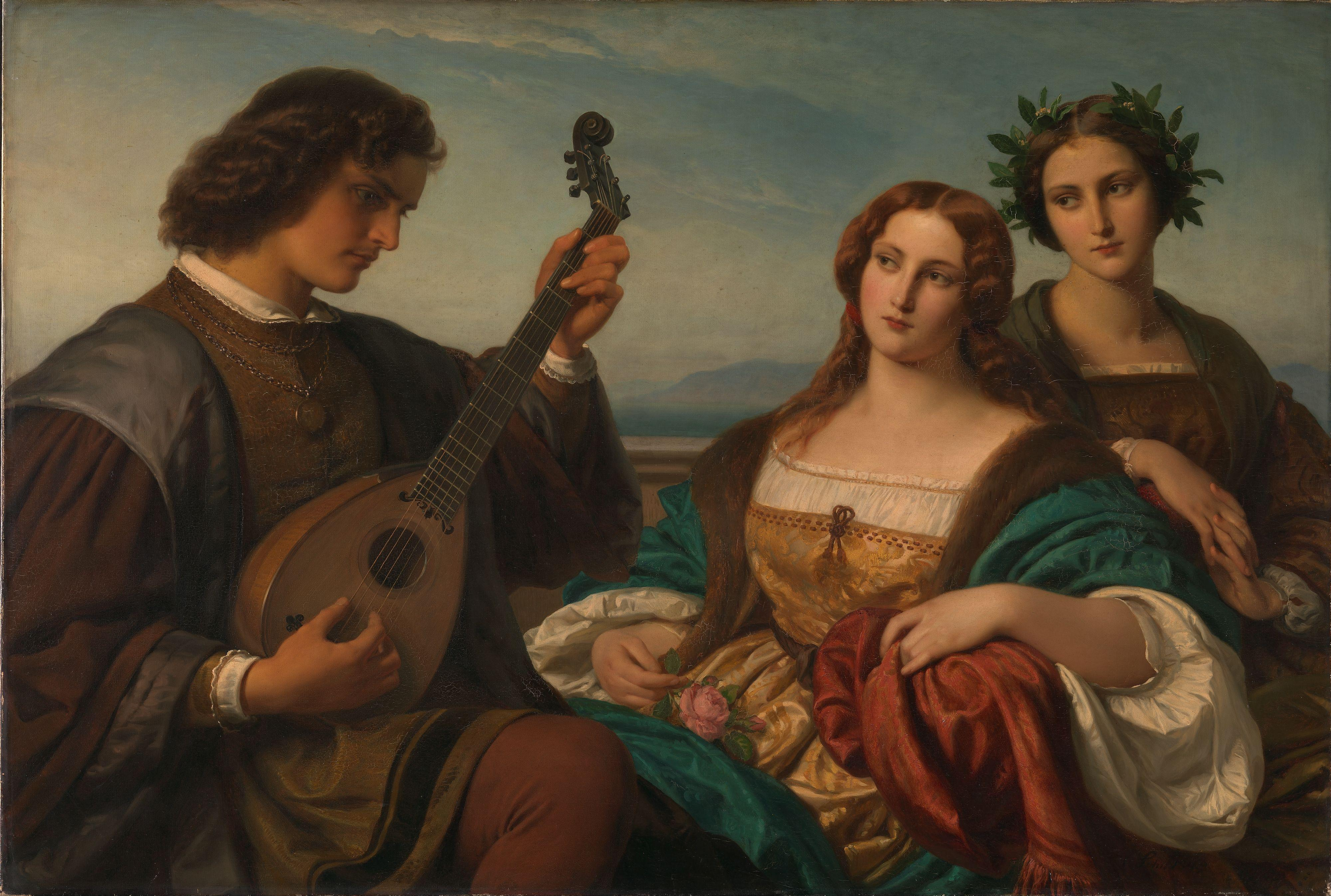
Minstrel and Two Listening Ladies, 1849. Depicting Torquato Tasso, Eleonora d'Este, and Leonora Sanvitale.

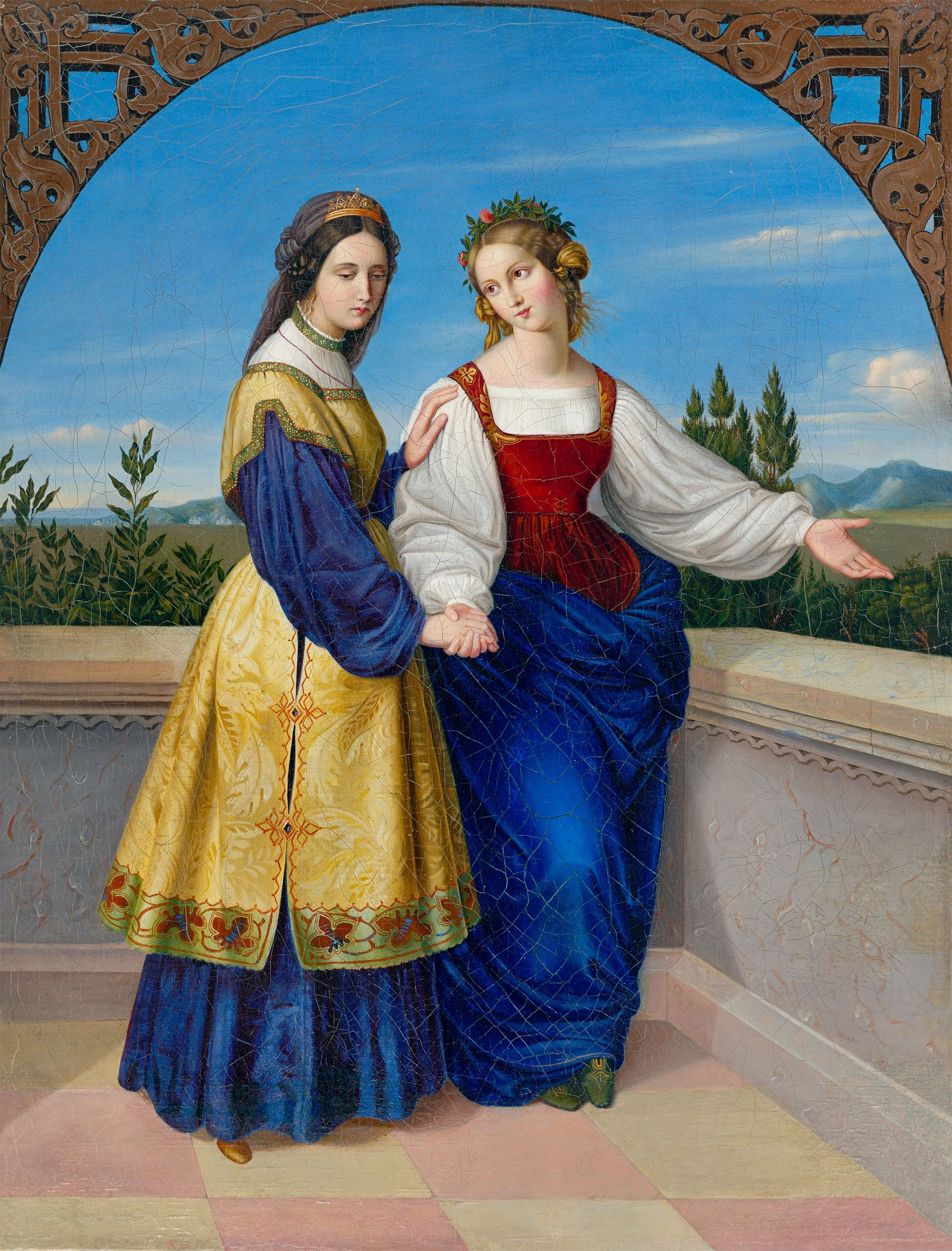
The Two Leonors, circa 1834

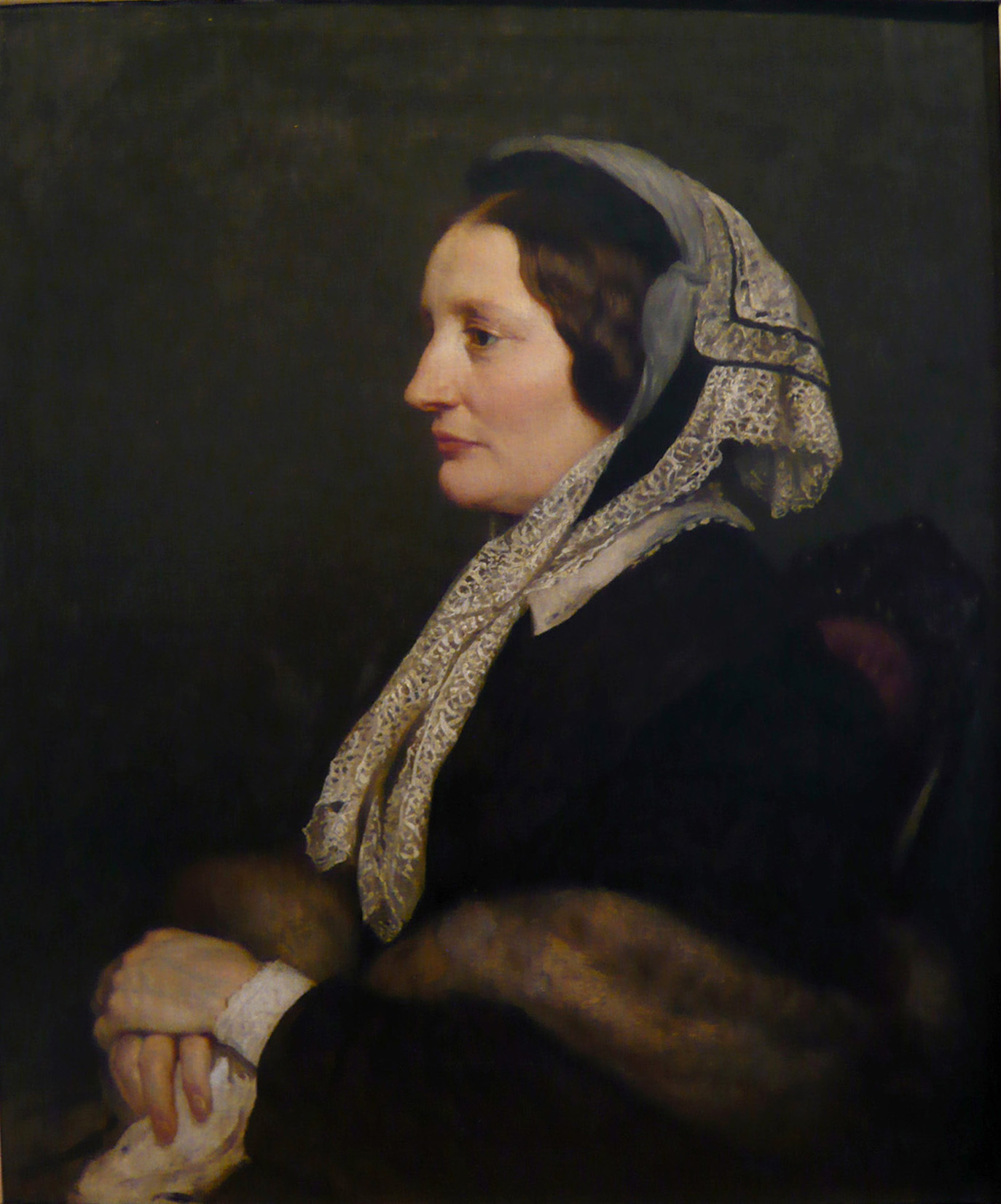
Portrait of Emilie Auguste Sohn by her husband

== Sources ==
- Max Georg Zimmermann (1892). "Sohn, Carl" . Allgemeine Deutsche Biographie (in German). Vol. 34. Leipzig: Duncker & Humblot. pp. 544–546.
- This article incorporates text from a publication now in the public domain: Gilman, D. C.; Peck, H. T.; Colby, F. M., eds. (1905). New International Encyclopedia (1st ed.). New York: Dodd, Mead.
