= Maurice Sterne =

American sculptor and painter (1877/78–1957)

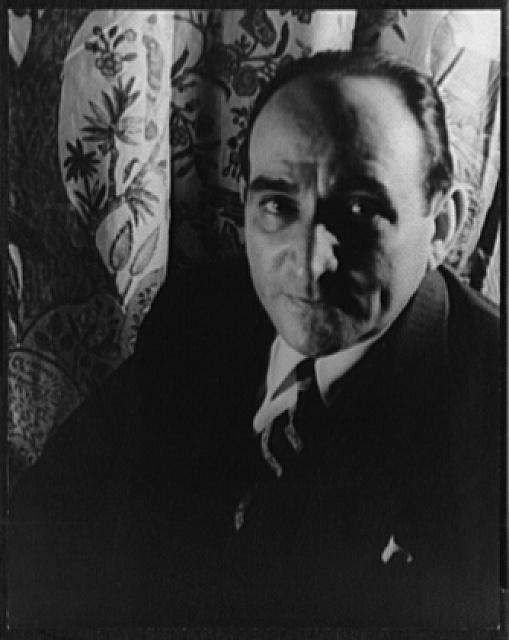
- Maurice Sterne (1933); Photo by Carl Van Vechten
- Born: 1877 or 1878; Liepāja, Latvia, Russian Empire
- Died: July 23, 1957 (aged 78–79); Mount Kisco, New York, US
- Resting place: Kensico Cemetery
- Education: National Academy of Design; Art Students League of New York
- Spouse: Mabel Dodge Luhan

Maurice Sterne (Latvian: Moriss Šterns, 1877 or 1878 (Note: Sterne himself was apparently never certain of the date of his birth.) – July 23, 1957) was an American sculptor and painter remembered for his association with philanthropist Mabel Dodge Luhan, to whom he was married from 1916 to 1923.

== Biography ==
Sterne was born in 1877 or 1878, in Liepāja, the youngest of five children to an Orthodox Jewish family living in the port city of Libau (Liepāja), Latvia, when it was part of the Russian Empire. After Sterne's father died, his mother moved the rest of the family to Moscow. In 1889 Sterne, his mother and sister were forced to leave Moscow, and sailed to New York City.

He began his career as a draftsman and painter. Critics noted the similarity of his work, in volume and weight, to sculpture. In the late 1890s, Sterne studied under Alfred Maurer and Thomas Eakins at the National Academy of Design, and then traveled widely in Europe and the Far East. A trip to Greece in 1908 introduced him to archaic Greek statues, inspiring him to experiment with the form himself in stone.

From 1911 to 1914, he and his friend Karli Sohn-Rethel, a German painter, traveled together to India, the Far East and settled in Bali to paint and sketch, which further informed his later work.

Sterne came to New Mexico in 1916 at the suggestion of his friend, Paul Burlin, and settled in Taos until 1918.

His reputation was established by a show at the Scott and Fowles Gallery in 1926 and furthered by a retrospective at the Museum of Modern Art in 1933. In the mid-1930s, Sterne lived in San Francisco and taught at the California School of Fine Arts. He returned to the East Coast in 1945 and established a studio in Mount Kisco, New York. He was named to the American Academy of Arts and Letters in 1938. From 1945 to 1950, he served on the U.S. Commission of Fine Arts.

In addition to his murals in the library of the Department of Justice in Washington, D.C., Sterne's works are in the collections of the Metropolitan Museum of Art, the Art Institute of Chicago, the Corcoran Gallery of Art, and the Phillips Collection. Sterne was one of a dozen sculptors invited to compete in the Pioneer Woman statue competition in 1927, but his model was not selected.

Sterne died on July 23, 1957, aged 78 or 79, in Mount Kisco, New York.

== Artwork ==
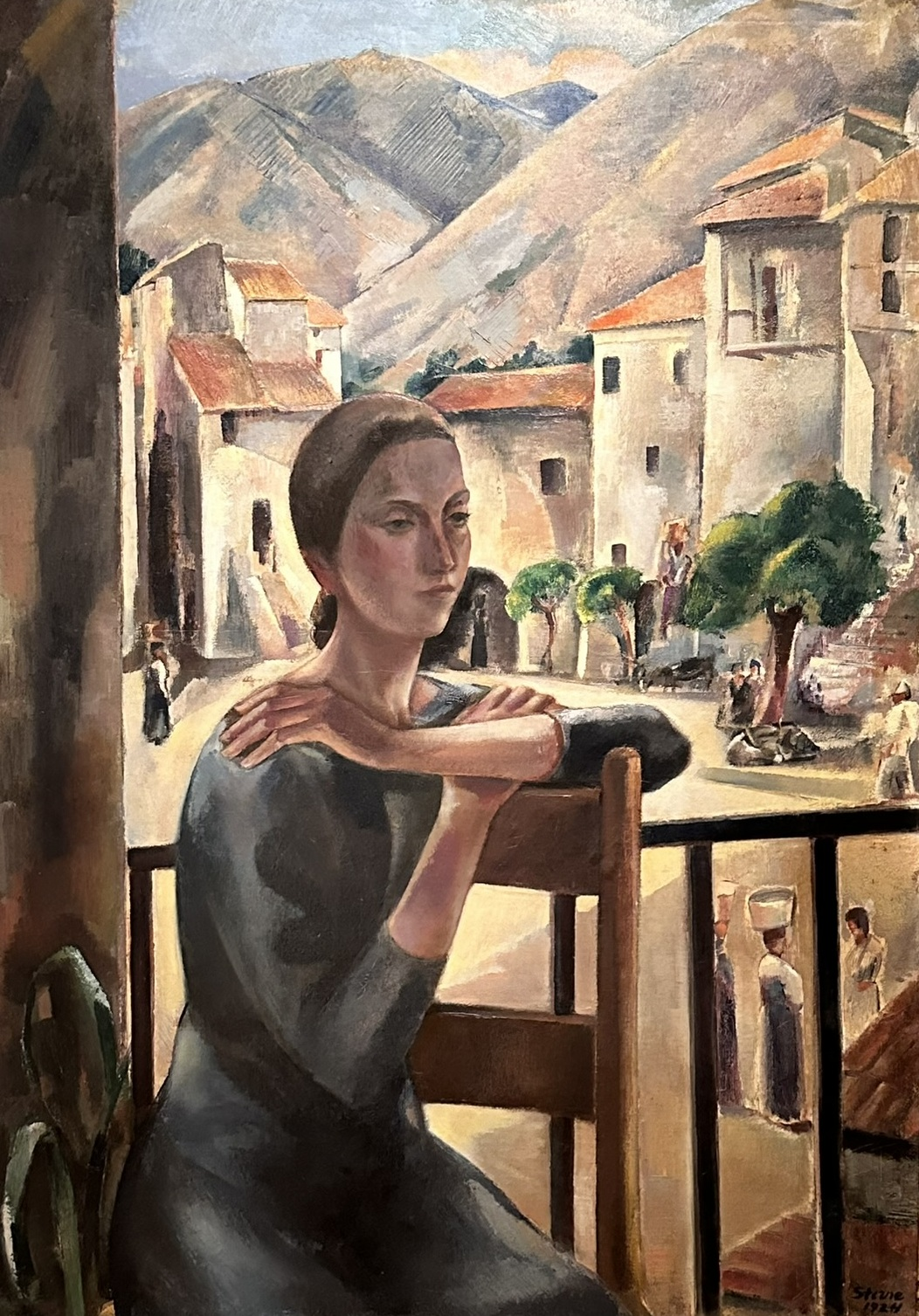
Afternoon, 1924, oil on canvas, in The Phillips Collection

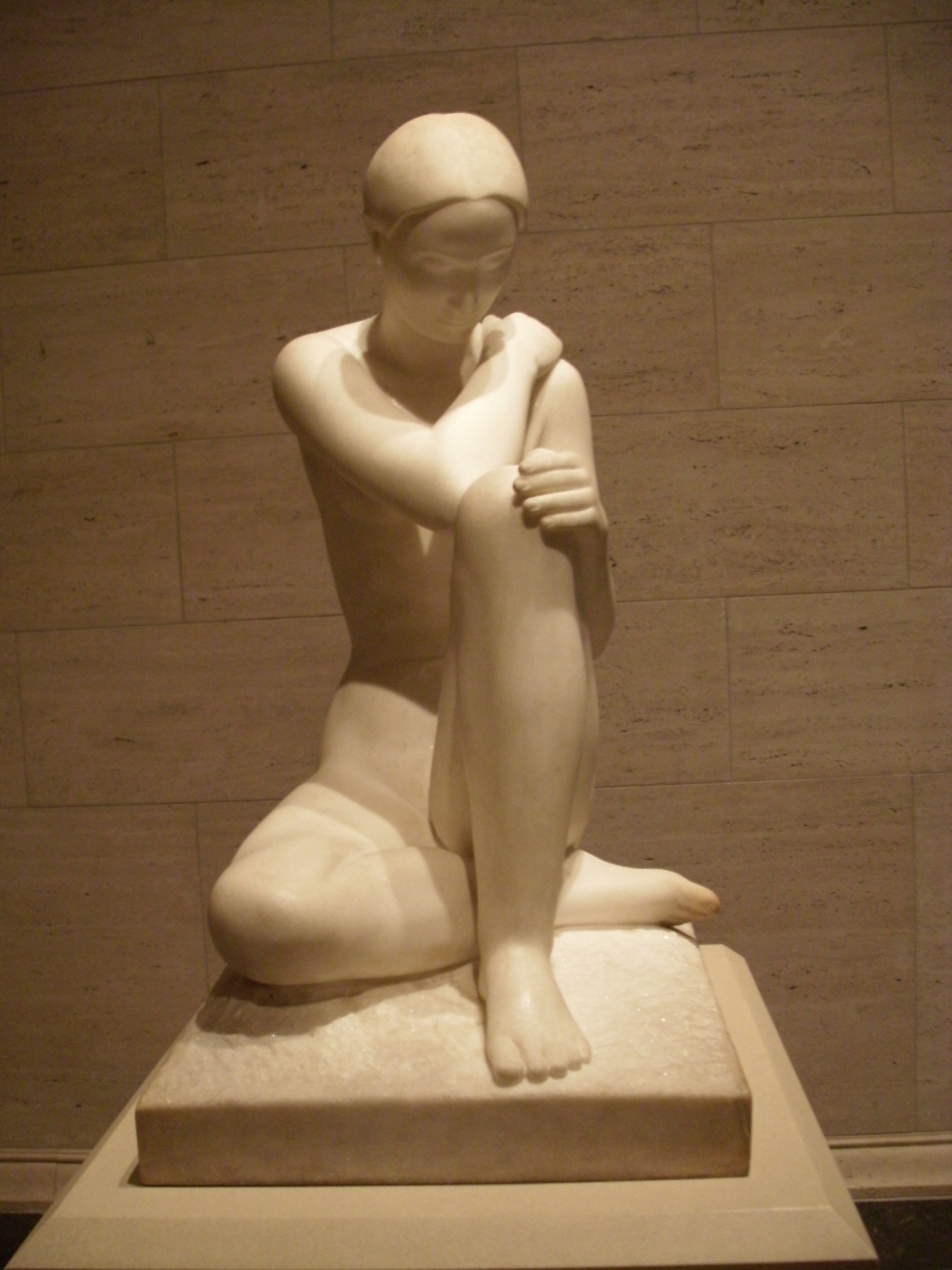
Sitting Figure, marble of 1932, in the National Gallery of Art

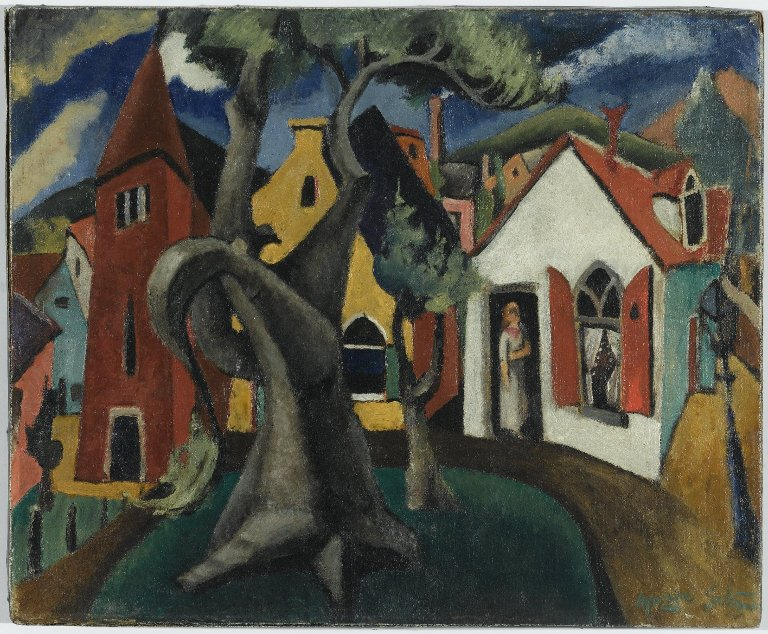
Village Scene by Maurice Sterne, in the Brooklyn Museum

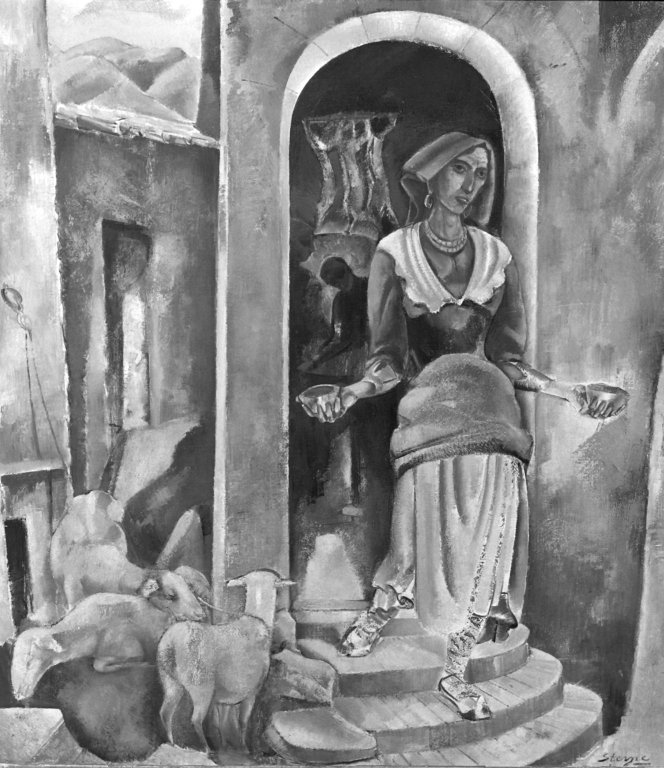
The Sacrifice - Maurice Sterne - in the Brooklyn Museum

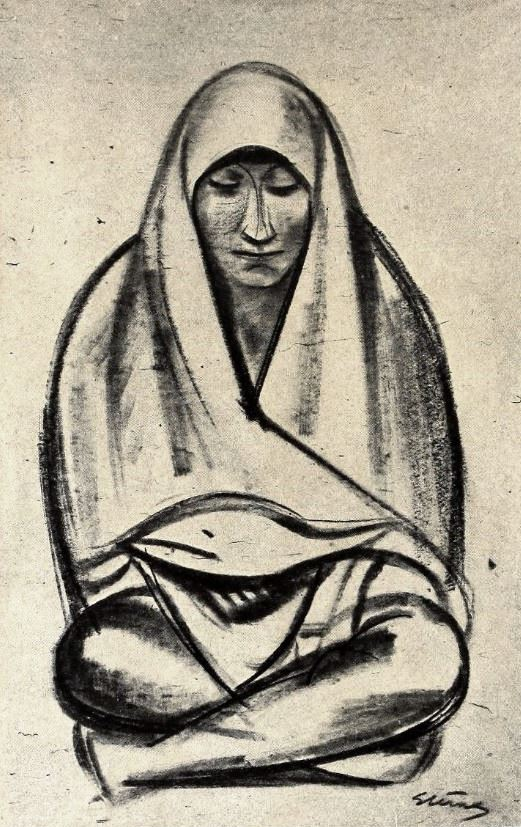
Maurice Sterne - Pueblo Indian - Apr 1923 Shadowland

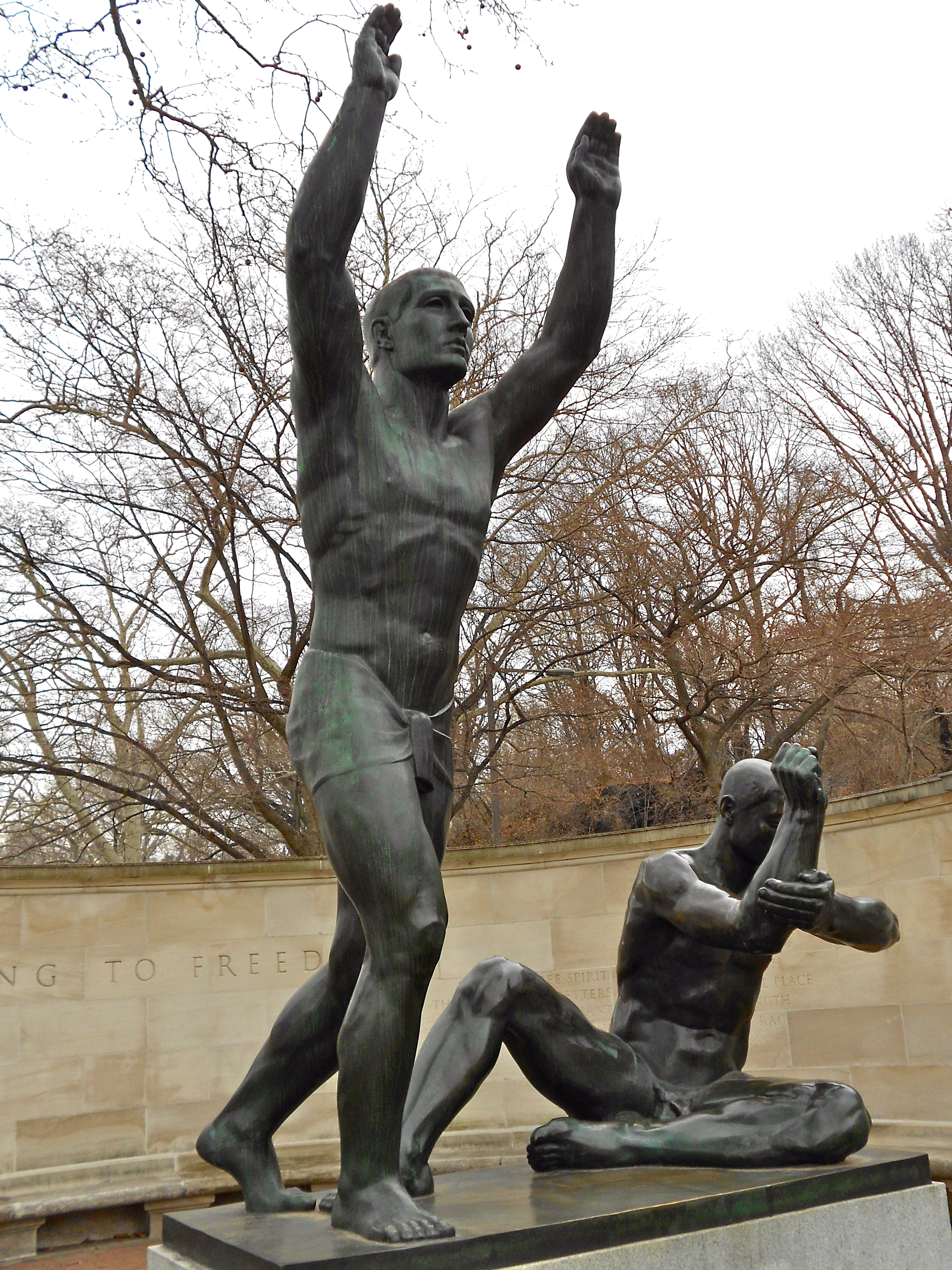
Ellen Phillips Samuel Memorial, public art in Philadelphia
