= August Grahl =

German painter (1791–1868)

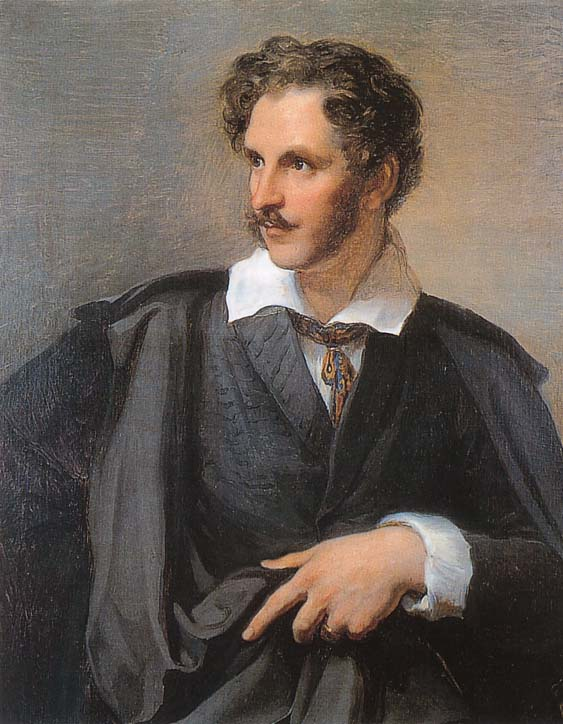
August Grahl. Portrait by Vincenzo Camuccini

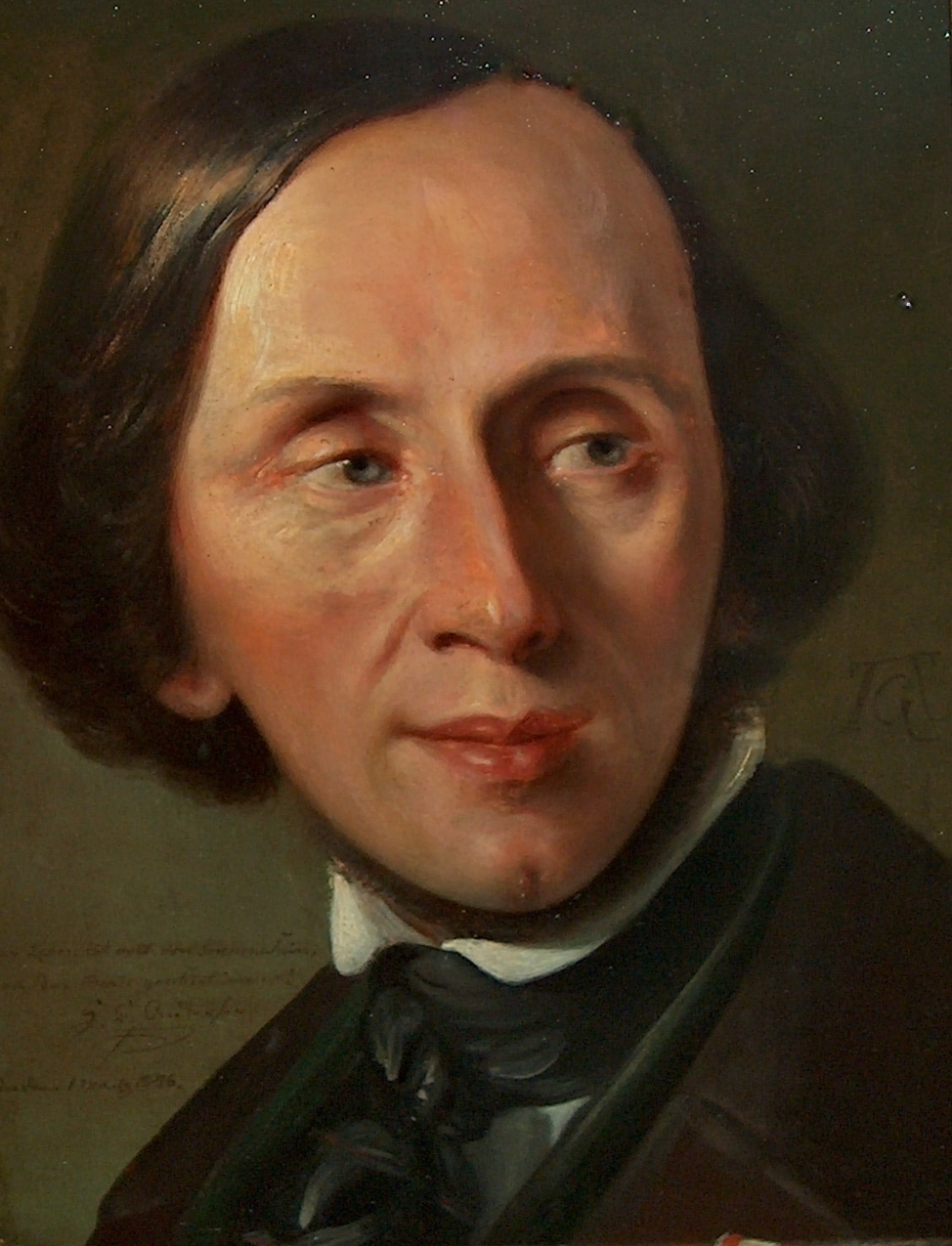
Hans Christian Andersen (1846)

August Grahl (26 May 1791, Göhren-Lebbin - 13 June 1868, Dresden) was a German portrait painter and miniaturist.

== Life ==
He was the son of the Court Jeweler to the Hohenzollerns. From 1811 to 1813, he studied at the Berlin University of the Arts. He quit school to join the Black Hussars of Ludwig Adolf Wilhelm von Lützow and fight in the War of Liberation. He retired with a commission.

His first success came in 1816, with a portrait of King Friedrich Wilhelm III. In 1817/18, he took a trip to Italy, visiting Rome, Florence, Venice and Bologna. Following his wife's death in 1821, after only two years of marriage, he began travelling more extensively, ending in Rome where he lived until 1830 at the Palazzo Caffarelli. It was there that he met his second wife, the daughter of a wealthy banker from Königsberg. He spent 1831 in England, where he painted a portrait of Queen Adelaide that was later made into an engraving by Samuel William Reynolds. In 1832, he returned to Germany to get married and moved to Dresden in 1835, remaining there except for a brief period from 1853 to 1855, when he returned to Rome to attend to his son-in-law, the painter Alfred Rethel, who was suffering from a severe episode of depression.

He is probably best known for his portrait of Hans Christian Andersen, which is on display at the Andersen Museum in Odense. Another familiar work is his portrait of Gabriele von Bülow, Wilhelm von Humboldt's daughter. He was also a significant art collector, possessing a large selection of Italian paintings and lithographs. Virtually all of his miniatures are still privately owned.

His granddaughter was artist, Else Sohn-Rethel.
