= Else Sohn-Rethel =

German painter (1853–1933)

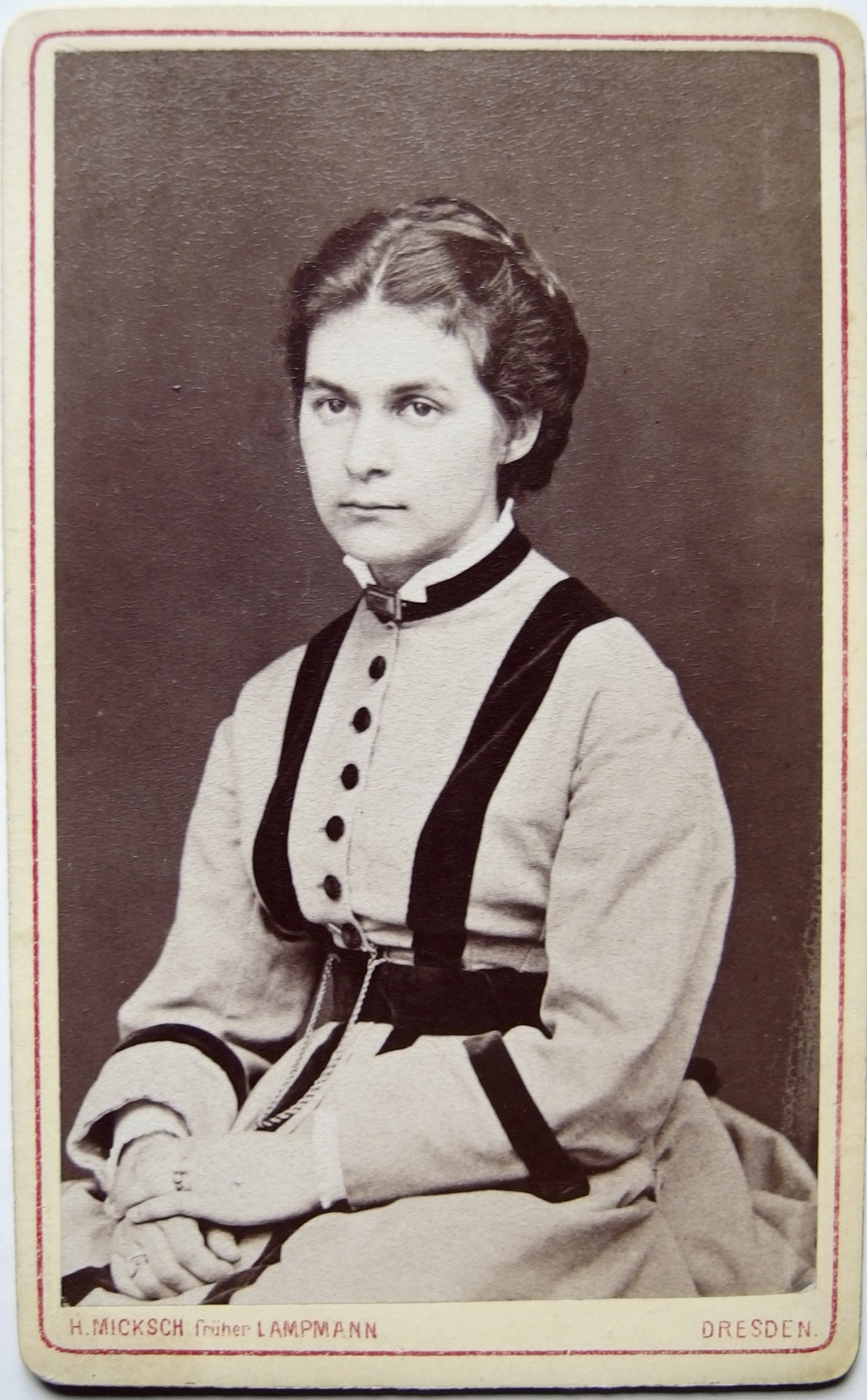
- Else Sohn-Rethel (c.1870) in Dresden, Germany
- Born: Elisabeth Johanna Martha Maria Rethel; 14 March 1853; Rome, Papal States
- Died: 22 January 1933 (aged 79); Düsseldorf, German Reich
- Resting place: Nordfriedhof (Dresden)
- Occupation(s): singer, painter
- Spouse: Karl Rudolf Sohn
- Children: Alfred Sohn-Rethel, Otto Sohn-Rethel, Karli Sohn-Rethel, Mira Sohn-Rethel Heuser

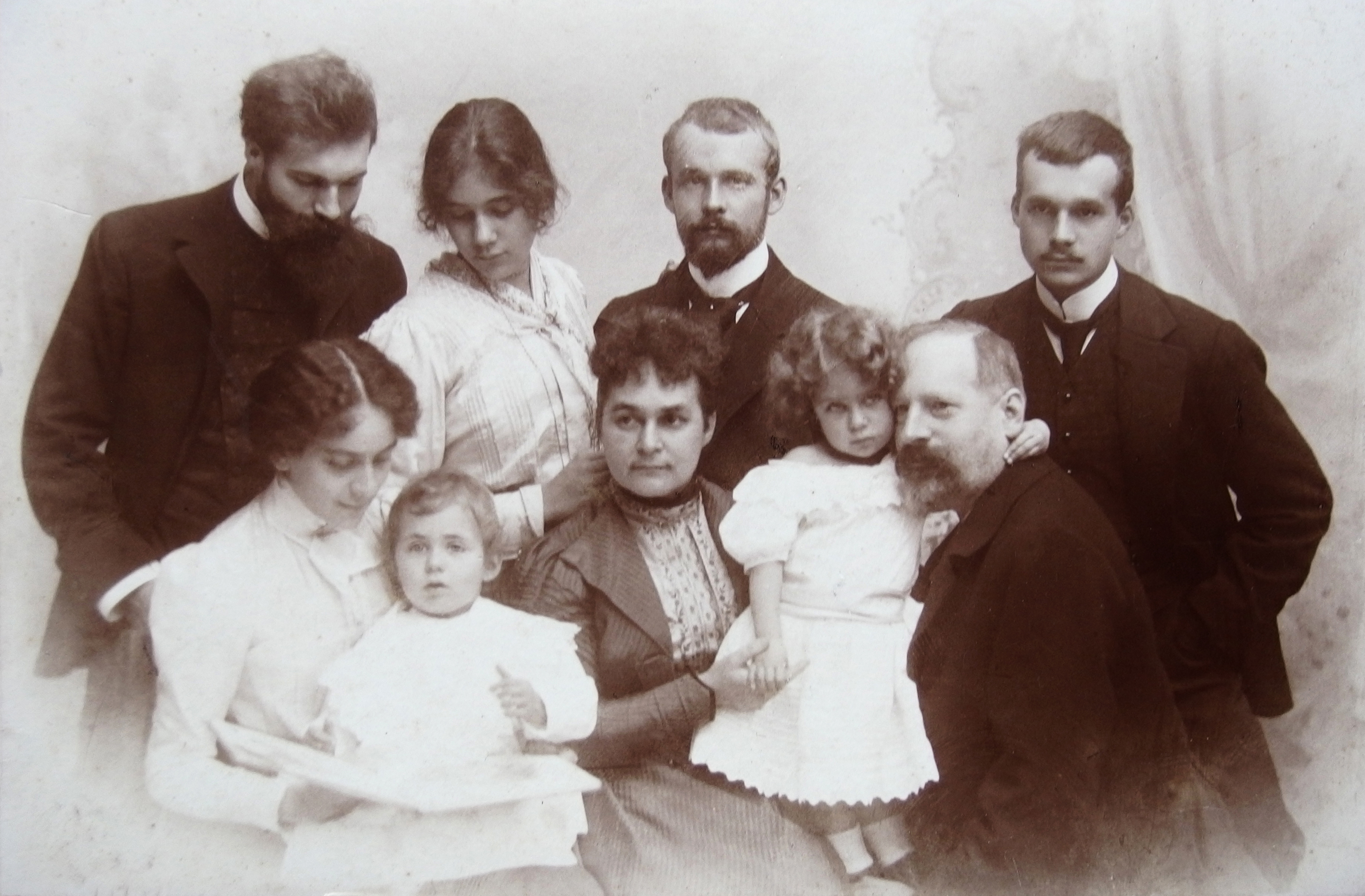
A Sohn-Rethel family photo, ca.1900

Elisabeth "Else" Johanna Martha Maria Sohn-Rethel (14 March 1853 – 22 January 1933) was a German painter and singer, active in the mid and late 19th-century.

== Biography ==
Elisabeth Johanna Martha Maria Rethel was born 14 March 1853 in Rome, Papal States, into an upper class German Jewish family. Her mother was Marie Elisabeth Henrietta Philippina Grahl and her father was history painter, Alfred Rethel. She was a descendant on her maternal line of the noble Oppenheim family, her great grandfather was banker Martin Wilhelm Oppenheim. Her maternal grandfather was miniature painter and portraitist, August Grahl, and she was raised by her mother and maternal grandparents at Villa Rosa (in Dresden) due to her father's mental health issues.

In 1873, she married painter Karl Rudolf Sohn at the Loschwitz Church in Dresden. After marriage she moved to Düsseldorf, where her husband's family lived. Between 1860 and 1900, she took up the profession of singing because they needed more income, and as result she was welcomed in to Düsseldorf high society and would often perform at salons and other social gatherings.

On 8 February 1875, Sohn-Rethel gave birth to her eldest son, Alfred Sohn-Rethel. Her other children included Otto Sohn-Rethel (1877–1949), Karli Sohn-Rethel (1882–1966), and Mira Sohn-Rethel Heuser (1884–1974). The three sons became painters and her daughter married painter, Werner Heuser.

In 1928, Sohn-Rethel wrote her memoirs, which was later edited and published as a book in 2016.

Sohn-Rethel died on 22 January 1933 at her home in Düsseldorf, a few days before Adolf Hitler seized power. She was buried in Nordfriedhof cemetery in Düsseldorf.

== Publications ==
- Pleschinski, Hans (2016). I Was Happy Whether it Was Raining or Not: the Memoirs of Else Sohn-Rethel. CHBeck. ISBN 9783406691669.
