= Alfred Rethel =

German painter (1816–1859)

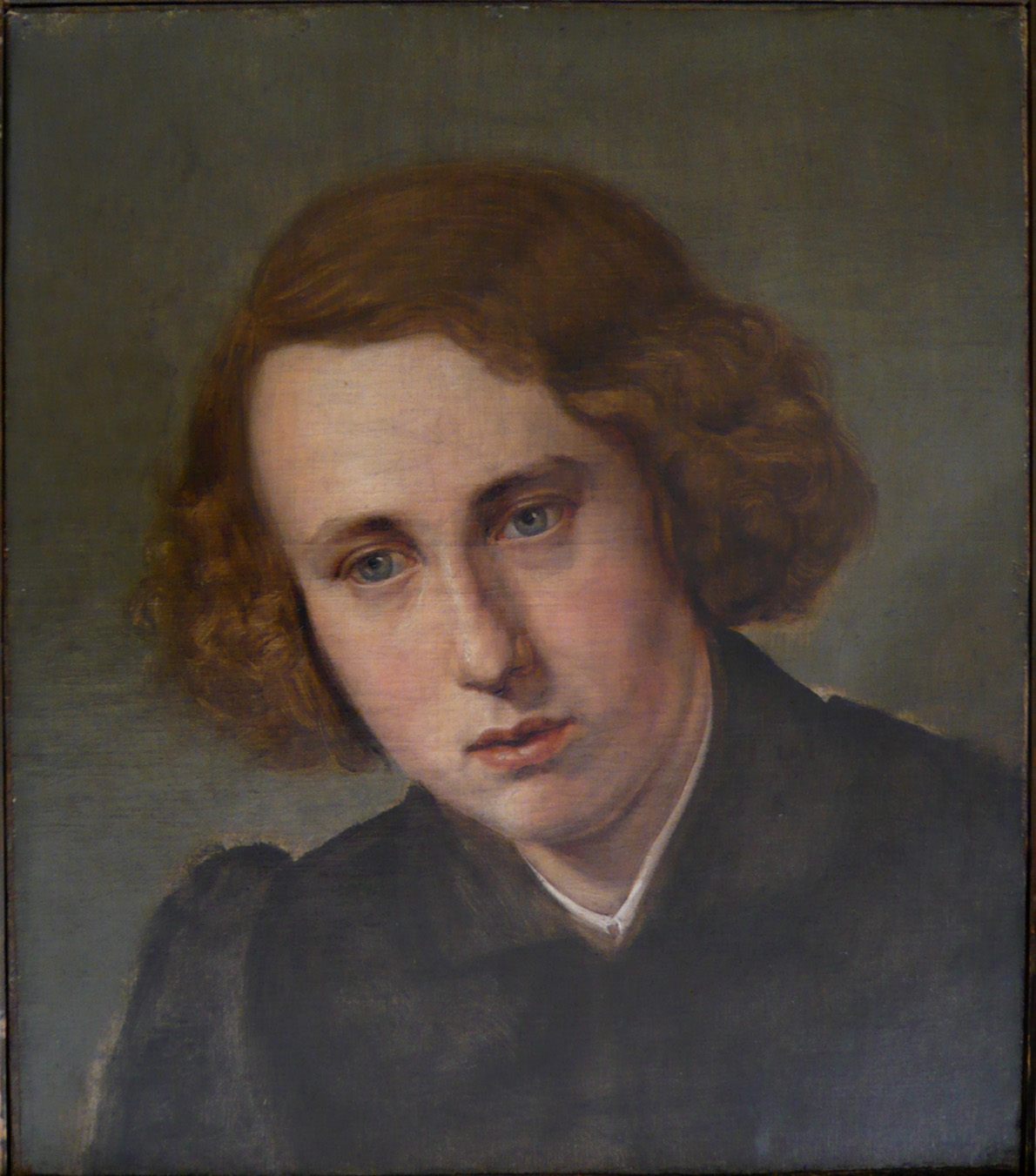
Self portrait, 1832

Alfred Rethel (May 15, 1816 – December 1, 1859) was a German history painter.

== Early life and education ==
Rethel was born in Aachen in 1816. He showed an interest in art in his early life, and at the age of thirteen he executed a drawing which procured his admission to the Kunstakademie Düsseldorf. Here he studied for several years, and produced, among other works, a figure of St Boniface, which attracted much attention.

== Career ==
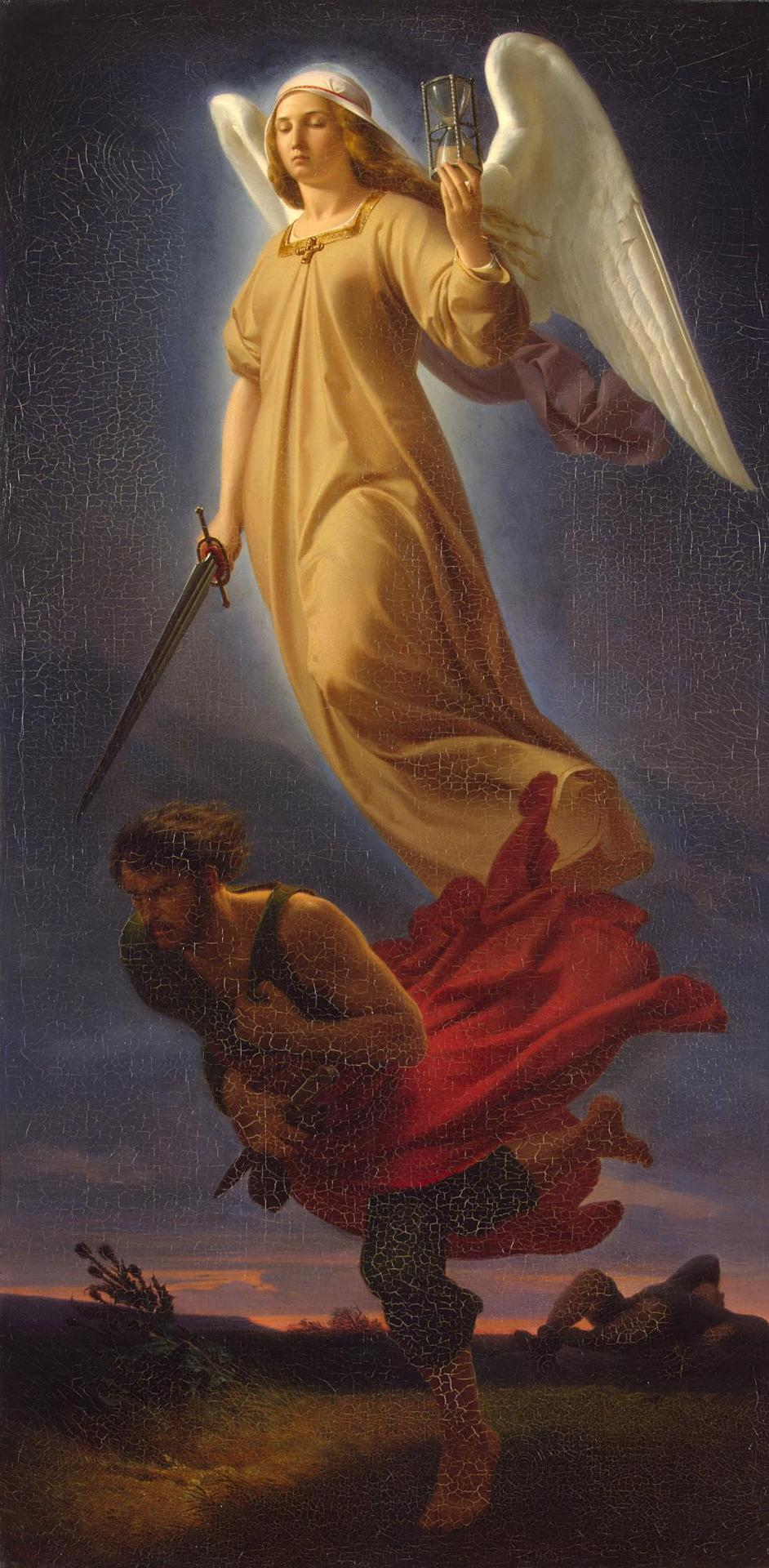
Nemesis, 1837

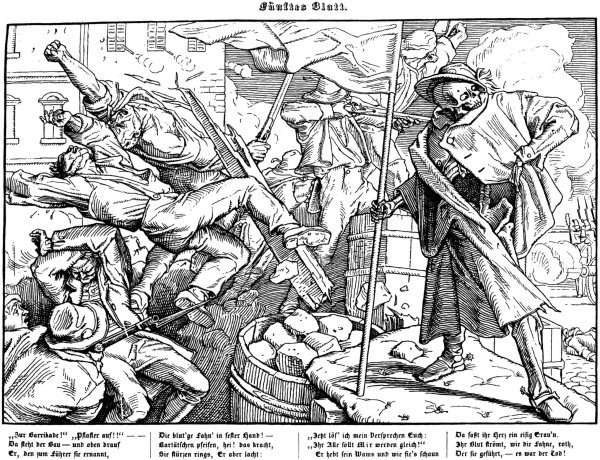
Dance of Death, 1848

At the age of twenty, Rethel moved to Frankfurt, and was selected to decorate the walls of the imperial hall in the Römer with Fresco paintings of figures of famous men. At the same period he produced a series of designs illustrative of Old Testament history. Four years later, Rethel was the successful competitor for the work of ornamenting the restored council house of his native city with frescoes depicting prominent events in the career of Charlemagne, but the execution of this work was delayed for some six years. Meanwhile, Rethel occupied himself with the production of easel pictures and of drawings. In 1842, he began a striking series of designs dealing with the Crossing of the Alps by Hannibal, in which the weird power which animates his later art becomes first apparent.

In 1844, Rethel visited Rome, executing, along with other subjects, an altar-piece for one of the churches of his native land. In 1846, he returned to Aachen, and commenced his Charlemagne frescoes. But mental derangement, attributed, it is believed, to an accident that he suffered in childhood, began to manifest itself. While he hovered between madness and sanity, Rethel produced some of the most striking, individual, and impressive of his works. Strange legends are told of the effect produced by some of his weird subjects. He painted Nemesis pursuing a murderer across a flat stretch of landscape. A slaughtered body lies on the ground, while in front is the assassin speeding away into the darkness, and above an angel of vengeance. The picture, so the story goes, was won in a lottery at Frankfurt by a personage of high rank, who had been guilty of an undiscovered crime, and the contemplation of his prize drove him mad.

Another design which Rethel executed was "Death the Avenger," a skeleton appearing at a masked ball, scraping daintily, like a violinist, upon two human bones. The drawing haunted the memory of his artist friends and disturbed their dreams; and, in expiation, he produced his pathetic design of "Death the Friend." Rethel also executed a powerful series of drawings "The Dance of Death" suggested by the Belgian insurrections of 1848. It is by such designs as these, executed in a technique founded upon that of Albrecht Dürer, and animated by an imagination akin to that of the elder master, that Rethel is most widely known.

== Death ==
Alfred Rethel died on December 1, 1859, in Düsseldorf from the effects of a brain disease. In his last years, his brother Otto Rethel (1822–1892) took care of him, as well as his young wife Marie Grahl, the daughter of August Grahl, and their daughter Else Sohn-Rethel.

Rethel's picture of "Peter and John at the Beautiful Gate of the Temple" is preserved in the Leipzig Museum, and his picture of "St Boniface" and several of his cartoons for the frescoes are preserved in the Berlin National Gallery. Rethel's Life by Wolfgang Müller von Königswinter was published in 1861.

== Literature ==
- Auch ein Todtentanz. Elischer, Leipzig 1891. Digitalisierte Ausgabe - DFG-Viewer, University Library Düsseldorf
