= Max Clarenbach =

German painter (1880–1952)

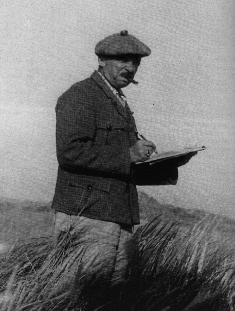
- Born: 19 May 1880; Neuss, German Empire
- Died: 9 July 1952 (aged 72); Wittlaer, Düsseldorf, West Germany
- Occupation: Painter

Max Clarenbach (19 May 1880 – 9 July 1952) was a German painter. His work was part of the art competitions at the 1928 Summer Olympics and the 1932 Summer Olympics.
