= Benser =

Benser is a German surname. Notable people with the surname include:

- Günter Benser (1931–2025), German Marxist historian
- Ursula Benser (1915–2001), German painter and draftsperson
- Walther Benser (1912–2002), German photographer, photo journalist and merchant
