= Heuser =

Heuser is a German surname. Notable people with the surname include:

- Beatrice Heuser (born 1961), German historian and political scientist
- Harro Heuser (1927–2011), German mathematician
- Helena Heuser, Danish model
- Herman Heuser (1872–1933), American Roman Catholic priest and writer
- John Heuser (born 1942), American biophysicist
- Jürgen Heuser (born 1953), German weightlifter
- Klaus Heuser (born 1957), German musician
- Loni Heuser (1908–1999), German actress
- Ursula Heuser, also known as Ursula Benser (1915–2001), German painter
- Werner Heuser (1880–1964), German painter and professor

== See also ==
- Heuser Nunatak, nunatak of Victoria Land, Antarctica
