= Walter Ophey =

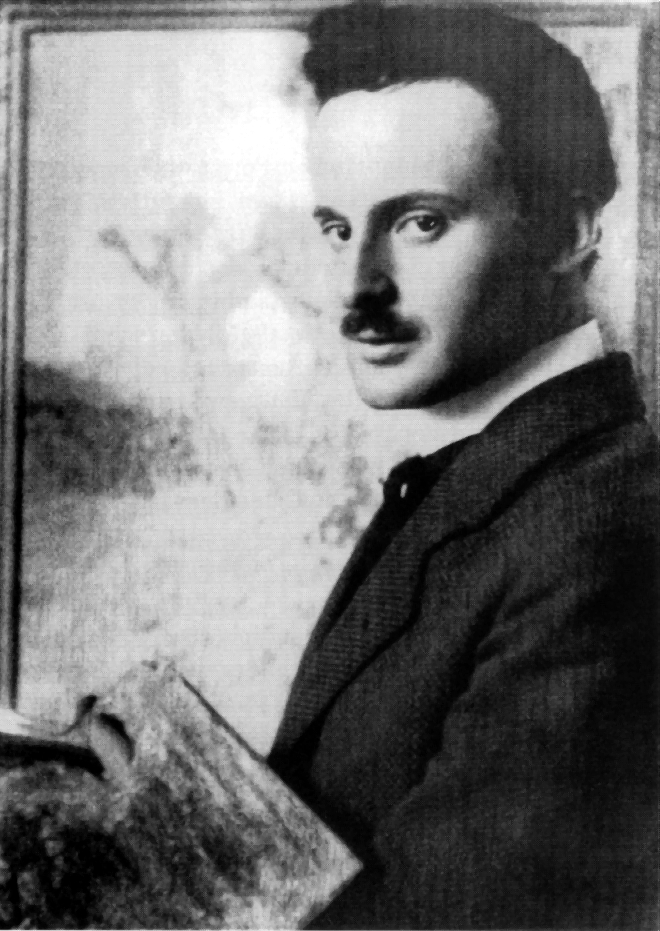
- Walter Ophey (1908)
- Born: 25 March 1882; Eupen, Belgium
- Died: 11 January 1930 (aged 47); Düsseldorf, Germany
- Education: Kunstakademie Düsseldorf
- Spouse: Bernhardine Bornemann

Walter Hugo Ophey (25 March 1882 – 11 January 1930) was a German painter and graphic designer, known for Rhenish Expressionism. He was a member of the Sonderbund group and Young Rhineland art groups.

== Biography ==
Walter Hugo Ophey was born on 25 March 1882 in Eupen, Germany (now Belgium) to Louise Haeber and accountant Emil Ophey. His father died in December 1888 and his mother returned to work, teaching music lessons. He studied with sculptor Karl Krauss (1859–1906) in 1900. He attended Kunstakademie Düsseldorf (Düsseldorf Art Academy) and studied under Fritz Roeber and Willy Spatz (1861–1931).

In 1912, Ophey joined the Sonderbund group with other Düsseldorf painters, Julius Bretz, Max Clarenbach, August Deusser, Wilhelm Schmurr, and brothers Karli Sohn-Rethel, Otto Sohn-Rethel and Alfred Sohn-Rethel.

On 12 February 1917, Walter Ophey married Bernhardine Bornemann (1879–1968).

In 1919, he was a founding member of Young Rhineland (Das Junge Rheinland) art association, alongside Werner Heuser, Heinrich Nauen, Adolf Uzarski, Arthur Kaufmann, Carlo Mense, and architect Wilhelm Kreis.

His work is in the public museum collection at Stadtmuseum Landeshauptstadt Düsseldorf (City Museum State Capital Düsseldorf), Städel Museum, Los Angeles County Museum of Art (LACMA), among others. In 1954, Museum Kunstpalast acquired the Ophey estate and now hold the largest collection of his work.

The art exhibition "Walter Ophey, Show Your Colors!", was shown in 2018–2019 at Museum Kunstpalast, and 2019–2020 at Kulturspeicher Würzburg.

== Gallery ==
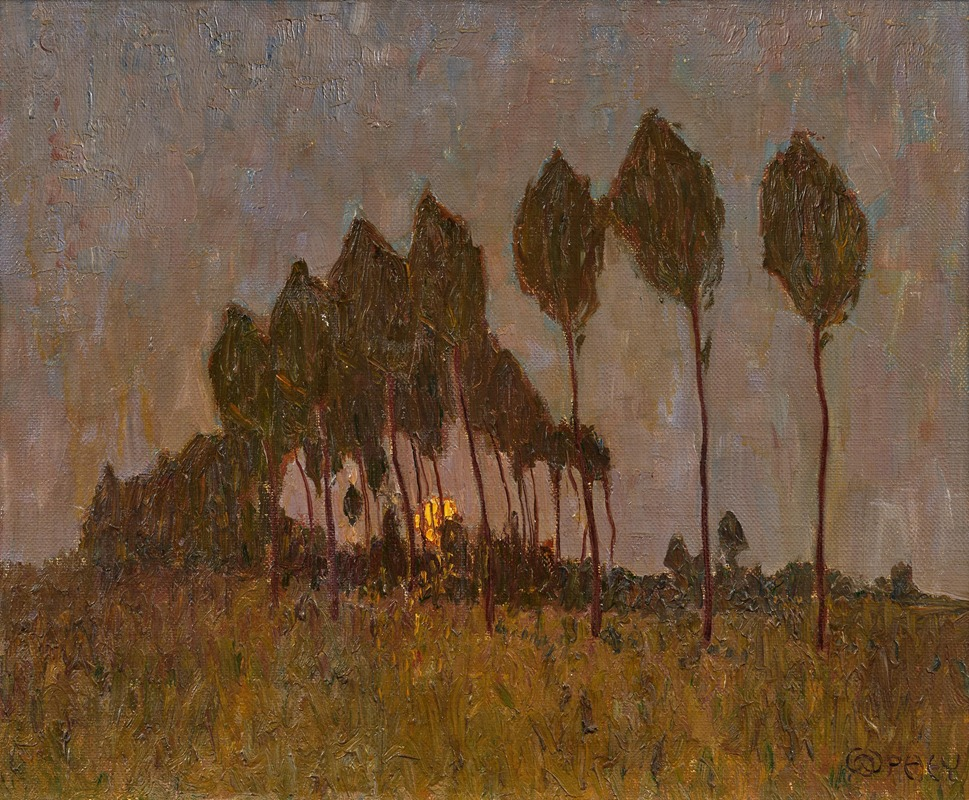
'Rising Moon' (1905)

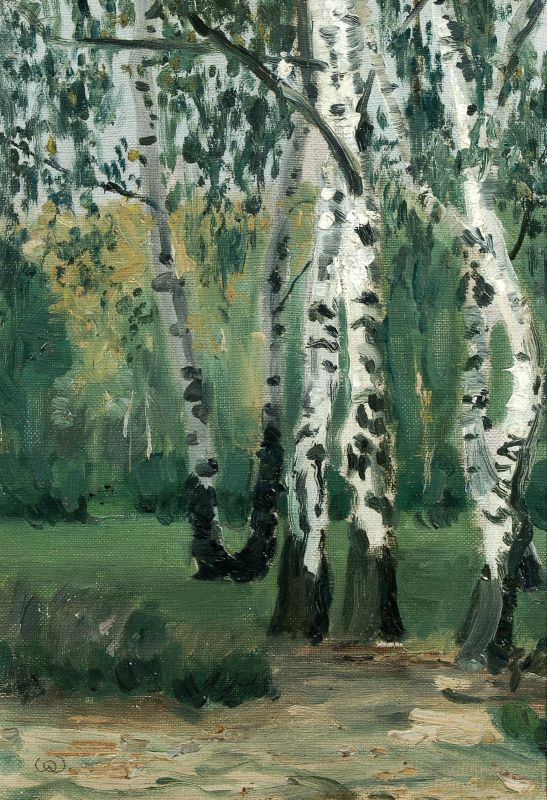
Ophey, "Birches on the Edge of the Heather" (c.1904/1905), oil on canvas

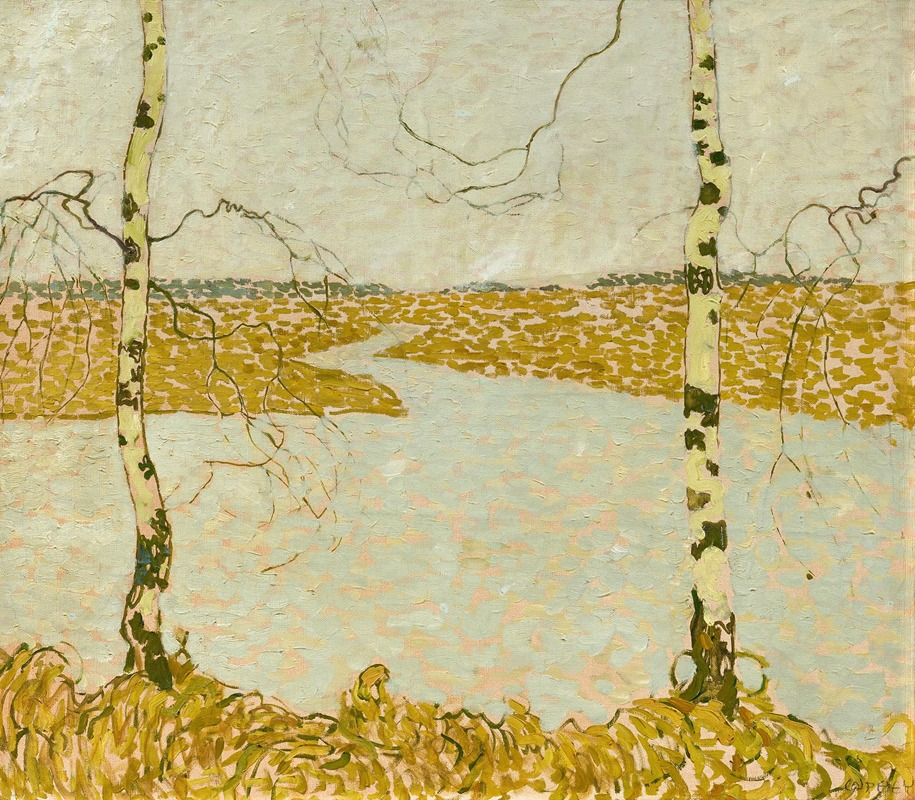
'Dachau Moor' (1907)

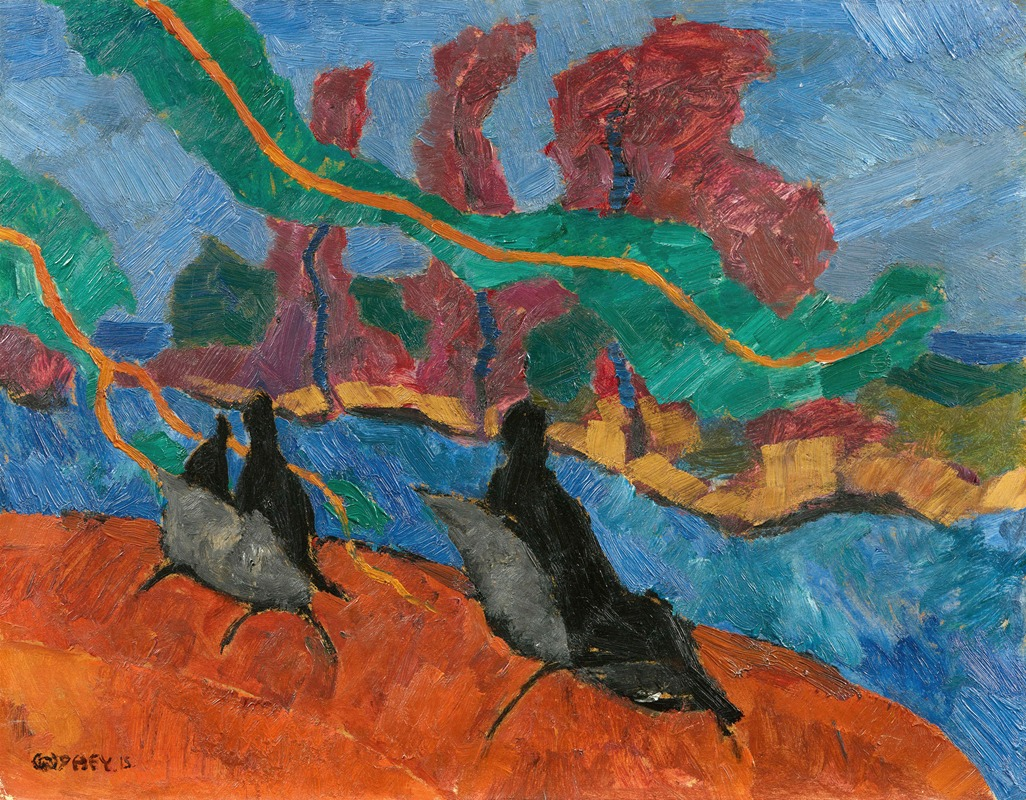
'In the Hof Garden' (1915)
