= Adalbert Trillhaase =

German painter

Adalbert Fritz August Trillhaase (January 7, 1858 – May 12, 1936) was a German painter.

== Life ==
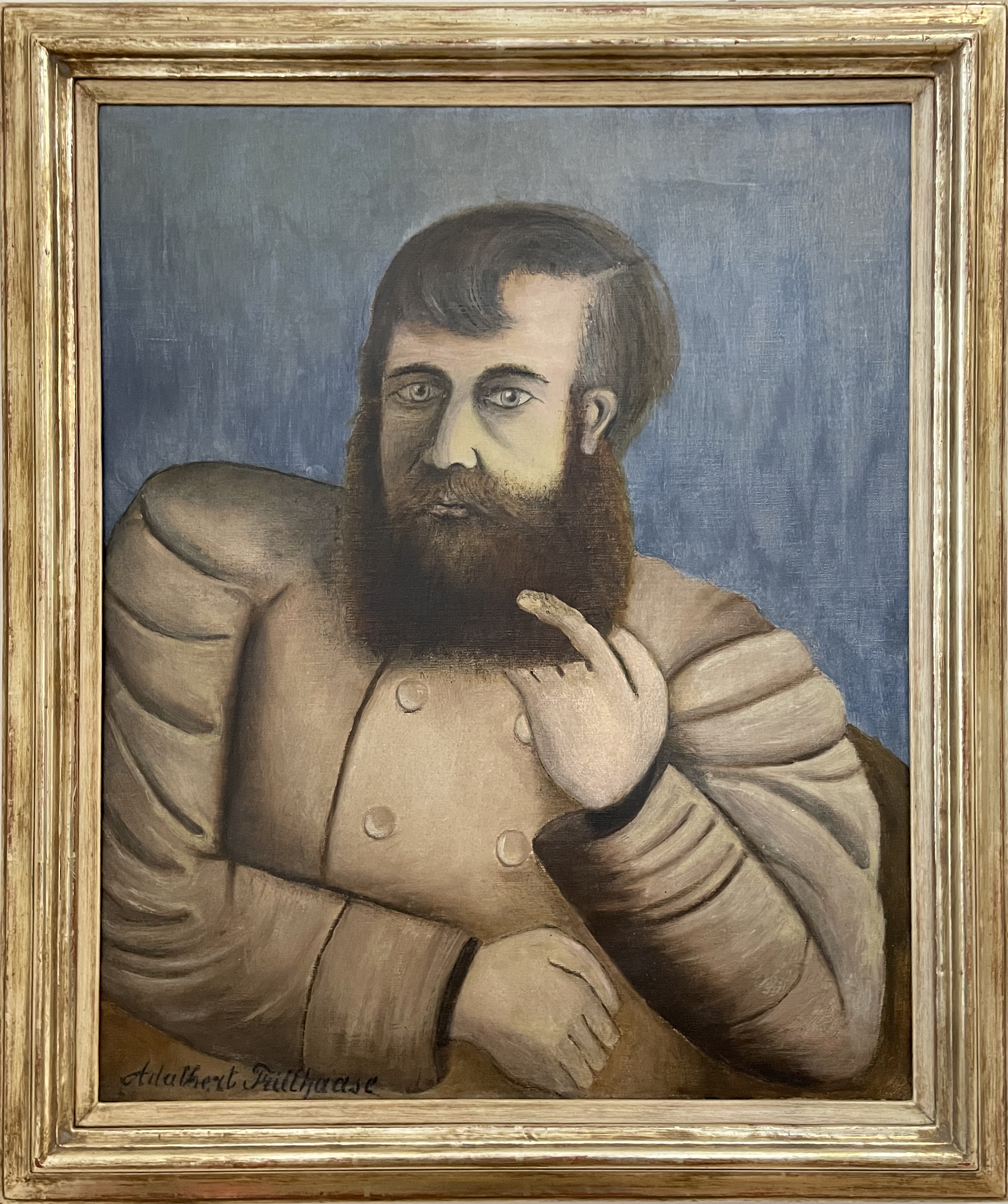
Adalbert Trillhaase: Portrait of Otto Pankow, 1920s, Otto Pankok Museum, Hünxe

Adalbert Trillhaase came from a middle-class, religious merchant family in Erfurt. After finishing school, he completed a commercial apprenticeship. Before 1890, he married Augusta Löhrer, the daughter of a wealthy merchant family from Hattingen an der Ruhr. Around 1890, he ran a linen factory in Bielefeld. The couple had three children, including their son Siegfried, born in 1892, who became a lawyer and self-taught painter. Trillhaase settled in Düsseldorf for the first time in 1894 at the latest. In 1896, he moved with his family to Stuttgart, and shortly afterwards to Hagen in Westphalia, where he worked as the managing director of an iron factory. After inheriting a substantial fortune following the death of his father-in-law, he returned to Düsseldorf in 1899, invested the money in real estate, and managed it. He lived in the Netherlands for a time during the First World War, returning to Düsseldorf in 1919.

He spent his time reading, mainly travel stories and the Bible, especially the Old Testament. It was not until later in life, but no later than 1918, that he began to teach himself to paint. Through his son Siegfried, who also painted, he was introduced to Otto Pankok in 1919 and became part of Mutter Ey's circle. Pankok, a protagonist of the “Junges Rheinland” (Young Rhineland) artists' group, encouraged Trillhaase in his artistic beginnings.He was portrayed by artists of the Düsseldorf avant-garde who frequented his home, such as Otto Dix, who was also a tenant in one of his houses (The Family of the Painter A. T., 1923, Berlin, Neue Nationalgalerie), or by Karl Schwesig (The Trillhaase Couple, 1924). Trillhaase made his exhibition debut with the painting Crucifixion at the “Erste Internationale Kunstausstellung” organized by Adolf Uzarski in 1922 at the Tietz department store in Düsseldorf. After participating in further exhibitions until 1932, he was banned from painting by the National Socialists in 1933 as a “degenerate artist.” On May 12, 1936, he died unnoticed in Niederdollendorf.

== Œuvre ==
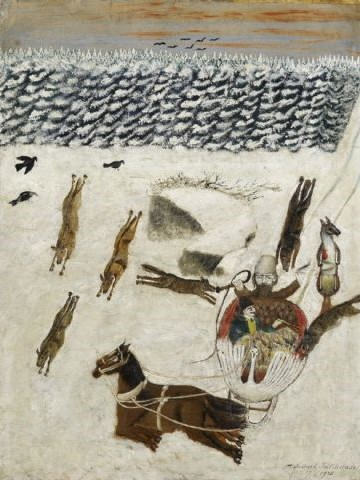
Adalbert Trillhaase: The Attack of The Wolves, 1923, Zander Collection, Cologne

Trillhaase often painted biblical scenes and left behind a large number of drawings. However, the total number of his works is small (approx. 75 paintings and 250 drawings).

His significance lies in the new way he depicted and composed his subjects. He translated his perception of religion into an independent visual world that is not idyllic or idealized, thus challenging the stereotype of so-called “naive art.”

His estate is not considered to be completely secure. His daughter Felicitas Haller, née Trillhaase (known as “Chichio,” 1894–1955), briefly married to the sculptor Hermann Haller, brought the paintings to Switzerland. Trillhaase's works can now be found, for example, in the Clemens Sels Museum in Neuss, in the Zander Collection in Cologne, and in Kolumba, the art museum of the Archdiocese of Cologne.

== Exhibitions (selection) ==
- 1925–1926: Große Kunstausstellung, Kunstpalast Düsseldorf
- 1929: Rheinische Sezession, Berliner Sezession
- 1930: Rheinische Sezession, Berliner Sezession
- 1932: Junge religiöse Kunst, Städtische Kunsthalle Düsseldorf
- 1949: Moderne Primitive Maler, Kunsthalle Bern
- 1952: Maler des einfältigen Herzens, Museum am Ostwall, Dortmund
- 1961: Das naive Bild der Welt, Kunsthalle Baden-Baden
- 1986: Adalbert Trillhaase 1858–1936. Retrospektive zum 50. Todestag, Clemens-Sels-Museum, Neuss
- 2013: Adalbert Trillhaase, Siebengebirgsmuseum, Königswinter
- 2015–2016: Der Schatten der Avantgarde. Rousseau und die vergessenen Meister, Museum Folkwang, Essen
- 2016: 27 Artists, 209 Works, Zander Collection, Bönnigheim
- 2024–2025: Artist at Work, Kolumba, Cologne

== Bibliography ==
- Zander, Susanne (2023). 26 Artists. Works from the Zander Collection. Cologne: Verlag der Buchhandlung Walther und Franz König.
- Juliane Roh: Adalbert Trillhaase. Aurel Bongers, Recklinghausen 1968.
- Manja Wilkens: Trillhaase, Adalbert. In: De Gruyter Allgemeines Künstler-Lexikon. Die bildenden Künstler aller Zeiten und Völker. Walter de Gruyter, Berlin 2010 ff., ISBN 978-3-598-23033-2, Band 110: Toroni–Tupynambá (2021), p. 272.
- Otto und Lise Bihalji-Merin, Ingrid Krause: Die Kunst der Naiven. Themen und Beziehungen. 1. Auflage. Haus der Kunst, München 1975, p. 82.
