= Ernst te Peerdt =

German painter (1852-1932)

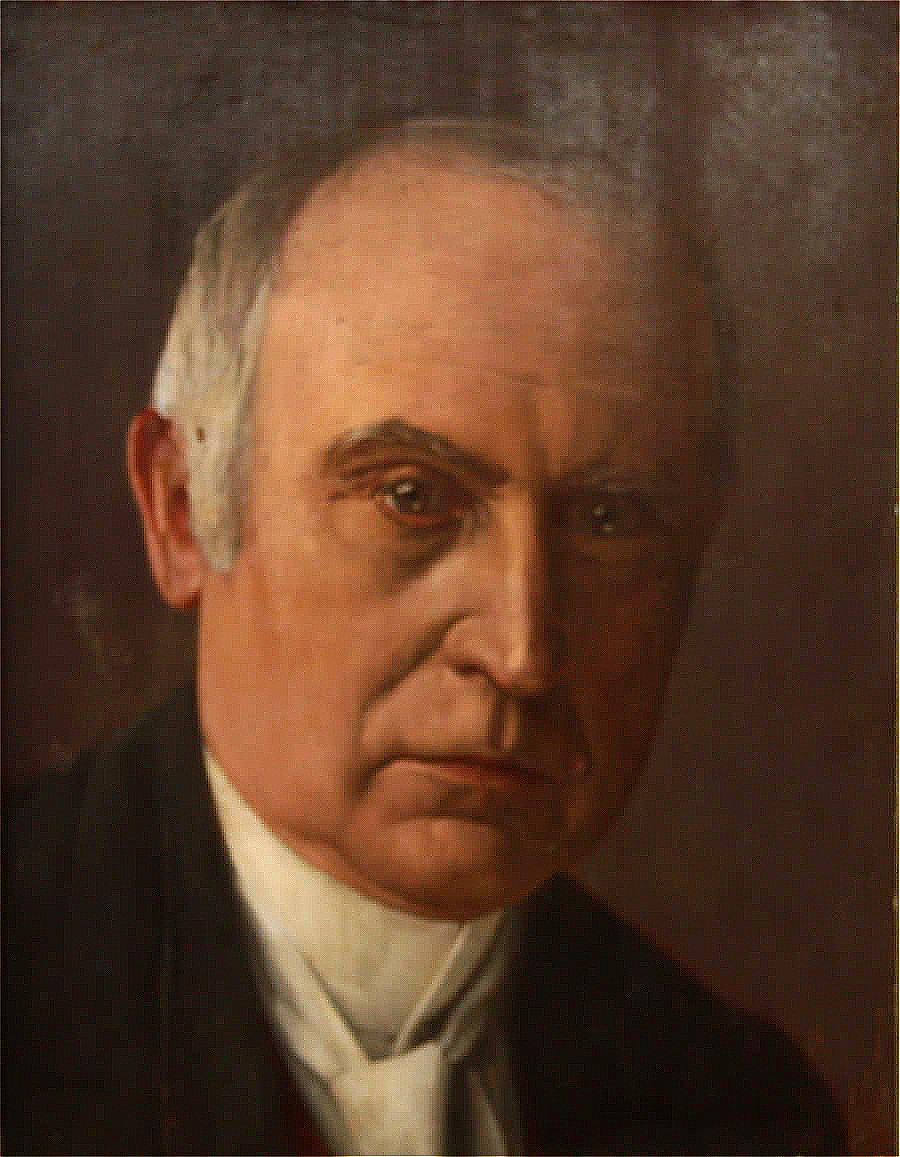
Self-portrait (date unknown)

Ernst Carl Friedrich te Peerdt (25 November 1852, Tecklenburg – 20 February 1932, Düsseldorf) was a German painter, associated with the Düsseldorfer Malerschule and the Münchner Schule.

== Life and work ==
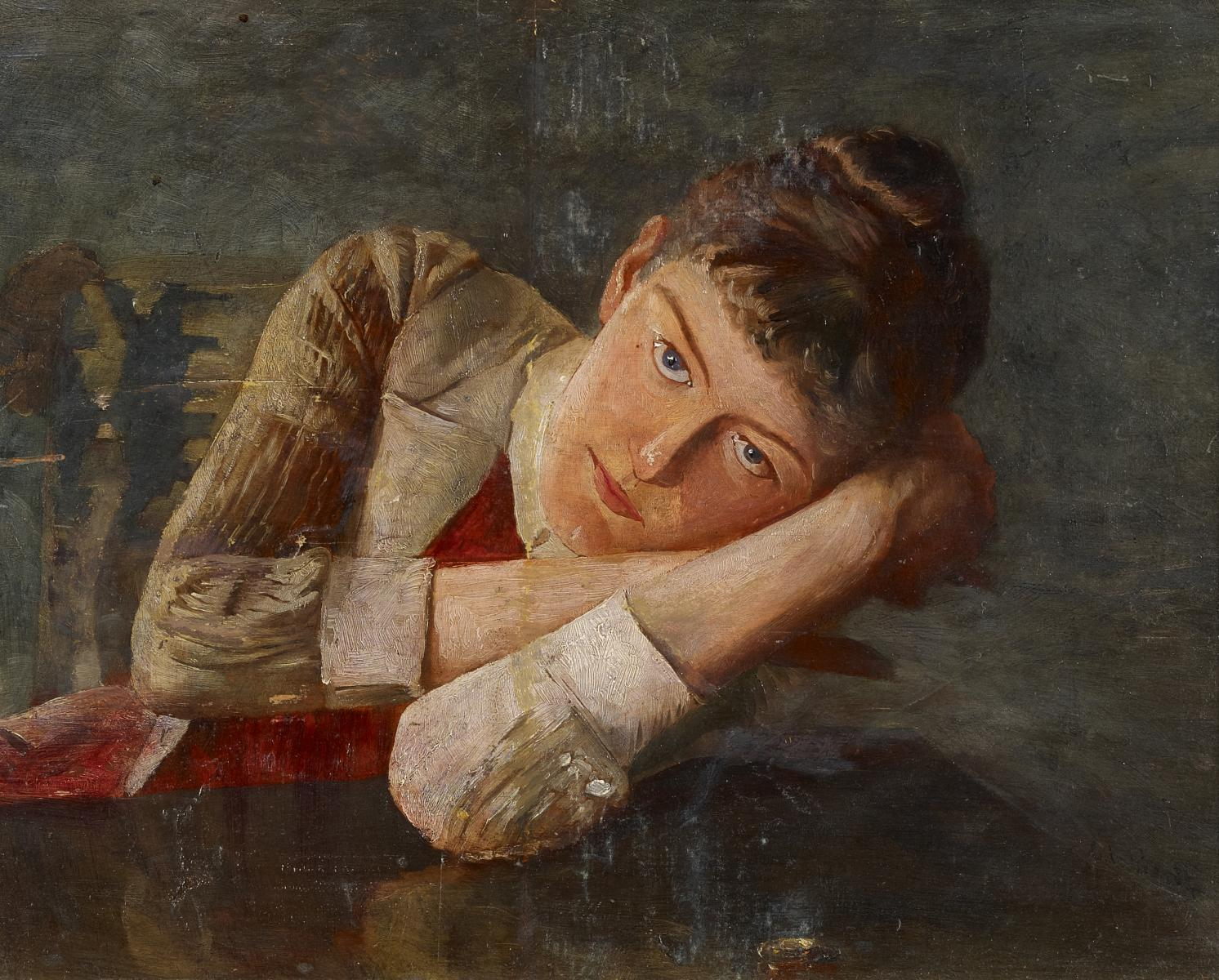
The Artist's Wife

He was born to a lower court judge, and grew up in Wesel, where he attended the local Gymnasium. Beginning in 1868, he studied at the Kunstakademie Düsseldorf, with Eduard Bendemann and Andreas Müller. In 1873, he transferred to the Academy of Fine Arts, Munich, where he studied with Wilhelm von Diez. He completed his studies in 1874, with Ludwig Knaus, at the Prussian Academy of Arts.

The years from 1878 to 1881 were spent travelling throughout Italy. Upon returning to Germany, he settled in Düsseldorf, and joined Malkasten, a progressive artists' association. He moved again in 1884; this time back to Munich. There, in 1888, he married Wilhelmine Baumgartner, from Burghausen. Their daughter, Johanna, was born in 1890. Two years later, they settled permanently in Düsseldorf, where their son, Heinrich, was born in 1895.

In 1909, he joined the Sonderbund, a society devoted to Impressionist art; participating in major exhibitions at the Alte Kunsthalle (1909) and the Kunstpalast (1910). In 1914, the art dealer, Alfred Flechtheim, organized and presented his first solo showing. That same year, Flechtheim was able to place some of his works at the Werkbund Exhibition. His second solo showing came at the Kölnischer Kunstverein in 1917. The following year, he was given the title "Professor" at the Kunstpalast. In 1919, he became one of the first members of the avant-garde artists' society, Young Rhineland.

In 1925, the University of Bonn awarded him an honorary doctorate. Two years later, the Kunstakademie Düsseldorf celebrated his 75th birthday by making him an honorary member. His last significant exhibition was in 1928. Shortly after his death, an obituary by the art historian, Walter Cohen, in Die Kunst für Alle described him as a "Painter-Poet-Philosopher". Later that same year, a memorial exhibition was held at the Kunstpalast.

In addition to his paintings, he wrote several books on art criticism, two dramas (Berufung, 1901 and Der Dichter und der Tod, 1906) and a work on philosophy (Das Ding an sich – das Ding als Funktion, 1927). He also published translations from Hindi, which included a short criticism of the Upanishads. His estate is held by the Heinrich Heine Institute.

== Selected paintings ==
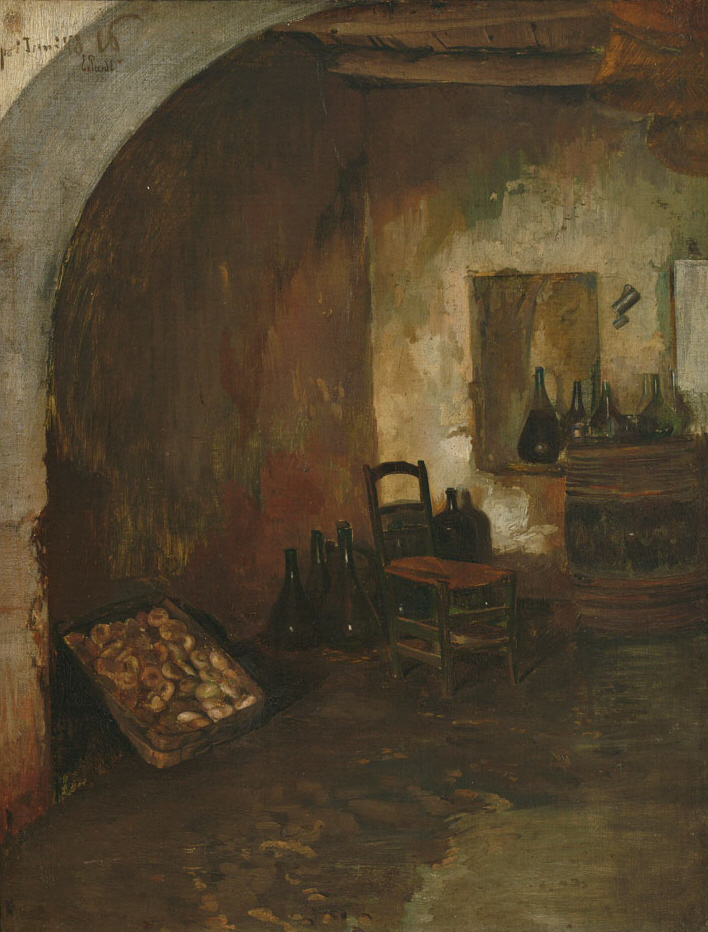
Storage Cellar

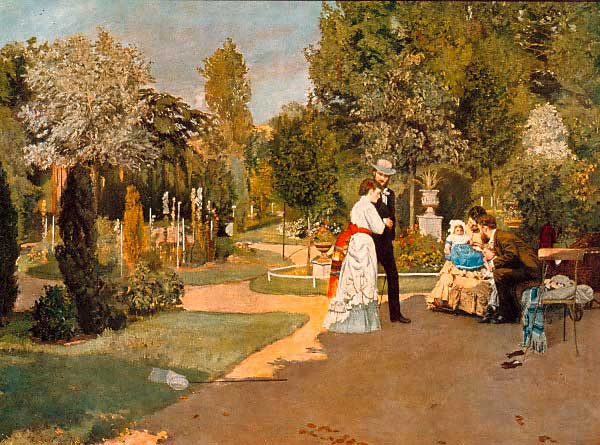
In the Park

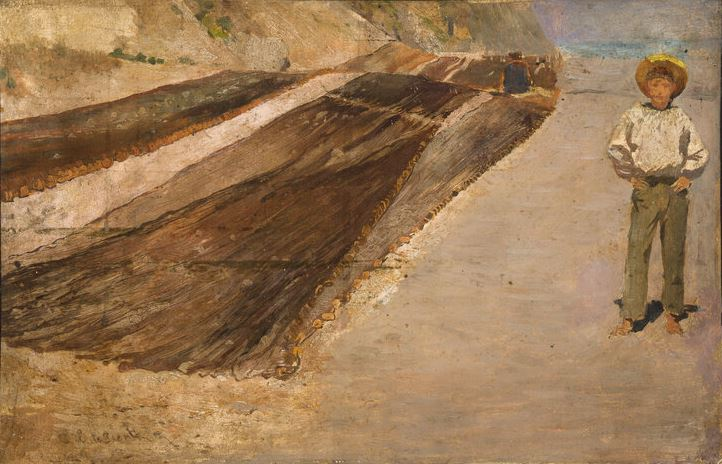
Huge Nets

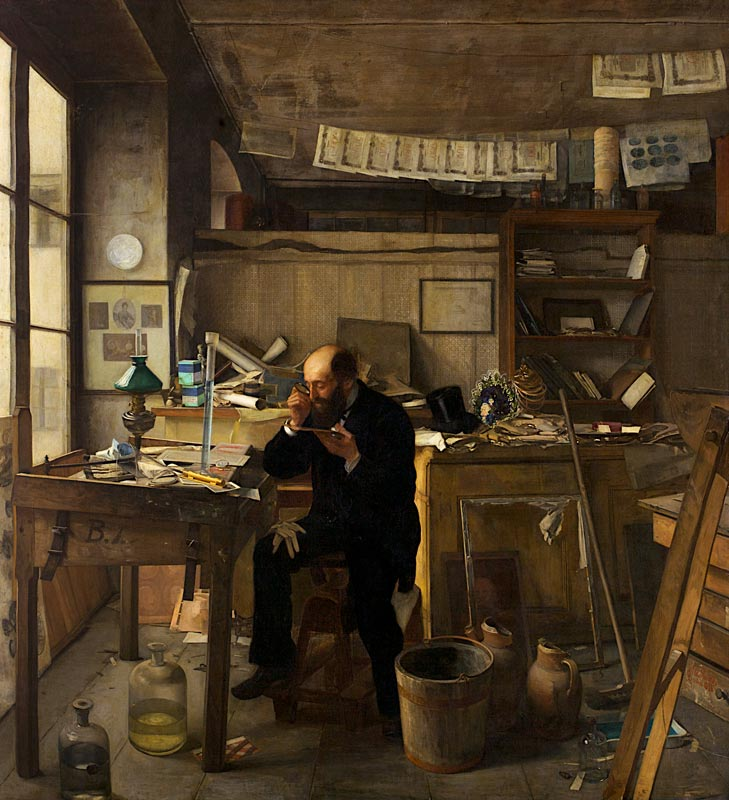
The Counterfeiter
