= Werner Heuser =

German painter (1880–1964)

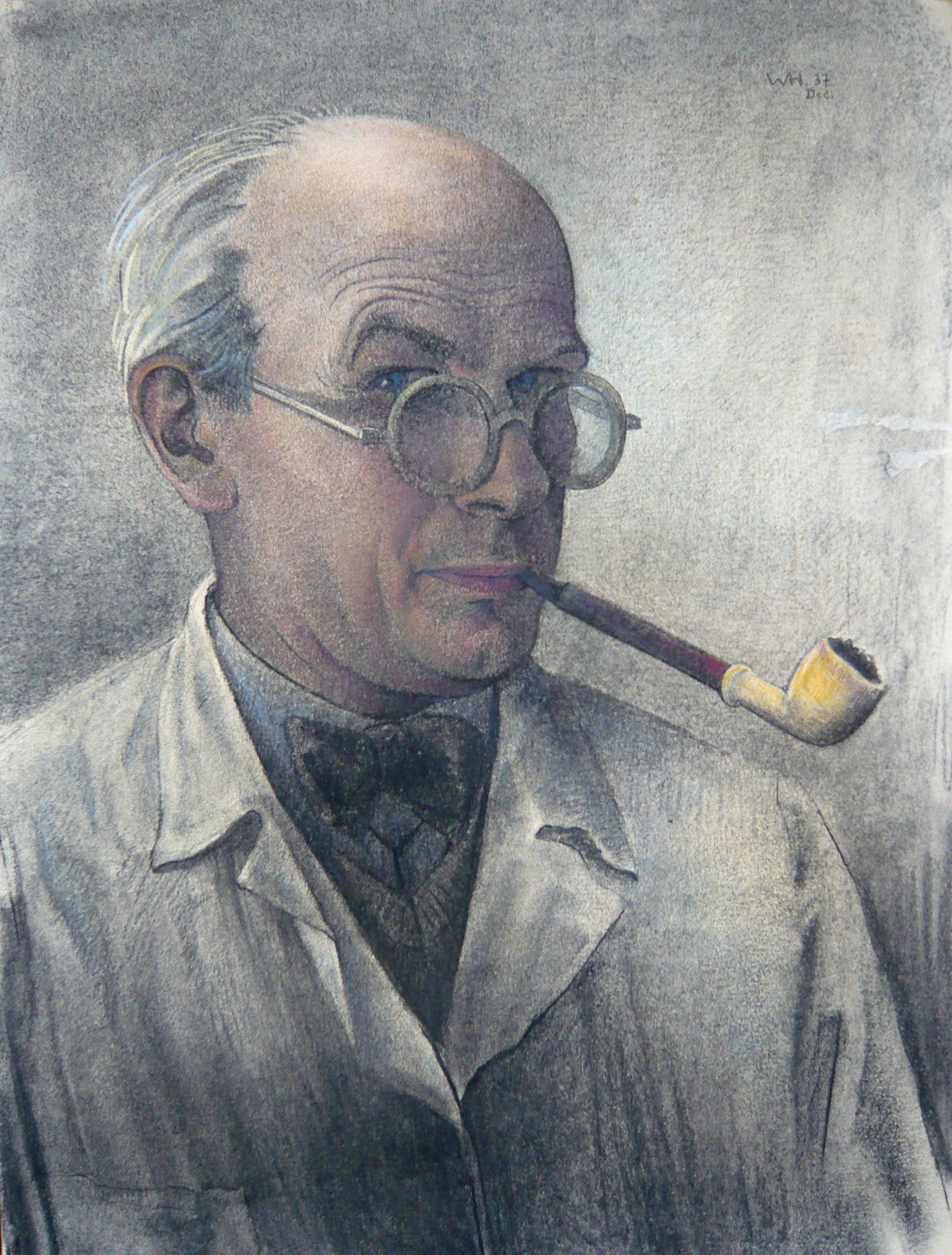
- Werner Heuser, self-portrait (1937)
- Born: 11 November 1880; Gummersbach, German Empire
- Died: 11 June 1964 (aged 83); Düsseldorf, West Germany
- Education: Kunstgewerbeschule, Kunstakademie Düsseldorf
- Spouse: Mira Sohn-Rethel Heuser
- Children: 2, including Ursula Benser
- Relatives: Alfred Sohn-Rethel (brother in-law), Otto Sohn-Rethel (brother in-law), Karli Sohn-Rethel (brother in-law)

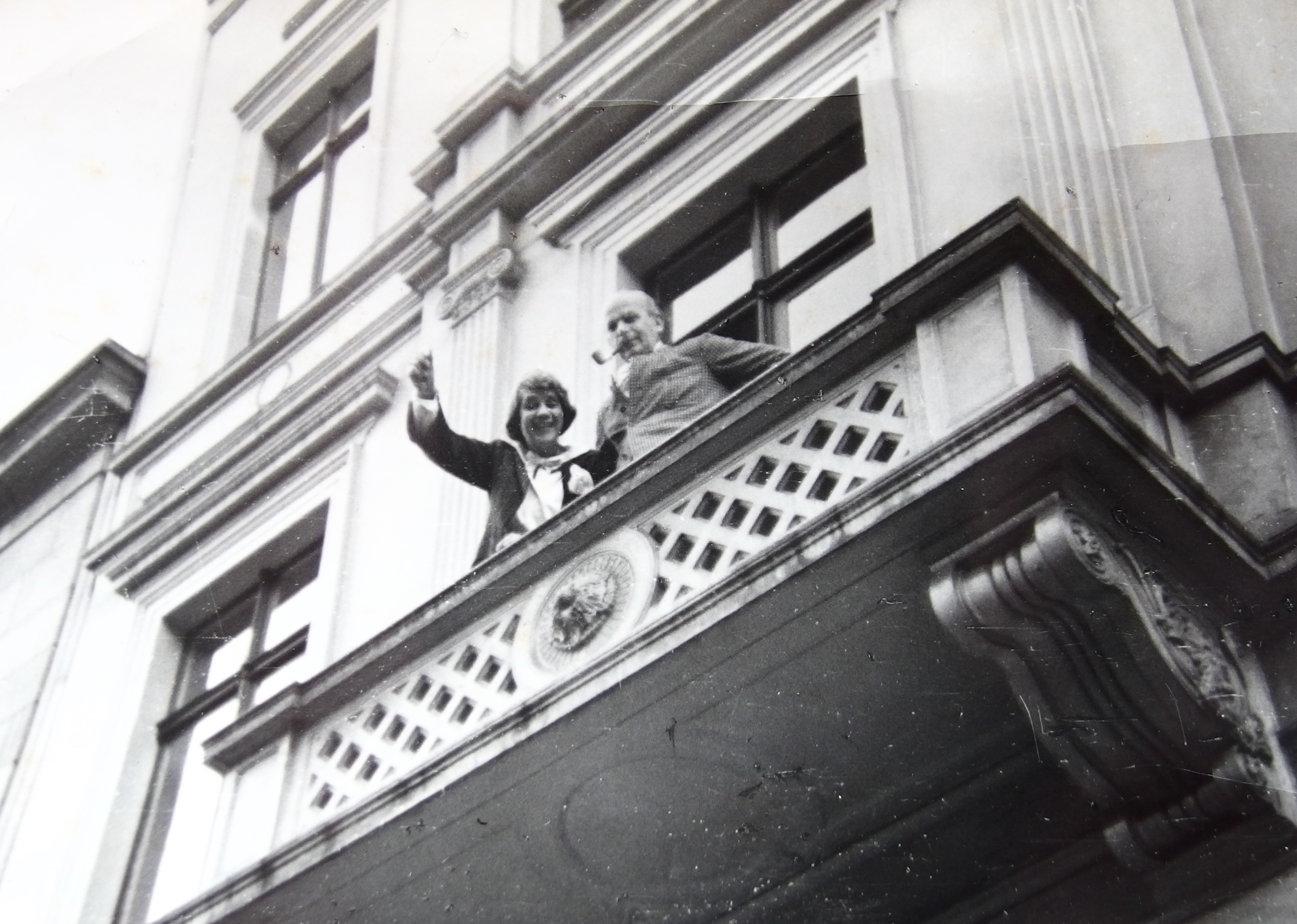
Werner and Mira (1938), waving from the Sohn-Rethel home on Goltsteinstraße 23 in Düsseldorf

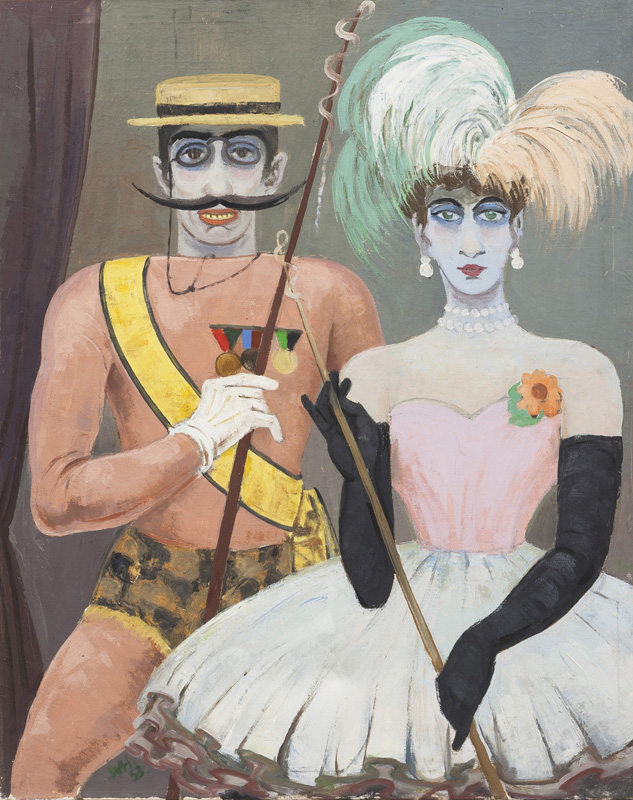
"Carneval" (1953)

Werner Heuser (11 November 1880 – 11 June 1964) was a German painter, engraver, drafter, and professor. He had been a professor of art at the Kunstakademie Düsseldorf (Düsseldorf Art Academy) from 1926 until 1937, and he was removed from his position by the National Socialists for being a "degenerate artist". After World War II, he rebuilt the academy, serving as the Director between 1946 until 1949.

== Early life and education ==
Werner Heuser was born 11 November 1880 in Gummersbach, Germany to Eugenie Hoestermann and Franz Eugen Heuser. His father was the editor of the New Braunfels Herald-Zeitung newspaper. When Heuser was one year old his father ran off with his neighbor's wife, emigrated to New Braunfels, Texas and changed his name to Eugen Kailer. As a result of family issues, Werner Heuser was sent to live with his paternal family in Bonn, Germany. He attended high school in Bonn and Siegburg.

He studied at Kunstgewerbeschule (School of Applied Arts) in Dresden and at Kunstakademie Düsseldorf (Düsseldorf Art Academy) with Peter Janssen, Adolf Maennchen, and Eduard Gerhardt.

On 11 October 1907 he married in Düsseldorf, to Mira Sohn-Rethel, the daughter of painter Karl Rudolf Sohn. Together they had two children, Klaus Heuser and Ursula Benser (née Heuser). Around 1907, Werner Heuser travelled to Rome and met up with his brother-in-laws Karli Sohn-Rethel, and Otto Sohn-Rethel, and artists Karl Hofer, Hermann Haller and Maurice Sterne.

== Career ==
In 1919, Heuser was one of the first members of the Young Rhineland (Das Junge Rheinland) artists' group, alongside Heinrich Nauen, Adolf Uzarski, Arthur Kaufmann, Carlo Mense, Walter Ophey, and architect Wilhelm Kreis.

In 1926, he was appointed to the Düsseldorf Art Academy, as a professor of drawing and composition. Some of his students included Herbert Zangs, Else Harney, Georg Meistermann, Caspar Walter Rauh, among others.

=== Entartete Kunst exhibit ===
Between 1927 until 1937, Germany was experienced a rise in Nazi Party power. In 1927, the National Socialist Society for German Culture was formed, in order to halt the "corruption of art" and inform the people about the relationship between race and art through pseudoscientific racist theories. Starting in 1933, the group labeled modern artwork and artists as "Jewish," "degenerate," and "Bolshevik".

In 1937, the Nazi officials purged German museums and removed the art they considered to be degenerate and formed a special exhibit of the work called, Entartete Kunst. Entartete Kunst featured 650 works of art and travelled throughout Germany, and was popular with viewers. Heuser was one of the artists in the exhibition and he was labeled as a "degenerate". That same year, 1937, Heuser's contract work as a professor was not extended.

=== World War II and post-war ===
During World War II he initially was staying in Sanary-sur-Mer, followed by a stay in Allgäu and Breisgau. In 1943, the Sohn-Rethel home at Goltsteinstraße 23 in Düsseldorf, where he lived and worked, was fire bombed destroying his art work and his art collection. He followed his family to Bollschweil by 1945. After the end of National Socialist rule, he returned to Düsseldorf and by 1 November 1945 he resumed teaching.

He was appointed as Director of the Düsseldorf Art Academy on 7 January 1946, and by 31 January 1946, the school was rebuilt and reopened.

== Death and legacy ==
Werner Heuser died of heart failure in Düsseldorf on 11 June 1964 and is buried at Nordfriedhof Düsseldorf cemetery.

His daughter Ursula Benser (1915–2001) was a painter, and she was married to photographer Walther Benser.

His work is included in various collections, including the Library of Congress.

== Exhibitions ==
- 1912 – Internationale Kunstausstellung des Sonderbundes Westdeutscher Kunstfreunde und Künstler (International art exhibition of the Sonderbund West German art lovers and artists), Cologne, Germany
- 1941 – Große Deutsche Kunstausstellung (Great German Art Exhibition), Munich, Germany
