= Johanna Ey =

German art dealer (1864–1947)

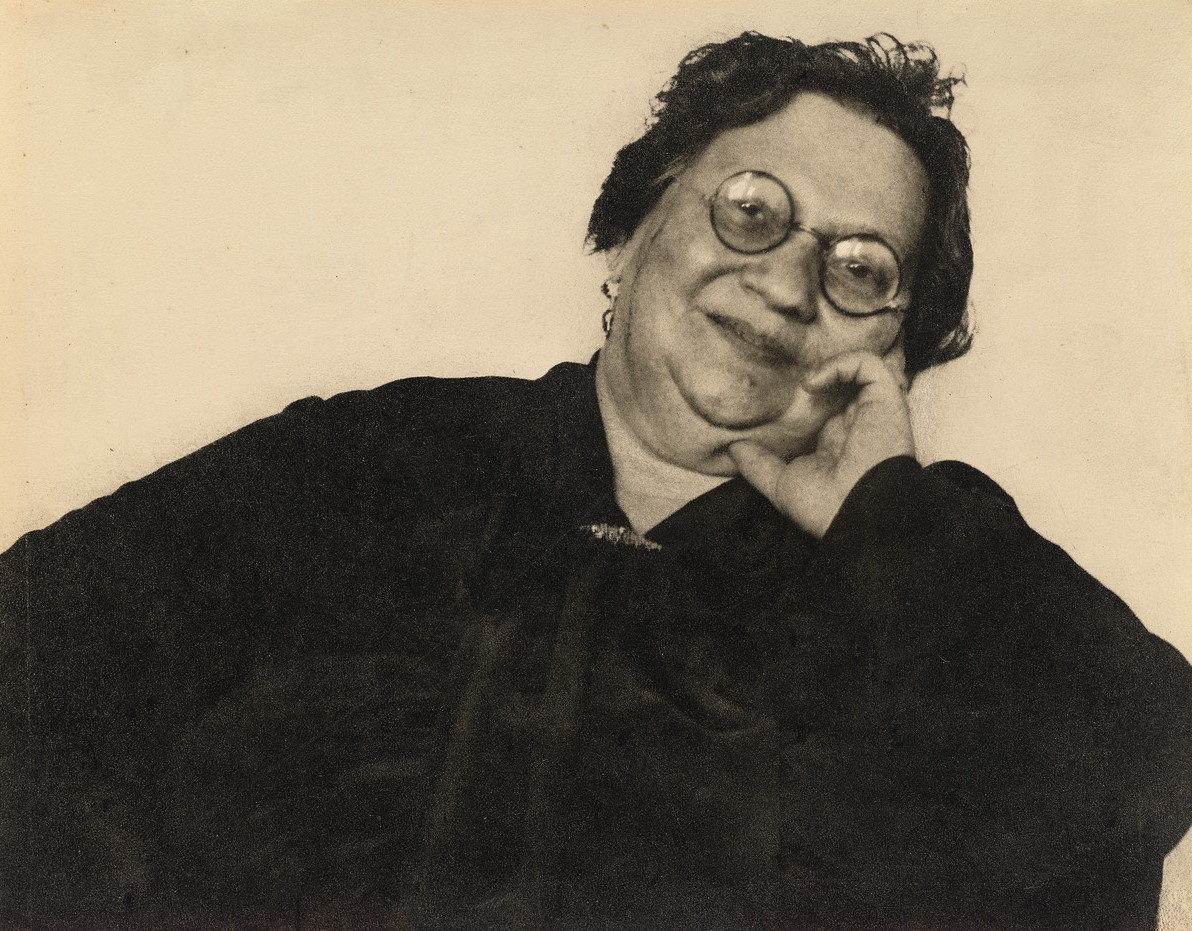
- Johanna Ey (photographer Hugo Erfurth)
- Born: March 4, 1864; Mönchengladbach, Kingdom of Prussia
- Died: August 27, 1947 (aged 83); Düsseldorf, West Germany
- Occupation: Art dealer

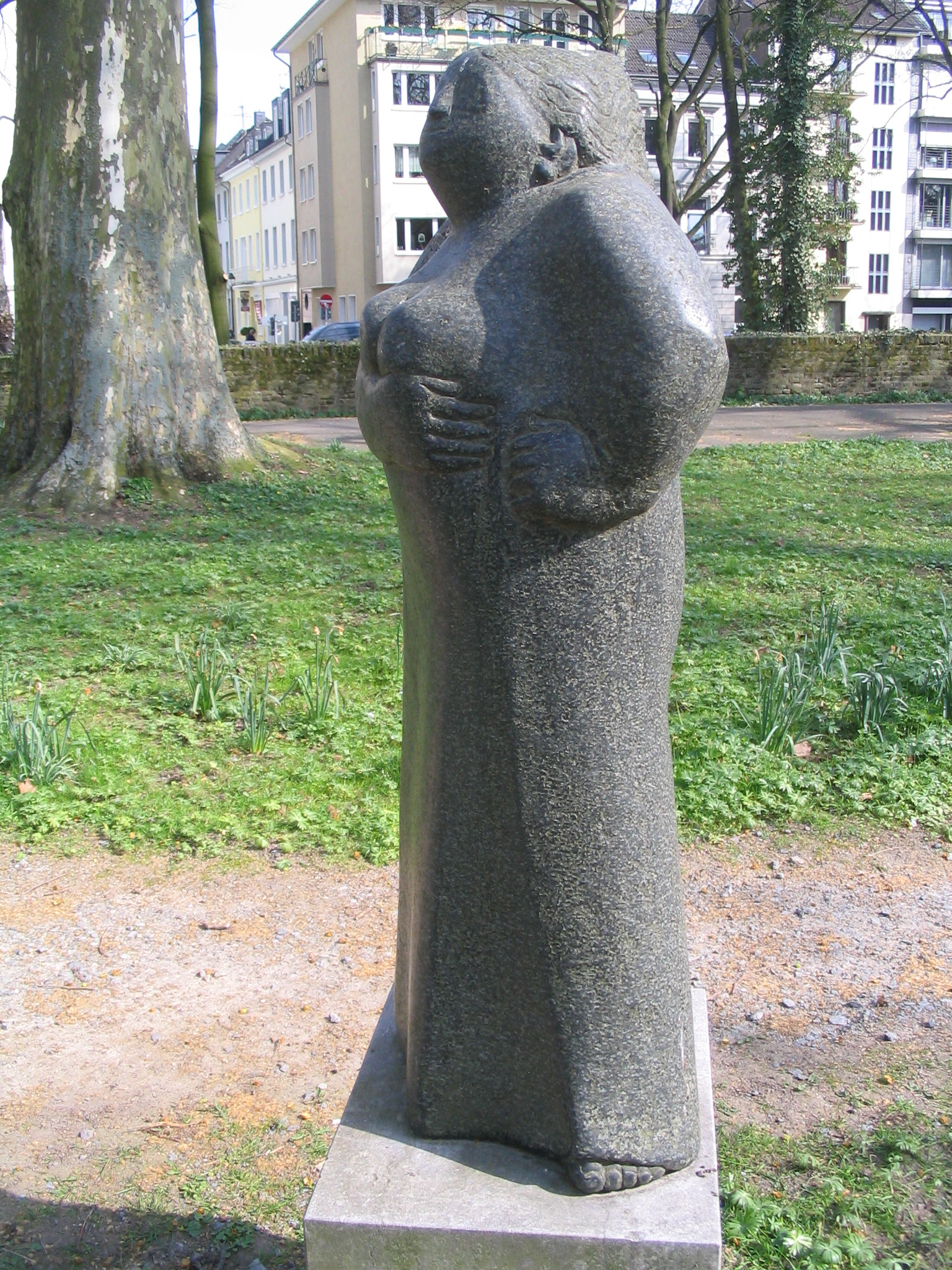
A sculpture of Johanna "Mutter" Ey by Hannelore Köhler stands in Düsseldorf's Spee'scher Park.

Johanna Ey (4 March 1864 – 27 August 1947) was a German art dealer during the 1920s. She became known as Mutter Ey (Mother Ey) for the nurturing support she provided to her artists, who included Max Ernst and Otto Dix.

== Biography ==
Ey was born in humble circumstances in Wickrath (today a quarter of Mönchengladbach). At the age of 19 she moved to Düsseldorf. She married and had twelve children, of whom eight died young. In 1910, middle aged and divorced, she opened a bakery in the proximity of the Düsseldorf Academy of Arts. This became a popular meeting place of actors, journalists, musicians and especially painters, who appreciated her policy of granting credit to artists and students. She displayed their works in her shop windows, and became a collector of art by accepting paintings as payment.

In 1916 she closed her café and opened a gallery on the Hindenburgwall (today Heinrich Heine avenue), where she showed works by academic painters. In the years following World War I, however, the gallery became the center of the artists of the "Junge Rheinland" (Young Rhineland) group. Ey initially decided to exhibit their art not for theoretical or economic reasons, but rather because of her personal friendships with the artists, although she quickly became an energetic proponent of modernism. Her support for her artists extended even to darning their socks, and she defended Wollheim and Dix when they were hauled into court on charges that their paintings were immoral.

During the 1920s, she was frequently painted by the artists in her circle, notably by Dix in 1924, and in 1925 by Arthur Kaufmann, who placed her at the center of his composition Contemporaries (Düsseldorf's Intellectual Scene). According to art historian Sergiusz Michalsky, "Johanna Ey's portrait was painted more often than that of any other woman in Germany."

With the rise to power of Hitler in 1933, nearly all the artists associated with Ey were denounced as degenerate artists; most were also political opponents of National Socialism. In April 1934 Johanna Ey gave up running her gallery. She died in Düsseldorf in 1947.

Among the artists associated with Ey's gallery were Max Ernst, Otto Dix, Otto Pankok, Gert Heinrich Wollheim, Ulrich Leman, Jean-Paul Schmitz, Adolf Uzarski, Arthur Kaufmann, Hermann Hundt, Adalbert Trillhaase, Karl Schwesig, Jankel Adler, Robert Pudlich, Franz Monjau, Adolf de Haer, and Curt Lahs.
