= Camille Cohen Jones =

American community leader (1884–1928)

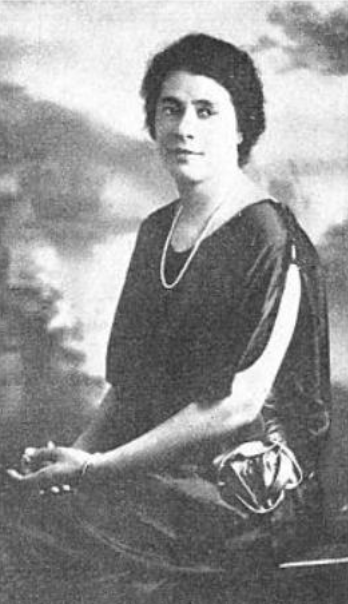
- Camille Cohen Jones, from a 1929 profile in The Crisis
- Born: Camille Marie Cohen; January 1, 1884; New Orleans, Louisiana, U.S.
- Died: October 17, 1928 (aged 44); Chicago, Illinois, U.S.
- Other name: Camille Cohen Bell
- Occupations: Community leader, clubwoman
- Known for: Founder, Louisiana Club of Chicago
- Father: Walter L. Cohen

Camille Marie Cohen Jones (January 1, 1884 – October 17, 1928), sometimes written Camille Cohen-Jones, was an American community leader active in national women's and political organizations, and was the founder and leader of the Louisiana Social and Beneficial Club, also known as the Louisiana Club of Chicago. The club connected and assisted fellow black Louisianans arriving in Chicago as part of the Great Migration.

== Early life and education ==
Cohen was born in New Orleans, the daughter of Walter L. Cohen and Wilhelmina Seldon Cohen. Her father, who was the Catholic son of a Jewish father and a Black mother, was an insurance executive and city official in New Orleans. She graduated from Straight University at age 18.

== Career ==
Cohen was a clerk and a school teacher as a young woman, and worked as her father's private secretary. After her second marriage, she taught music, sang on radio programs, and was active in Chicago politics. She was national chair of publicity for the National Association of Colored Women's Clubs and a member of the National Republican League of Women Voters. "Men should not have everything," she told an audience in 1924. "they certainly do not accomplish everything."

She corresponded frequently with W. E. B. Du Bois in the 1920s, about politics and events in Chicago. She was a contributing editor for the Associated Negro Press.

In 1926, Jones founded the Louisiana Social and Beneficial Club, a "home club" to connect and support fellow black Louisianans arriving in Chicago. The club held an annual Mardi Gras ball, processions, and other "spectacular and novel affairs", led by Jones. She was also active in the Gaudeamus Charity Club and the Friendly Big Sisters Club.

== Publications ==
- "An Interview with President Mary McLeod Bethune" (1926, California Eagle)
- "Your Cab Company" (1927, The Crisis)
- "Southeastern Federation of Colored Women's Clubs Ends Biennial at B'Ham June 8-12" (1927)

== Personal life ==
Camille Cohen married Alva Bell and had a daughter, Yolande; they divorced. She married Oscar D. Jones and moved to Chicago. She died in 1928, at the age of 44, at her daughter's home in Chicago. The cause of death was nephritis, and friends expressed concern that her illness was caused by a "some injurious reduction formula". Journalist Wendell Dabney recalled her as "magnificent in her womanhood—a dark Brunhilda, handsome, large, and free; full of joy and laughter, frank and fearless, never biting her tongue; and yet one who was never still, never dull, always going and doing and dreaming; always alive, always generous, loving and kind."
