= Herbert Eulenberg =

German poet and author

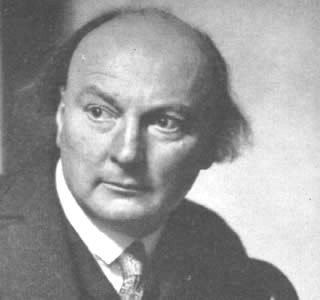
- Born: Max Herbert Eulenberg; 25 January 1876; Köln-Mülheim, German Empire
- Died: 4 September 1949 (aged 73); Düsseldorf, West Germany
- Occupations: Playwright, short story writer, essayist
- Writing career
- Period: 1896–1949
- Genres: Drama, Historical novel
- Notable works: Belinde, Schattenbilder
- Notable awards: Nationalpreis der DDR; 1949

Signature
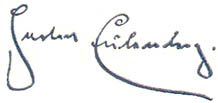

Max Herbert Eulenberg (25 January, 1876–4 September, 1949), was a German poet and author born in Cologne-Mülheim, Germany. He was married from 1904 to Hedda Eulenberg.

== Biography ==
=== 1920s ===
Eulenberg was the publisher of many books, for which he wrote the introductions. His speech on Schiller, which he wrote in 1909, generated heated debates. In 1911 he published Letter of a Father of our Times in the magazine PAN for which he was accused, tried and later acquitted of the charges of circulating obscene writing.

In the 1920s, he was one of the most performed playwrights on German stages. His essays on various subjects and topics on literature, theatre, music, and fine arts were published in numerous newspapers and magazines throughout Germany and Austria. He was awarded prizes and honours for his literary work such as “Der Preis des Frauenbundes zur Ehrung rheinischer Dichter”, the ”Volks-Schiller-Preis”, the “Preis of the Peter Wilhelm Müller Trust”, or the ”Wiener Volksschillerpreis”.

In 1919 Eulenberg, together with painters Arthur Kaufmann and Adolf Uzarski, founded the modern union of artists, “Das Junge Rheinland” in Düsseldorf. In May 1922 he was involved in organising the International Congress of Progressive Artists, at which he signed the "Founding Proclamation of the Union of Progressive International Artists".

In 1923 he lectured in the United States, where he was invited as the “first German after Einstein” to speak at Columbia University.

Eulenberg's "Ausgewählte Werke" (Selected Works) were published in 1925/26. In 1926, on the occasion of his 50th birthday, he was made honourable member of the “Rheinische Kunstakademie” in Düsseldorf. He was “sympathizer” of “Die Maler des Jungen Rheinlands”, the painters of the young Rhineland, and was in contact with personalities such as Hermann Hesse, Thomas Mann, Stefan Zweig, Hanns Heinz Ewers, Frank Wedekind, Gerhart Hauptmann, Lulu von Strauß und Torney, Felix Hollaender, Else Lasker-Schüler, Erich Mühsam, Peter Hille, John Henry Mackay, Herwarth Walden, Emil Ludwig, Franz Werfel, Wilhelm Schmidtbonn, and others.

=== 1930s and 1940s ===
During Nazi Germany, Eulenberg's dramas were banned, his books were no longer printed or sold. Yet, he stood firm against the threats of party members, who continuously denounced the pacifist and humanist as a “red-haired Jew”. If it had not been for his great fame he would have ended up in a Nazi concentration camp.

Eulenburg was a member of the Reich Chamber of Literature (part of the Reich Chamber of Culture).

During World War II, he published short articles under his pseudonyms “Siebenkäs”, “Lynkeus” or “Der lächelnde Zuschauer” in “Der Mittag”, a Düsseldorf daily newspaper. At the same time he wrote a multitude of dramas, in which he sharply attacked and disputed the current political situation.

After 1945 he was permanent contributor to the magazines “Aufbau” and “Die Weltbühne”. He received further prizes: 1948 the “Heinrich-Heine Prize” of the "Heinrich-Heine-Gesellschaft" at Hamburg for his biography of Heinrich Heine. In the cultural alliance for the democratic renewal of Germany he committed himself to the rebuilding of a cultural program for the bombed Düsseldorf. In 1948 he received an Honorary Doctorate from the University of Bonn. Eulenberg died in Düsseldorf-Kaiserswerth on September 4, 1949 of serious injuries after an accident. In 1949 he was posthumously awarded the Nationalpreis der DDR.

== Awards and honours ==
- 1913 Volks-Schillerpreis and Preis der Peter Wilhelm Müller-Stiftung
- 1919 Wiener Volkstheaterpreis
- 1946 He was given the freedom of the city of Düsseldorf
- 1948 Heinrich-Heine-Preis of the city of Hamburg
- 1949 Nationalpreis der DDR of the GDR

== Literary works ==
- Anna Walewska. Eine Tragödie in 5 Akten Berlin (1899)
- Münchhausen. Ein deutsches Schauspiel Berlin (1900)
- Leidenschaft. Trauerspiel in fünf Aufzügen Leipzig (1901)
- Ein halber Held. Tragödie in fünf Aufzügen Leipzig (1903)
- Kassandra. Ein Drama Berlin (1903)
- Du darfst ehebrechen! Eine moralische Geschichte. Allen guten Ehemännern gewidmet Berlin (1909)
- Alles um Liebe. Eine Komödie Leipzig (1910)
- Deutsche Sonette Leipzig (1910)
- Schattenbilder. Eine Fibel für Kulturbedürftige in Deutschland Berlin (1910)
- Sonderbare Geschichten Leipzig (1910)
- Brief eines Vaters unserer Zeit In: PAN 1. Jg., Nr. 11, 1. (April 1911) S. 358 - 363
- Die Kunst in unserer Zeit. Eine Trauerrede an die deutsche Nation Leipzig (1911)
- Alles um Geld. Ein Stück Leipzig (1911)
- Katinka die Fliege. Ein zeitgenössischer Roman Leipzig (1911)
- Ikarus und Daedalus. Ein Oratorium Leipzig (1912)
- Neue Bilder (1912)
- Belinde. Ein Liebesstück in fünf Aufzügen Leipzig (1913)
- Der Frauentausch. Ein Spiel in fünf Aufzügen Leipzig (1914)
- Zeitwende. Ein Schauspiel in fünf Akten Leipzig (1914)
- Der Morgen nach Kunersdorf. Ein vaterländisches Stückchen Leipzig (1914)
- Letzte Bilder Berlin (1915)
- Das Ende der Marienburg. Ein Akt aus der Geschichte Stuttgart (1918)
- Der Bankrott Europas. Erzählungen aus unserer Zeit (1919)
- Mein Leben für die Bühne Berlin (1919)
- Anna Boleyn Berlin (1920)
- Der Übergang. Eine Tragödie München (1920)
- Das grüne Haus. Ein Schauspiel (1921)
- Der Mückentanz. Ein Spiel Stuttgart (1922)
- Liebesgeschichten Leipzig (1922)
- Mückentanz. Ein Spiel Stuttgart (1922)
- Wir Zugvögel. Roman Stuttgart (1923)
- Erscheinungen Stuttgart (1923)
- Die Familie Feuerbach. In Bildnissen Stuttgart (1924)
- Bühnenbilder Berlin (1924)
- Ausgewählte Werke in 5 Bänden. Bd. 1: Lyrische und dramatische Dichtungen Stuttgart (1925)
- Ausgewählte Werke in 5 Bänden. Bd. 2: Dramen aus der Jugendzeit ebd.
- Ausgewählte Werke in 5 Bänden. Bd. 3: Dramen aus dem Mannesalter ebd.
- Ausgewählte Werke in 5 Bänden. Bd. 4: Schattenbilder und Lichtbilder ebd
- Ausgewählte Werke in 5 Bänden. Bd. 5: Erzählende Werke ebd
- Mensch und Meteor Dresden (1925)
- Schattenbilder und Lichtbilder Stuttgart (1926)
- Ein rheinisches Dichterleben Bonn & Berlin (1927)
- Um den Rhein Berlin (1927)
- Glückliche Frauen Hellerau (1929)
- Die letzten Wittelsbacher Wien (1929)
- Die Windmühle Hamburg (1929)
- Das Marienbild in: Neue deutsche Erzähler Bd. 1 (Max Brod u.a.) Paul Franke, Berlin o. J. (1930)
- Das Buch vom Rheinland München (1931)
- Glaube, Liebe, Hoffnung Berlin (1942)
- Nachsommer. Berlin (1942)
- Die Prä-Raphaeliten Düsseldorf (1946)
- Freundesworte in: Leo Statz: Der Sillbund Drei Eulen, Düsseldorf (1946) S. 11 - 20 (Nachruf auf den von den Nazis ermordeten Statz)
- Heinrich Heine Berlin (1947)
- Meister der Frühe Düsseldorf (1947)
- So war mein Leben Düsseldorf (1948)
- Europa. Ein Hirtenstück aus der griechischen Sagenwelt (zwischen 1940 und 1944) Düsseldorf (1949)
- Schattenbilder. 20 Musikerportraits Düsseldorf & Wien (1965)

== Literature ==
- Johann Gottfried Hagens: Herbert Eulenberg. Berlin: Börngräber (1910). (= Der moderne Dichter; 4)
- Peter Hamecher: Herbert Eulenberg. Ein Orientierungsversuch. Leipzig: Rowohlt (1911).
- Oskar Maurus Fontana: Die Dramatiker des Rheinlandes. Herbert Eulenberg und Wilhelm Schmidtbonn. Augsburg: Filser (1921).
- Rudi vom Endt: Der Dichter Eulenberg, ganz menschlich gesehen. Wuppertal-Elberfeld: Putty (1946).
- Hedda Eulenberg: Im Doppelglück von Kunst und Leben. Düsseldorf: Die Faehre (1952).
- Otto Brües: Herbert Eulenberg. Ansprache zu seinem Gedächtnis an seinem 80. Geburtstag am 25. January 1956 in der Staatlichen Kunstakademie. Düsseldorf: Gesellschaft von Freunden und Förderern der Staatl. Kunstakademie (1956).
- Helgard Bruhns: Herbert Eulenberg. Drama, Dramatik, Wirkung. Frankfurt am Main: Akad. Verl.-Ges. (1974). ISBN 3-7997-0239-3
- Michael Matzigkeit: Herbert Eulenberg - "Siebenkäs", eine Opposition im Verborgenen. In: Musik, Theater, Literatur und Film zur Zeit des Dritten Reiches. Düsseldorf (1987), S. 89–95.
- Michael Matzigkeit: Herbert Eulenberg - Der Prototyp des "rheinischen" Autors. In: Ders., Literatur im Aufbruch. Schriftsteller und Theater in Düsseldorf 1900 - 1933. Düsseldorf: Verl. d. Goethe-Buchh., (1990), S. 57 - 82; 214 - 221. ISBN 3-924331-23-5
- Frank Thissen: "Edle Arznei für den Alltag". Herbert Eulenbergs Düsseldorfer Morgenfeiern und die Romantikrezeption um 1990. Köln u.a.: Böhlau (1992). (= Böhlau forum litterarum; 16) ISBN 3-412-06691-5 (can be demanded as PDF [1] by the author.)
- Bernd Kortländer: Rheinischer Internationalismus am Beispiel Herbert Eulenbergs. In: Literarische Fundstücke, hrsg. v. Ariane Neuhaus-Koch u. Gertrude Cepl-Kaufmann. Heidelberg: Winter (2002). (= Beiträge zur neueren Literaturgeschichte; 188). S. 256–274. ISBN 3-8253-1303-4
- Joseph A. Kruse: Der Schriftsteller Herbert Eulenberg (1876–1949). Ein "Ehrenbürger der Welt" aus Kaiserswerth am Rhein. In: Geschichte im Westen. 18 (2003) S. 116–128.
- Sabine Brenner: "Heinrich Heine hat mich gebeten, in seinem Namen folgendes zu erklären". Der ’rheinische’ Dichter Herbert Eulenberg und sein literarisches Vorbild Heinrich Heine. In: "... und die Welt ist so lieblich verworren", hrsg. v. Bernd Kortländer. Bielefeld: Aisthesis (2004). ISBN 3-89528-465-3
