= Kasia von Szadurska =

German illustrator and painter (1886–1942)

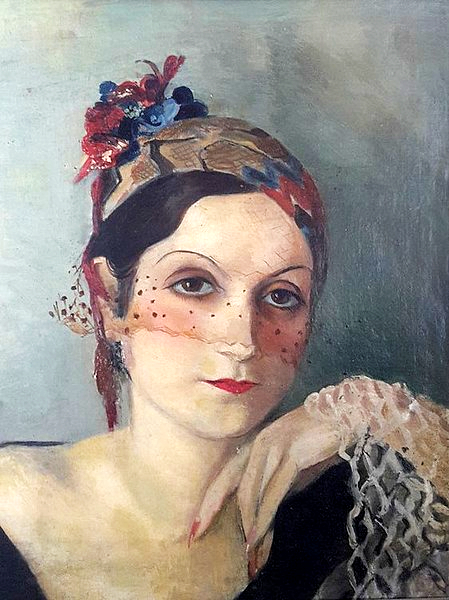
Self-portrait (1920s)

Margarethe Casimirowna Schadursky-Sternberg, known as Kasia von Szadurska (23 February 1886, Moscow - 3 April 1942, Berlin) was a German Expressionist painter, illustrator, and graphic artist.

== Life and work ==
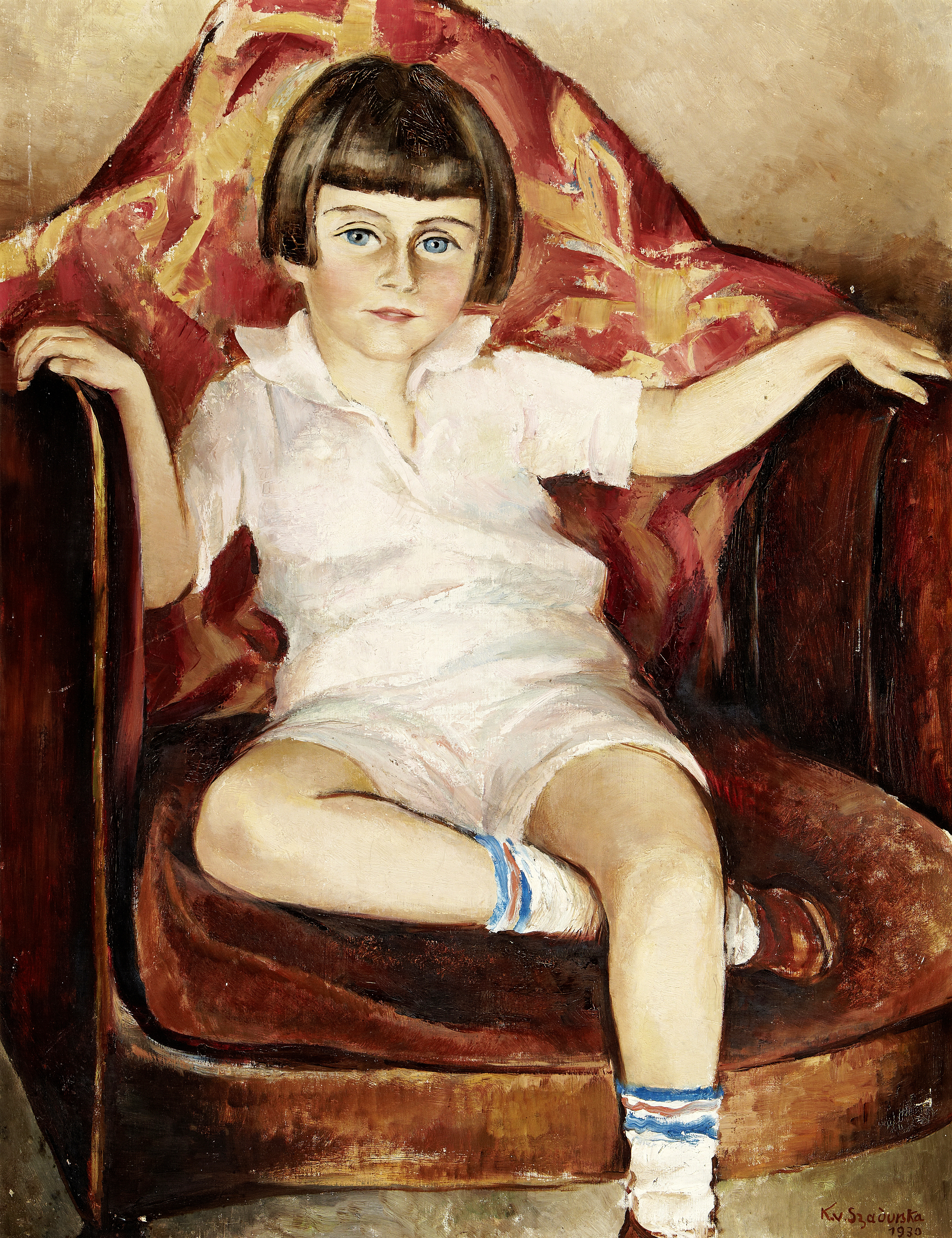
Portrait of a Boy

She came to Germany at the age of four, as the adoptive child of a family named Sternberg, near Dresden. In 1903 she went to Düsseldorf, where she spent a year and a half taking drawing lessons from Willy Spatz. In 1905, her family moved to Hamburg. There, she took lessons from Carl Rotte, and developed a preference for portraits. In 1907, she left her family and moved to Munich, where she became a student at the "Ladies' Academy" of the Münchner Künstlerinnenverein (Women Artists' Association).

Shortly after her arrival, she met a law student; Otto Ehinger from Meersburg. In 1910, after his graduation, they were married in Niedergrund, a resort town in "Bohemian Switzerland". Although his degree was in law, he earned his living as a publicist and travel journalist. In 1914, he moved to Meersburg to avoid military service. Kasia settled nearby in Konstanz, where she was engaged in making postcards. He apparently had to keep their marriage a secret.

After his mother-in-law's death in 1916, Ehinger took over his family's brewery business. Later, he became involved in politics. A minor scandal occurred when his opponents noticed that he went to Konstanz every weekend, and his secret was revealed. As a result, in 1919, he was forced to give up his candidacy for a seat in the Landtag. They continued living apart until 1922, when she moved to Meersburg and opened a studio. They were divorced in 1935. Although the reasons for the divorce were probably numerous, the blame was put on her, for having an alleged affair with a local artist named Johannes Kutscher. The custody of their two teenage sons was awarded to Ehinger.

A year before the divorce, she had returned to Konstanz and, once again, began producing portraits. With the rise of National Socialism, she was unable to sell her works publicly, and was entirely dependent on private commissions. During the course of the "Entartete Kunst" (Degenerate Art) campaign, some of her works were removed from the Städtischen Wessenberg-Galerie, which had purchased them in 1929. These included portrait studies of the dancer, Tatjana Barbakoff, who would die at Auschwitz. Most of them were returned a year later.

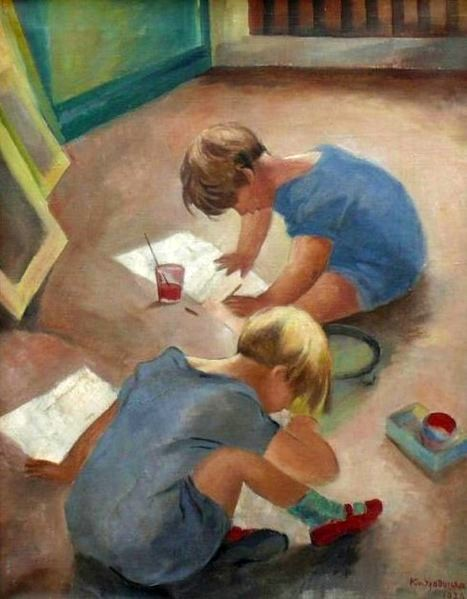
Children at Play

Toward the end of 1937, her clientele shifted to Berlin, making it necessary to travel back and forth frequently. In 1940, following an exhibition with the Verein der Berliner Künstlerinnen, she decided to live there; settling in the Wilmersdorf district. By then, her health had already begun to decline. Medical records from her estate indicate that a breast amputation was performed. At the beginning of 1942, she was hospitalized, and died a few months later, aged fifty-six.
