= Caspar Walter Rauh =

German draughtsperson (1912–1983)

Caspar Walter Rauh (13 October 1912 in Würzburg – 7 October 1983 in Kulmbach) was a German graphic artist, illustrator and painter during the post-war period. He was part of the art movement known as Fantastic Realism.

== Life ==
Rauh's father was a civil servant, and his mother came from a family of farm labourers. After the family moved to the town of Bayreuth he attended the Gymnasium (academic secondary school) there from 1923 on. In 1926 he joined the “Wandervogel” youth movement. Graduating from school in 1931, he began his studies at the art academy in Düsseldorf in 1932, attending lectures by Werner Heuser and Heinrich Nauen. Rauh was an enthusiastic admirer of the works of Alfred Kubin, Masereel and Cézanne. During the years 1934/35 he spent some months in Amsterdam, meeting former students of Paul Klee and Bauhaus. In 1936 he continued his studies at the academy in Leipzig under the supervision of Walter Tiemann. The following year he moved to Berlin, where he worked as a freelance artist and was employed by an advertising agency. He had his first exhibition at the Berlin gallery Zintl in 1939.

In the same year, immediately after his marriage, he was conscripted and sent to the Polish front as an infantryman. During the war his skills as a cartographer were discovered; he was deployed in France and Russia, and was briefly imprisoned at the end of the war. His family had been evacuated to the small Franconian village of Himmelkron during the war, and Rauh lived there with them under financially constrained circumstances from 1945 to 1955. To make ends meet, Rauh would sketch the houses of villagers, who often paid in natural produce for the drawings. In 1955 he moved to Kulmbach with his wife and two children, and lived there until his death in 1983.

From 1958 onwards, Rauh was a member of Fantasmagie, a Belgian-based movement to which representatives of Fantastic Realism from all over Europe subscribed. He regularly participated in exhibitions held by this and other groups, and eventually mounted a public exhibition devoted exclusively to his work. Caspar Walter Rauh died in Kulmbach on 7 October 1983.

== Work ==
=== Ink drawings and engravings ===
Already during the war, Rauh was working on ink drawings in small formats which drew on a repertoire of phantasmagorical images rich in symbols. The shock and terror of the war was a point of departure for Rauh's artistic productions during the post-war period. In 1947 he published a folder with 16 ink drawings. Shortly afterwards the volume Niemandsland (No Man's Land) was published in a subsidised print run of 10,000 copies. It contains 48 ink drawings accompanied by 48 short but distinctive texts. Its imagery – inspired by surrealism and phantasmagorical drawing – depicts the war as an apocalypse that has created a no man's land within which humanist values have been marginalised.

More or less simultaneously, Rauh was working on a second project entitled Traumland (Dreamland), but this volume was not published until 1993, when it was released as part of his bequest. In contrast to Niemandsland the ink drawings in Traumland are coloured throughout and the imagery leans more strongly towards the humorous, idyllic and bizarre. Rauh himself describes it as an attempt to “soar above misery while dreaming and construct a world in its own right – a magic garden”. The differences between the two collections illustrate a tension that goes right through Rauh's later works: between the unstinting illustration of barbarity and destruction on the one hand, and the quest for fantastic imagination, irony and burlesque on the other hand.

After a short engagement with abstraction during the fifties, in which he chiefly worked in mixed media, Rauh returned to Fantastic Realism with its potential for humour and revulsion. Although he increasingly worked in larger formats, the main focus of his artistic production was still on small formats – ink drawings and above all engravings. From 1958 onwards he regularly produced folders of hand-produced etchings printed and sold by Rauh himself.

=== Watercolours ===
Watercolours (also involving ink draughtsmanship) constituted an important second sphere of activity which, while present since the fifties, intensified after 1970. The watercolours are chiefly depicting landscapes, but run the gamut from “real” landscape drawing to imaginative scenarios exploiting surreal figurations.

=== Book Illustrations ===
Illustrations of literary works opened up a third line of activity for Rauh. His marked preference for the classics of fantastic literature is recognisable in his illustrations of works and productions written by Edgar Allan Poe, Jean Paul and E.T.A. Hoffmann. In addition, Rauh worked as an illustrator of children's books, providing ink drawings for the German edition of three novels in Mary Norton’s series The Borrowers. In addition, he produced numerous works based on motifs taken from the fairy tales of the Grimm brothers and others.

=== Rauh as author: fairy tales ===
Rauh's interest in fairy tales is also documented by his own literary productions. Between 1950 and 1955 he wrote 33 short fairy tales which were broadcast by Bayerischer Rundfunk (Bavarian Radio) and published in German daily newspapers.

=== "Kunst am Bau" ===
It was initially in order to provide a financial income for his family that Rauh accepted a number of commissions involving the composition of large-scale glass mosaics for building projects. Examples of this work can mainly be seen in the region of Upper Franconia. A well-known example can be seen on an electric transformer in Kulmbach – the “Transformatorenhäuschen” depicts the animals of the African savannah. However, in his brief autobiographical sketch Curriculum Vitae, Rauh described these commissioned works as “unsatisfactory".

=== The C.W. Rauh bequest ===
The C.W Rauh bequest, comprising a significant collection of Rauh's drawings, engravings and paintings as well as his entire studio materials, is on permanent loan to the Oberfrankenstiftung (Culture Foundation of Upper Franconia) and is housed at the art museum (Kunstmuseum) in Bayreuth.

== Literature ==
- Hans-Walter Schmidt-Hannisa (ed.): Caspar Walter Rauh. Schwierige Verzauberung. Katalog zur Ausstellung in der Petrikirche Kulmbach 2005. Kulmbach 2005.
- Marina von Assel (ed.): Caspar Walter Rauh. Märchenhaftes. Geschichten und Bilder. Bayreuth 2006.
- Wolfram Benda (ed.): Traumbilder – Bilderträume: Alfred Kubin, Caspar Walter Rauh, Stephan Klenner-Otto. Drei Generationen phantastischer Kunst. Hannover 2009.
- Hans-Walter Schmidt-Hannisa (ed.): Zeitzeuge und Phantast. Zum Werk Caspar Walter Rauhs. Hannover 2011.
