= Otto Pankok =

German artist (1893–1966)

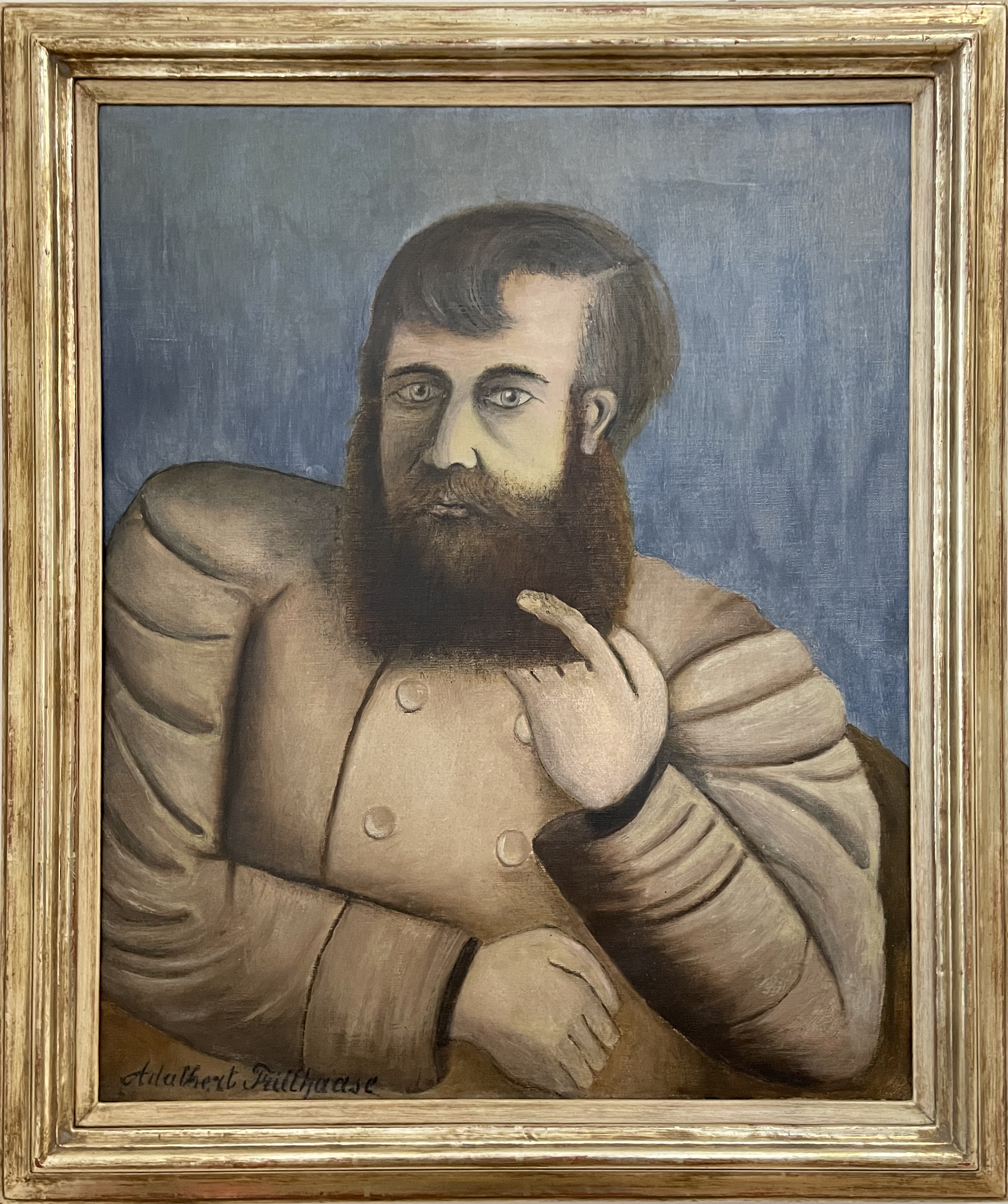
- Portrait of Otto Pankok, by Adalbert Trillhaase
- Born: 6 June 1893; Mülheim
- Died: 10 October 1966 (aged 73)
- Known for: Painting, printmaking and sculpture

Otto Pankok (6 June 1893 – 10 October 1966) was a German painter, printmaker, and sculptor.

== Biography ==
Pankok was born in Mülheim on the Ruhr. In 1912 he began his formal training as an artist at the Art Academies in Düsseldorf and Weimar. After only a few months he left the Weimar Academy, where his teachers were Fritz Mackensen and Albin Egger-Lienz, and went on a study trip to the Netherlands with Werner Gilles. Afterwards (1914), he spent two months in Paris, where he attended the Académie russe and the Académie de la Grande Chaumière. Between 1914 and 1917 he was a soldier in France in World War I.

Returning to Düsseldorf in 1919, he was a founder of the "Junge Rheinland" (Young Rhineland) group. With Otto Dix, Gert Heinrich Wollheim, and Adolf Uzarski, among others, he was one of the painters championed by the art dealer Johanna Ey. In 1921 he married the journalist Hulda Droste and their daughter Eva was born in 1925.

When Hitler came to power in 1933, Pankok was declared a degenerate artist. Subsequently, 56 of his pictures were seized from museums, some of which were included in the infamous exhibition Entartete Kunst (Degenerate Art), mounted by the Nazis in Munich in 1937.

Following the war (from 1947 to 1958) he was a professor at the Academy of Fine Arts in Düsseldorf, where Günter Grass, Gotthard Graubner and Günther Uecker were among his students.

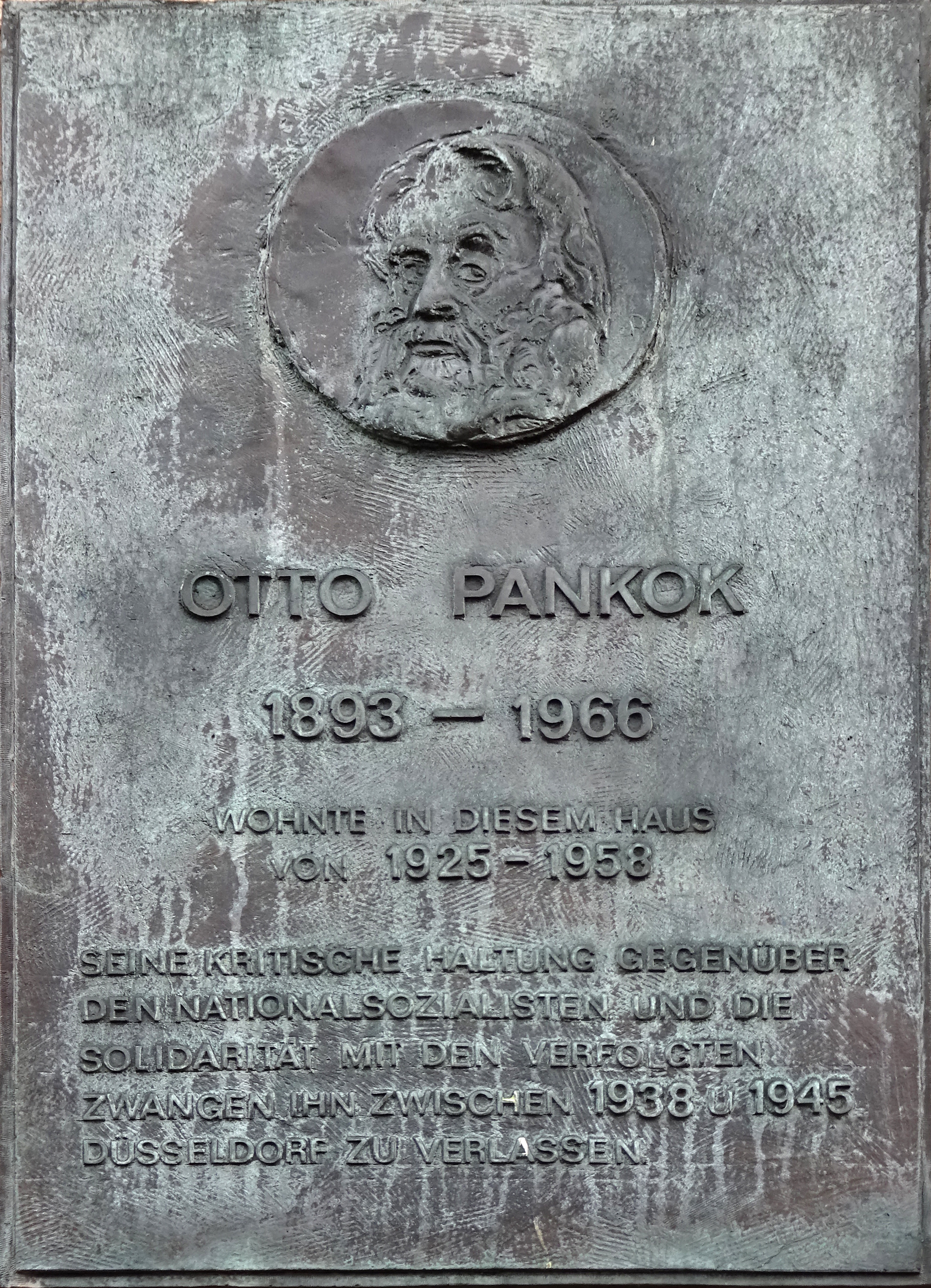
Memorial plaque at Otto Pankok's house in Düsseldorf-Oberkassel

After retirement, he moved to Haus Esselt in Drevenack, where after his death a selection from his work with archive was set up in a museum showing. Except in the years of the Nazi regime, Pankok traveled extensively and painted on his journeys. He died in Wesel.

== Work ==
Pankok's works are typically large monochrome paintings. He also created an extensive body of graphic work, notably woodcuts and monotypes. Pankok's pictures show humans, animals and landscapes, realistically and expressively, often depicting people at the edge of society. Pankok also created over 200 (mostly small scale) bronze sculptures. From 1924 to 1933 Pankok regularly contributed portrait drawings to the Düsseldorf daily newspaper "Der Mittag".

Particularly notable are the pictures of Roma and Sinti he had befriended in the late 1920s in Düsseldorf. They also modelled for him during 1931 to 1934 for a series of 60 pictures showing Christ's passion, a book version of which was printed (Die Passion in 60 Bildern) but had to be immediately destroyed before it could be sold. The book was reissued after the war.
