= Georg Meistermann =

German painter

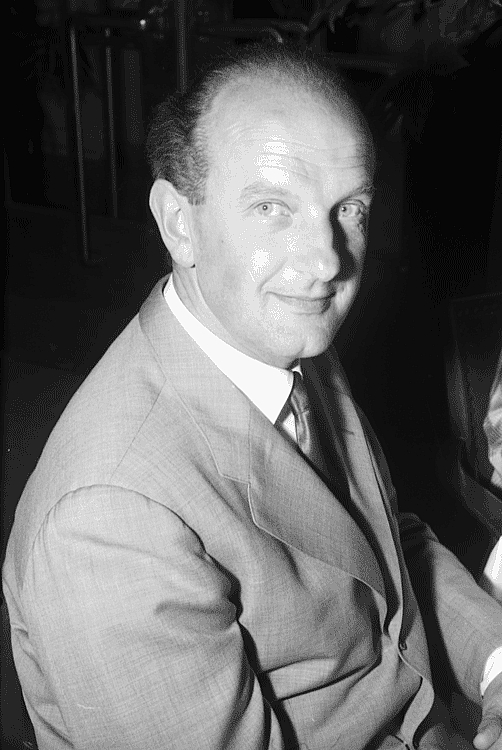
- Born: June 16, 1911; Solingen, German Empire
- Died: June 12, 1990 (aged 78); Cologne, West Germany
- Occupations: Painter and draftsman

Georg Meistermann (June 16, 1911 – June 12, 1990) was a German painter and draftsman who was also famous for his stained glass windows in the whole of Europe.

From 1930, Meistermann studied art at the Kunstakademie Düsseldorf under Werner Heuser, Heinrich Nauen and Ewald Mataré, representatives of the new avant-garde styles. In 1933 the Nazis condemned this sort of art as degenerate art, and he could not continue his studies. Therefore, he worked as an independent painter and art teacher in Solingen for some years.

Influenced by late Cubism and Alfred Manessier, he created abstract paintings, but he also produced portraits and wall paintings. Beginning in 1937, he made stained glass windows, immersing private and public spaces, as well as both historic and modern church rooms in colored light in an innovative manner, based on an interaction of color, form and line, for which he would become famous. "To bring the colour to floating, to detect meditative spaces and to conquer a depth of the painting directed towards transcendence has been his artistic programme." His early works in stained glass show the influence of the constructivist style of Johan Thorn Prikker, whose work Meistermann visited in 1938 in the Church of St. Georg in Cologne. From 1940s, he starts developing his personal artistic language. One example of his work, installed in 1957, is to be found in Berlin's Kaiser-Friedrich-Gedächtniskirche. In 1976, he designed four windows for the Collegio Teutonico, Rome. Another important work is his new design for St. Gereon's Basilica, Cologne (1979-1986), which he called "my religious testament and climax of my lifework". In 1957, Meistermann created a stained glass window for the Church of Bottrop, designed by architect Rudolf Schwarz, covering the entire west wall. Featuring a large spiral, it is regarded as the first purely abstract stained glass work in a German church, symbolising the church’s growing openness to modernism in the 1960s. The Stained Glass Association of America considers Meistermann "the most versatile German stained glass designer".

In 1953 the artist was appointed professor at the Städelschule, Frankfurt am Main. From 1955 to 1959 he hold a professorship at the Kunstakademie Düsseldorf, and from 1960 to 1976 he was a professor at the Staatliche Akademie der Bildenden Künste Karlsruhe. Among his students at the Düsseldorf Academy were Gotthard Graubner, Raimund Girke and HA Schult. Among his students at the Karlsruhe Academy were Gerold Bursian, Wolfgang Glöckler, Otto Mindhoff, K.J. Overkott and Hans-Günther van Look.

Meistermann participated at the documentas I (1955) and II (1959) in Kassel.

A devout Catholic, Meistermann worked for sacred rooms with great passion. With his art he wanted to praise the grace of God, looking for form-expressing solutions to glorify the Creator. However, he also criticized the Church, quarreling with those who thought they were in a position to claim special rights only because they administered the Christian faith: "I make propaganda for the Christian faith," he said, "but quite certainly, I do not make propaganda for the Church."

From 1967 to 1972, he was President of the German Artists Federation, requesting his colleagues in numerous papers and speeches to contribute their part to a more humane society.

In 1994, the Georg-Meistermann-Museum was opened in Wittlich.
