= Gert Heinrich Wollheim =

German painter (1894–1974)

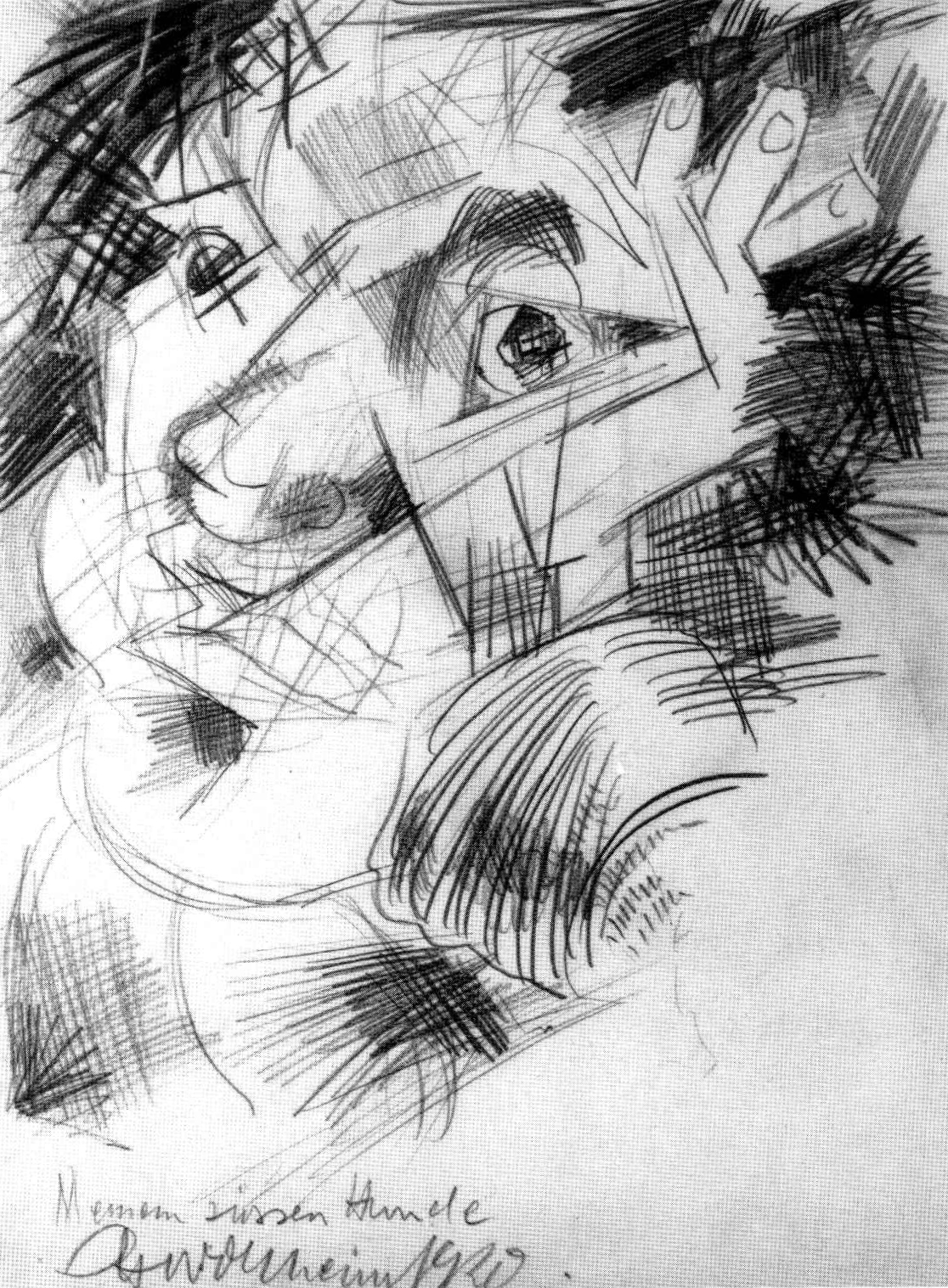
Gert H. Wollheim portrait by J. B. H. Hundt

Gert Heinrich Wollheim (11 September 1894 – 22 April 1974) was a German expressionist painter later associated with the New Objectivity, who fled Nazi Germany and worked in the United States after 1947.

== Life and work ==
Gert Heinrich Wollheim was born in Dresden-Loschwitz. From 1911 to 1913, he studied at the College of Fine Arts in Weimar, where his instructors included Albin Egger-Lienz and Gottlieb Forster. From 1914 to 1917 he was in military service in World War I, where he sustained an abdominal wound. After the war he lived in Berlin until 1919, when Wollheim, Otto Pankok (whom he had met at the academy in Weimar), Ulfert Lüken, Hermann Hundt and others created an artists' colony in Remels, East Frisia.

At the end of 1919, Wollheim and Pankok went to Düsseldorf and became founding members of the "Young Rhineland" group, which also included Max Ernst, Otto Dix, and Ulrich Leman. Wollheim was one of the artists associated with the art dealer Johanna Ey, and in 1922 he was taken to court over a painting displayed at her gallery. In 1925, he moved to Berlin, and his work, which always emphasized the theatrical and the grotesque, began a new phase of coolly objective representation. His work was part of the art competitions at the 1928 Summer Olympics and the 1932 Summer Olympics.

After Hitler seized power in 1933 Wollheim´s works were declared degenerate art and many were destroyed. He fled to France and became active in the Resistance. He was one of the co-founders of the Union des Artistes Allemandes Libres, an organization of exiled German artists founded in Paris in autumn 1937. In that same year, he became the companion of the dancer Tatjana Barbakoff. Meanwhile, in Munich, three of his pictures were displayed in the defamatory Nazi exhibition Entartete Kunst (Degenerate Art) in 1937.

From Paris, Wollheim fled to Saarbrücken and later to Switzerland. He was arrested in 1939 and held in a series of labor camps in France (Vierzon, Ruchard, Gurs and Septfonds) until his escape in 1942, after which he and his wife hid in the Pyrénées with the help of a peasant woman. At war's end in 1945 he returned to France.

In 1947 he moved to New York City and became an American citizen. He died in New York in 1974.

== Posthumous ==
In 2000, the August Macke Haus in Bonn presented an important retrospective exhibition of his work.

Wollheim's best-known work is probably Der Verwundete, 'The Wounded Man' (1919), one of the most horrifying images to be produced by any artist who had experienced the First World War. The oil on board painting shows a half-naked soldier writhing in agony after receiving a death-wound in the belly. A version of this image was used as one of 'Dr. Lecter's drawings' in the film Silence of the Lambs.
