= Ulrich Leman =

German painter

Ulrich Leman (15 October 1885 – 22 April 1988) was a German painter. He was one of the last painters of Rhenish Expressionism.

Born in Düsseldorf, he became interested in painting at an early age and in 1919 he co-founded the group "The Young Rheinland" with other young painters of the day, including Otto Dix and Gert Heinrich Wollheim.

During the early 1920s Ulrich Leman was a Meisterschüler under Heinrich Nauen at the Kunstakademie Düsseldorf.

In 1927 he befriended Johanna Ey, who as "Mutter Ey" became well known for her stewardship of young and upcoming artists of the day. Leman became a member of her circle, and his works began to appear in her galleries.

At the end of the 1920s Leman made his first trip to Mallorca and decided to move there. In 1930 the artist made his home in Deià, Mallorca.

This began an intense time, up until his death, of major accomplishments. During this time, he incorporated the themes of the Spanish island, its landscapes, people and their personalities. No other artist has understood quite so well, the characteristic features of the island, its appeal and its inflexibility and captured it so well in his works.

Ulrich Leman died in 1988 in Deià.
