= Young Rhineland =

German artist

Young Rhineland (Das Junge Rheinland) was an association of avant-garde artists formed in Düsseldorf on 24 February 1919.

== History ==
The poet Herbert Eulenberg was one of the main instigators of the group, along with painter Arthur Kaufmann and the writer and illustrator Adolf Uzarski. The group was formed following the lack of any Rhenish artists in the Great Berlin Exhibition. The art historian, Walter Cohen came up with the name in 1918 when he was organising the first exhibition of the group in the Kölnischer Kunstverein. Some earliest members of Young Rhineland included Heinrich Nauen, Adolf Uzarski, Arthur Kaufmann, Carlo Mense, Walter Ophey, Werner Heuser, Ernst te Peerdt and Wilhelm Kreis.
