= Tatjana Barbakoff =

Russian dancer

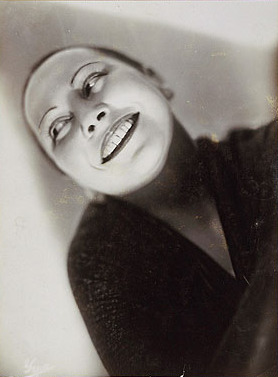
- Yva: Tatjana Barbakoff, 1929
- Born: Tsipora Edelberg; 15 August 1899; Hasenpoth, Courland Governorate, Russian Empire (now Latvia)
- Died: 6 February 1944 (aged 44); Auschwitz, Nazi Germany
- Occupation: Ballet dancer

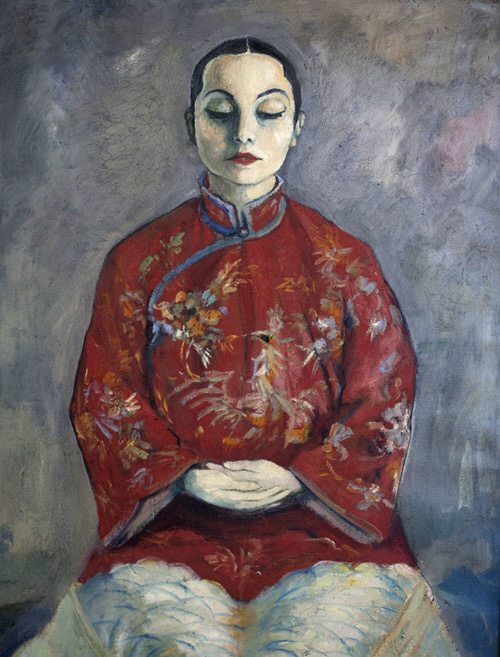
Waldemar Flaig: Tatjana Barbakoff, 1927

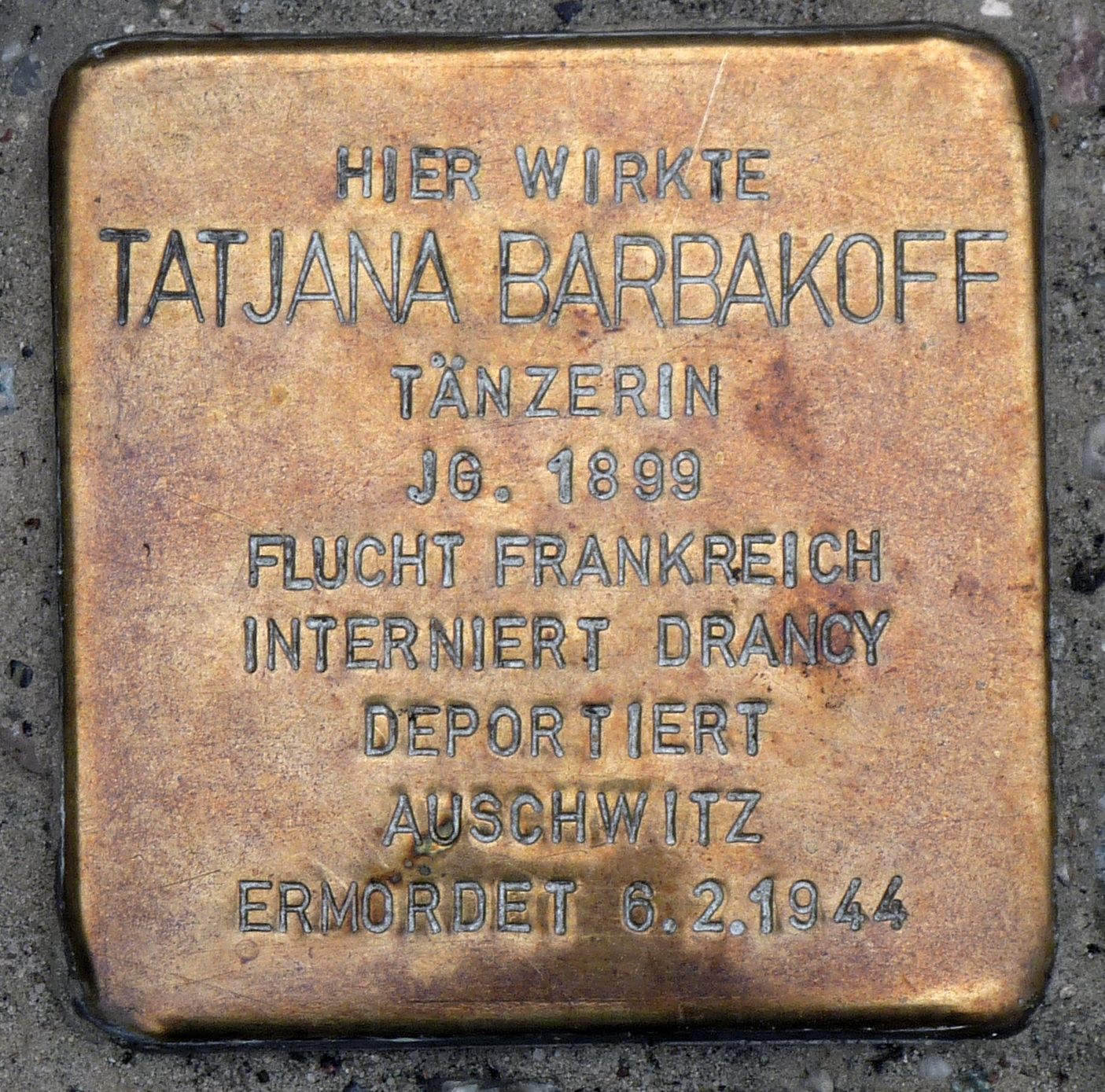
Stolperstein, Knesebeckstraße 100, in Berlin-Charlottenburg

Tatjana Barbakoff (15 August 1899 – 6 February 1944), born as Tsipora Edelberg, was a ballet and Chinese style dancer. She became a ballerina in Germany. After her death, Julia Tardi-Markus, in order to honor Barbakoff, initiated the "Tatjana Barbakoff Prize" in 1986 to help to encourage young dancers.

== Early life ==
Tatjana Barbakoff was born as Tsipora Edelberg in Hasenpoth, Courland Governorate, at the time a province of the Russian Empire, today in Latvia. She was the daughter of Aizik, a Russian born Jewish butcher, and Genya, who had been born in China. She changed her name to Tsipora. The parents had two daughters, Cilly and Fani. Barbakoff had an older brother, and after the early death of their mother in 1903, her father married Haja-Sora Itskovitch, with a step-sister following in 1912. She attended ballet school up until ten years of age, but had no further dance training as a child.

== Life ==
In 1918, she became attached to a German soldier, Georg Waldmann, who served in the Baltic states during World War I. They married later. With her husband, who performed under the pseudonym Marcel Boissier as a guest emcee, Barbakoff performed Russian and Chinese dances. In 1921, she staged solo performances in larger houses at home and abroad, where the costumes were usually designed for her, and described as plastic picturesque costumes. Some Jewish women were considered as cabaret leaders during this time period.

Tatjana Barbakoff, of Russian-Jewish and Chinese heritage, was a cabaret icon and international dance sensation, known for her flamboyant costumes, legendary beauty and sharp sense of humor.

From 1924, it was known that she included Chinese dances alongside Russian dances and parodies in her program. Because of her charisma, she became a public magnet, and a magnet for many artists including Rudolf Heinisch and Kasia von Szadurska, who portrayed her in numerous photos, paintings and sculptures. Barbakoff started more formal ballet training with the French ballerina Catherine Devilliers in 1927. Also in 1927, she separated from her husband. After an appearance in the Chopin Hall in Paris on 9 May 1933, she was able to leave Berlin with all her costumes and go to Paris.

== Internment and death ==
With her partner, Gert Heinrich Wollheim who was a painter, she traveled from Saarbrücken to Paris. In France, the Netherlands and Switzerland held their own for a while. After the invasion of France by German troops, she was sent on 10 May 1940 to Camp de Gurs for internment. In June she was released again and moved to Nay, and later to Clelles in Grenoble. On 20 October 1940 she wrote a desperate letter to her friend, Maria My, from Préchacq-Navarrenx (Pyrénées-Atlantiques), and asked for a food parcel. She had miraculously found her partner Wollheim in this Pyrenees village after months of internment. Following the withdrawal of Italian troops from the French Riviera, she went to Nice in 1944, where she was found hiding on the Côte d'Azur and picked up by the Gestapo. According to a briefing note dated 23 January 1944, she was deported to Drancy internment camp near Paris. On 3 February 1944, the 67 convoy took her to Auschwitz, where on 6 February 1944 she was murdered in a gas chamber.

== Portraits ==
- Waldemar Flaig : . Tatjana Barbakoff oil painting from 1927 in the Franciscan Museum in Villingen-Schwenningen
- Kasia from Szadurska : Tatjana Barbakoff. Pencil and chalk to 1929 in the Municipal Wessenberg Gallery Konstanz
- Rudolf Heinisch : . Tatjana Barbakoff oil painting of 1929, private collection
- Rudolf Heinisch : studies on the dancer Tatyana Barbakoff. Water color, pencil and chalk around 1928, private collection
- Gert Heinrich Wollheim : Tatjana Barbakoff oil on wood portrait 1928 held in Israel Museum in Jerusalem

== Literature ==
- Günter Goebbels: Tatjana Barbakoff. A forgotten dancer in pictures and documents . Circle Kulturbahnhof Eller eV, Düsseldorf 2009
- Anja Hellhammer: foreign-like as the Far East: Tanja Barbakoff. In: Amelie Soyka (Hg.): Dancing and dance and nothing but dance. p. 105-124
- Tatjana Barbakoff. Dancer and muse, with texts by Klara Drenker-Nagels, Hildegard Reinhardt, Günter Goebbels and Anja Hellhammer, club August Macke Haus Bonn, Bonn of 2003.
- Hildegard Reinhardt. Tatjana Barbakoff. Dancer and muse, in: World Art, Issue 2 February 2003.

== Legacy ==
In Paris, Julia Tardi-Markus, a co-dancer with Barbakoff, started the "Tatjana Barbakoff Prize" in 1986 to help to encourage young dancers. Gert Heinrich Wollheim painted a portrait of in 1928 which still hangs in the Israel Museum in Jerusalem.

The Düsseldorf City Museum hosts an exposition to honor Tatjana Barbakoff. It contains photographs, and some of her stage costumes, and many of her playbills. Some of Barbakoff’s stage costumes were given by Gert Wollheim’s widow, Mona Loeb (1908–1997) to Düsseldorf City Museum.
