= Walther Benser =

German photographer

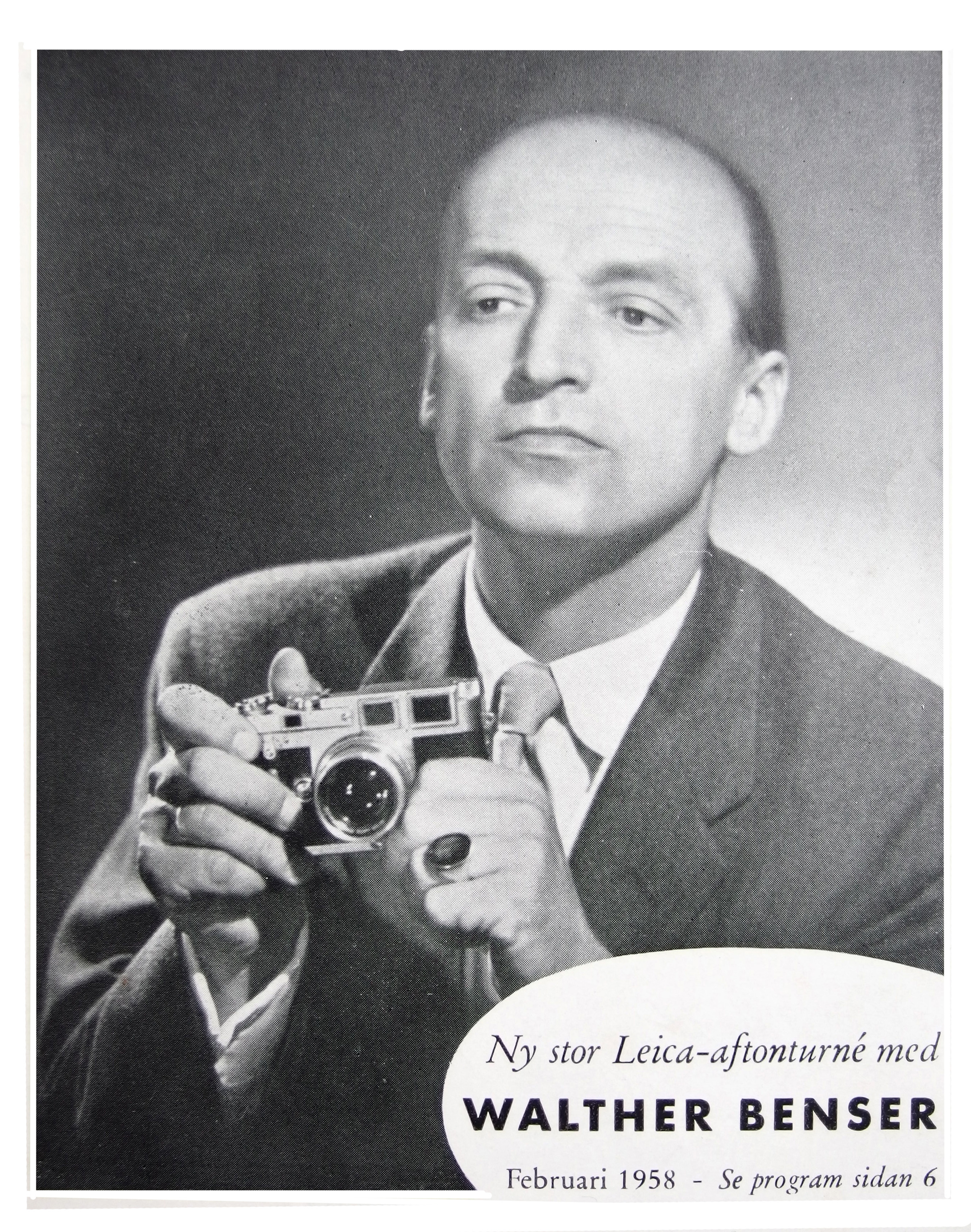
- Sweden, January 1958
- Born: 23 October 1912
- Died: 21 April 2002 (aged 89)
- Occupation: Photographer

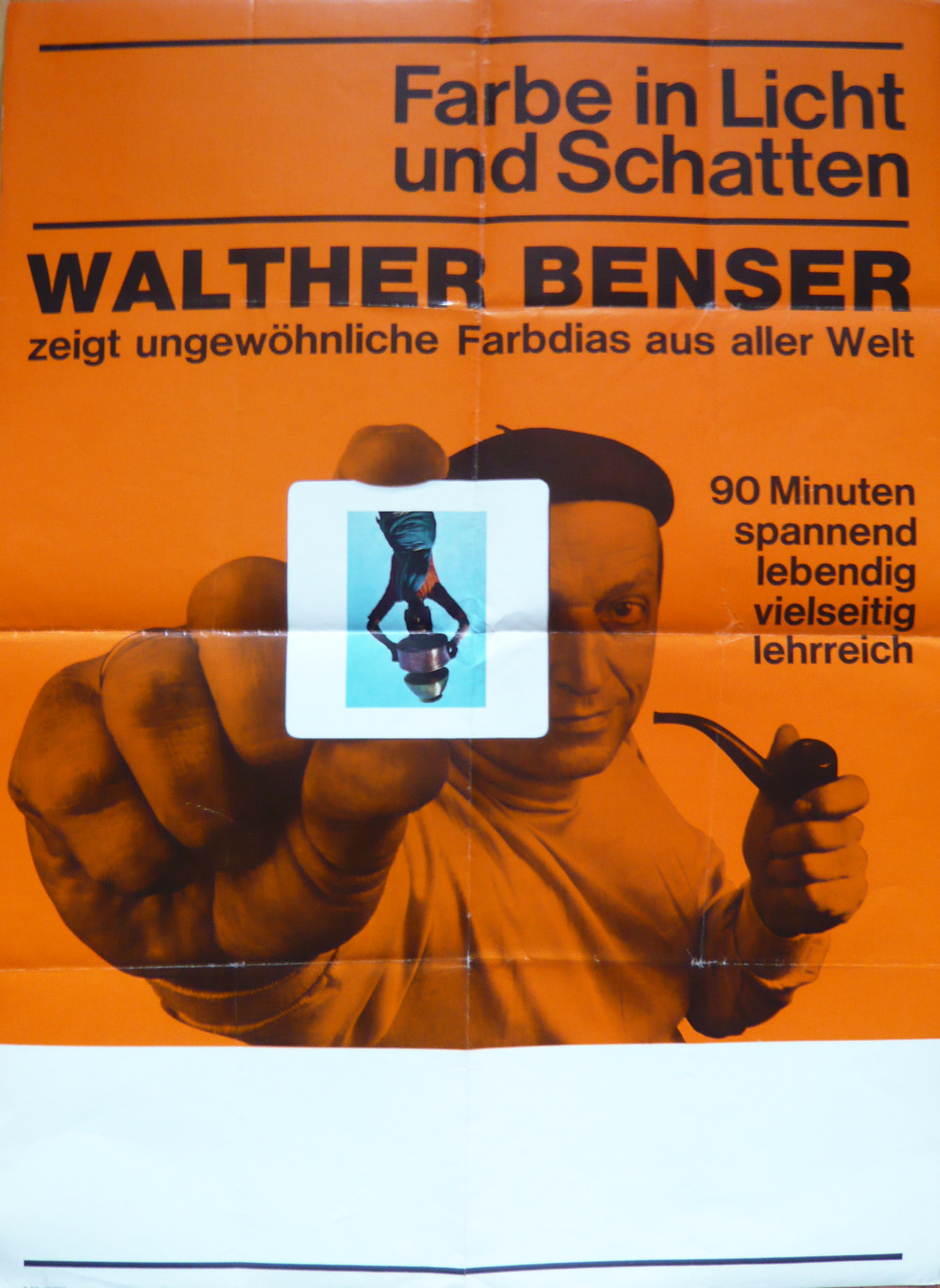
Poster for color slide presentation by Benser subtitled "Made with light and shadow"

Walther Benser (23 October 1912 – 21 April 2002) was a photographer, photo journalist and merchant from Germany. He traveled as a freelance photographer with a Leica camera, gave slide lecture tours and established the stock photo agency ZEFA. In 1989 he gave a presentation "Sixty Years with the Leica" at the Leica Historical Society of America meeting in Philadelphia.

He was married to painter Ursula Benser (née Heuser), daughter of painter Werner Heuser.

== Bibliography ==
- Walther Benser (1957). Wir photographieren farbig. Europäischer Buchklub.
