= Arthur Kaufmann (artist) =

German painter (1888–1971)

Arthur Kaufmann (1888–1971) was an avant-garde German painter, who was a key figure in the Post-Expressionist and New Objectivity art movements.

== About ==
He was a founding member in 1919 of Das Jungle Rheinland (Young Rhineland), a stylistically diverse group co-led by Herbert Eulenberg, Gert Wollheim, and Adolf Uzarski, which was united only by their rejection of academic art. Other members included Otto Dix, Theo Champion, Karl Schwesig, Walter Ophey, and Adalbert Trillhaase. During this era, he created such works as Contemporaries: Düsseldorf's Intellectual Scene (1925) and his Portrait of Betty Kohlhaas and Jankel Adler (1927).

Jewish in origin, Kaufmann was labeled "non-Aryan" by the Nazis in 1933 and discharged, along with many of his colleagues, from his post at the Düsseldorf School of Applied Arts. He relocated to the United States, embarking upon a career as a celebrated portrait painter. He specialized in depictions of well-known Jewish men, including such diverse luminaries as Hollywood actor Edward G. Robinson, physicist Albert Einstein, and composer and painter George Gershwin (whose affidavit was responsible for Kaufmann's safe departure from Germany). His portrait of Gershwin is now held by the National Portrait Gallery at the Smithsonian Institution.
