= Walter L. Cohen =

American politician (1860–1930)

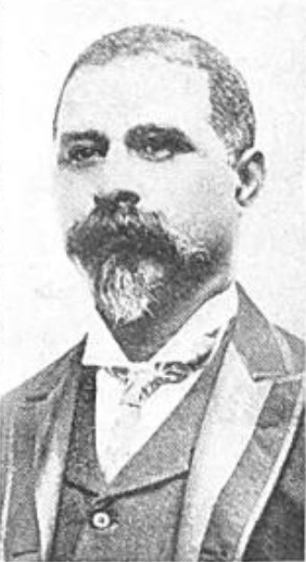

Chairman of the Louisiana Republican Party
- In office 1892–1930

Personal details
- Born: January 22, 1860 New Orleans, Louisiana, U.S.
- Died: December 29, 1930 (aged 70)
- Party: Republican
- Education: Straight College

Walter Louis Cohen (January 22, 1860 – December 29, 1930) was a public official, Republican Party leader, and businessman in the United States. He was active in fraternal organizations. An African American, he held several federal positions.

His father was Jewish, his mother African American, and he was Catholic. He said he was everything the Ku Klux Klan abominates.

He was born free in New Orleans. He attended St. Louis Catholic School and Straight College. His daughter Camille Cohen Jones was a community leader in Chicago. Cohen served as chair of the Louisiana Republican Party from 1892 to 1930. He attended every Republican National Convention from 1896 through 1924.

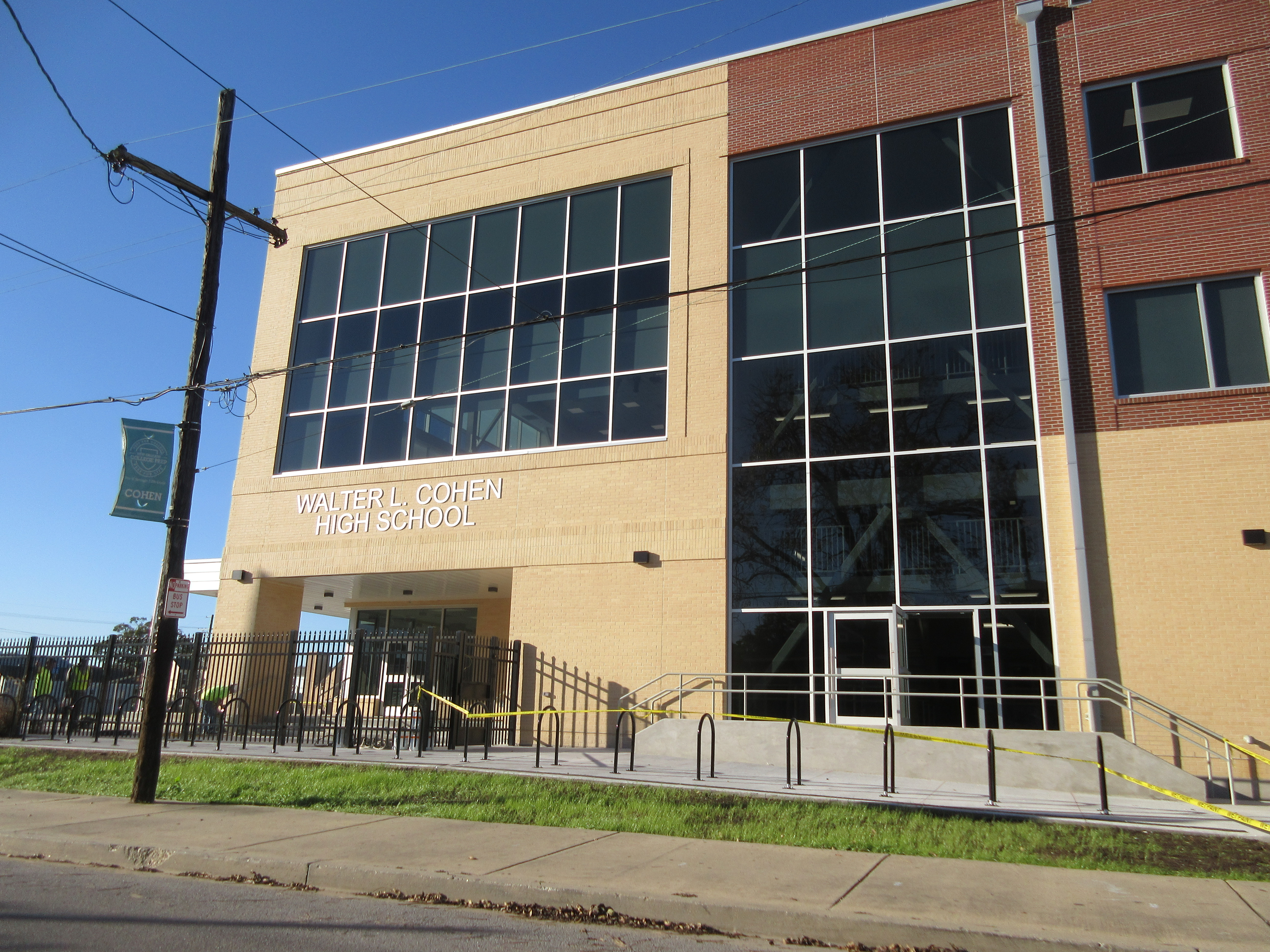
Walter L. Cohen School building in 2022

Walter L. Cohen High School was named for him. The school's yearbook was also named in tribute to him.
