= Ursula Benser =

German painter

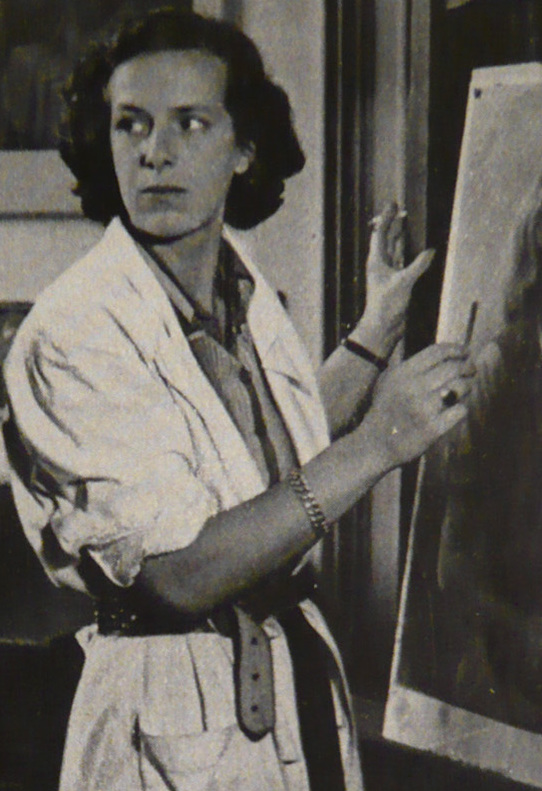
- Ursula Benser (1960)
- Born: Ursula Maria Luise Heuser; 1 August 1915; Düsseldorf, Germany
- Died: 2 March 2001 (aged 85); Domburg, Netherlands
- Education: Kunstakademie Düsseldorf
- Spouse: Walther Benser (m. 1936–2001)
- Children: 3
- Parents: Werner Heuser (father); Mira Sohn-Rethel (mother)

Ursula Benser, née Ursula Maria Luise Heuser (1915–2001) was a German painter and draftsperson. She worked in pastels, watercolor, and gouache, on paper or canvas.

She was born on 1 August 1915 in Düsseldorf, Germany, to parents Mira (née Sohn-Rethel), and painter Werner Heuser. Her brother was Klaus Heinrich Heuser (1909–1994), her maternal grandfather was Karl Rudolf Sohn, and her maternal great-grandfather was Karl Ferdinand Sohn. In 1936, she was married to photographer, Walther Benser.
