= Adolf Uzarski =

German writer, artist, and illustrator

Adolf Uzarski (April 14, 1885 – July 14, 1970) was a German writer, artist, and illustrator associated with the New Objectivity movement.

He was born in Ruhrort bei Duisburg and studied at the Cologne School of Architecture before enrolling in 1906 at the Düsseldorf School of Arts and Crafts. Initially, Uzarski's work was in the tradition of Art Nouveau. He exhibited in Berlin and Hagen in the years before World War I, and also became a successful commercial artist. During the war, his work began displaying elements of Expressionism. While directing the advertising department of the Tietz department store, in 1916–17 he produced the portfolio of lithographs, Totentanz ("Danse Macabre"). Beginning in 1919 he exhibited with "Das Junge Rheinland" (Young Rhineland), of which he was a founding member. This stylistically diverse group, which also included Arthur Kaufmann and Herbert Eulenberg, was united only by their rejection of academic art.

Active as a visual artist and also as a writer of poetry and fiction, Uzarski illustrated his own books and those of others. During the Weimar years he was one of the artists championed by the Düsseldorf art dealer Johanna Ey, until a rift between them in 1923, after which Uzarski left the "Young Rhineland" group to form the "Rheingruppe" (Rhine group), with whom he exhibited from 1925 to 1930.

His art was caricatural in style and sharply satirical of bourgeois society. In 1942, condemned as a degenerate artist by the Nazis, he was forbidden to paint, and went into hiding in Robertville, Belgium. At the end of World War II, Uzarski returned to Düsseldorf and continued his career. He was the subject of a retrospective exhibition at the Berlin Academy of Arts in 1967.

Uzarski died in Düsseldorf in 1970.

A portrait of Uzarski by Otto Dix is in the Museum Kunstpalast in Düsseldorf.

== Books written by Uzarski ==
- Möppi, Munich, 1921
- Die spanische Reise, Munich, 1921
- Chamäleon. Ein Heldenbuch., Munich, 1922
- Die Reise nach Deutschland., Potsdam, 1924
- Tun-Kwang-pipi, Potsdam, 1924
- Herr Knobloch, Munich, 1926
- Kurukallawalla, Munich, 1927
- Der Fall Uzarski, Munich, 1928
- Das Hotel Zum Paradies, Munich, 1929
- Beinahe Weltmeister, Munich, 1930
- Panoptikum, Berlin, 1955
- Lager-Schaden, Berlin, 1985
