= Vezin =

Vezin is a surname. Notable people with the surname include:

- Frederick Vezin (1859–1933), American painter, etcher and lithographer
- Hermann Vezin (1829–1910), American actor and writer
- Jane Vezin (1827–1902), British actress

== See also ==
- Vezin-le-Coquet, a French commune
- Charency-Vezin, a French commune
- Vezins (disambiguation)
