= Julius Roeting =

Austrian painter

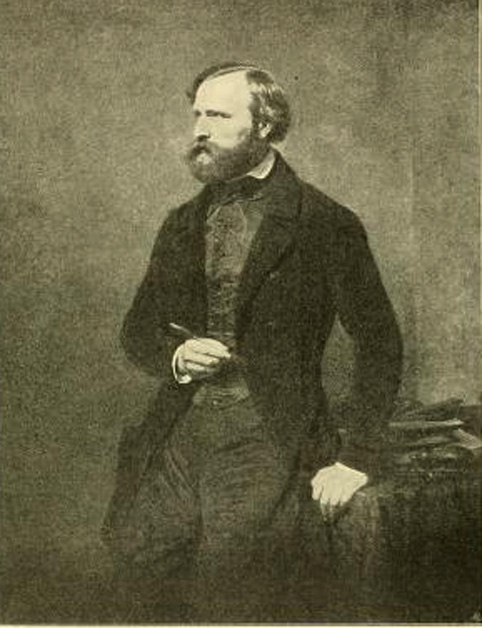
Julius Roeting; portrait by Karl Friedrich Lessing (before 1880)

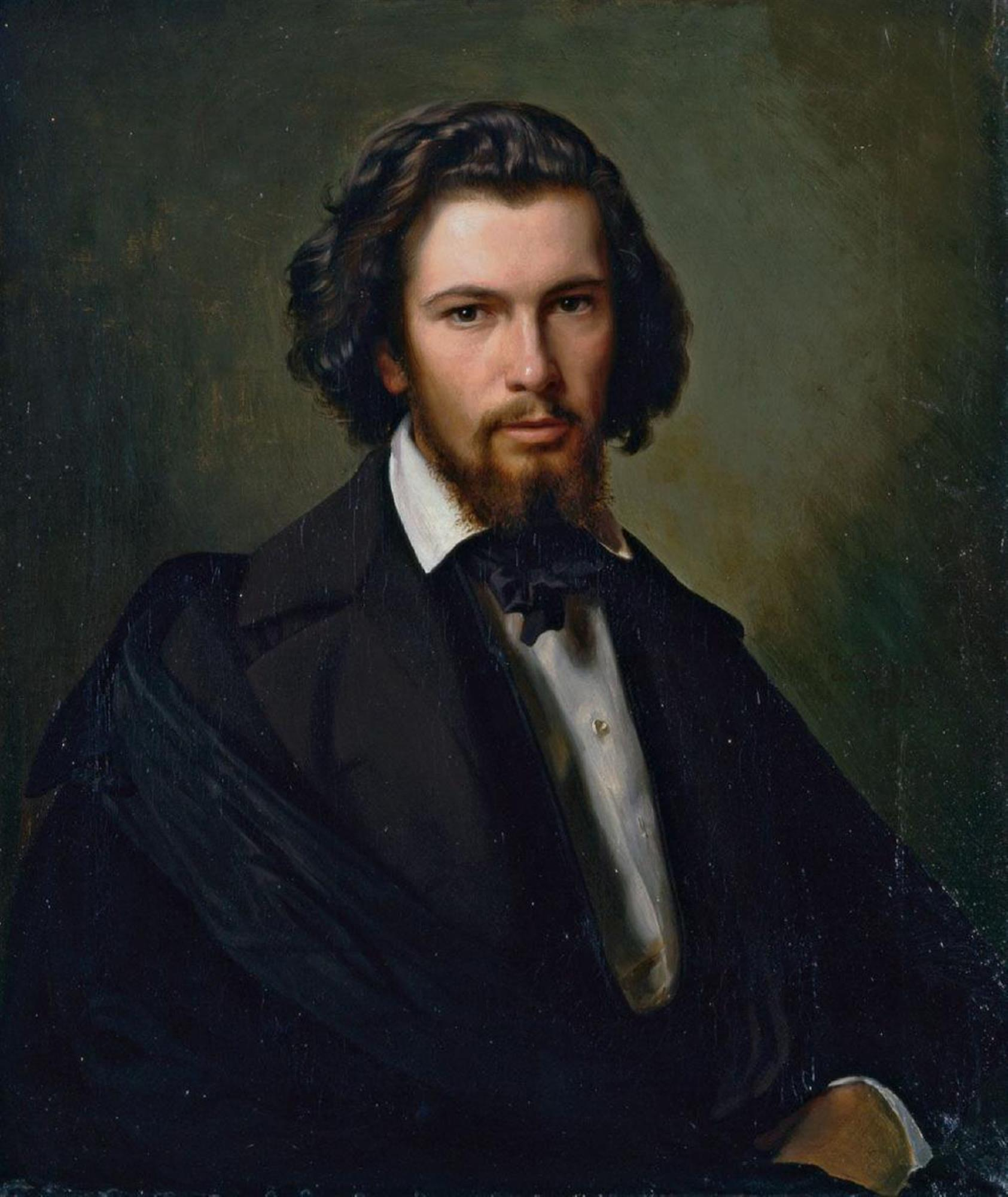
Portrait of Dr. Karl Andreas Berthelen (1822–1906)

Julius Amatus Roeting (13 September 1822, in Dresden – 21 May 1896, in Düsseldorf) was an Austrian painter.

== Biography ==
He displayed artistic talent while still very young and, at the age of twelve, helped create a painting of a lion on a local theater curtain. He began his formal art studies at the Kunstakademie Dresden with Eduard Bendemann then, in 1849, moved to Düsseldorf, where he took over a painting class from the retiring Theodor Hildebrandt at the Kunstakademie Düsseldorf. In 1868, he was named a professor, to replace the late Karl Ferdinand Sohn.

During these years, he travelled extensively. He visited Krefeld in 1854, where he met and married his wife, Maria. The following year, he spent some time in Paris with Ludwig Knaus, then went on to London to paint several portraits, including one of Lord Cranworth, but left before completing his commissions, citing homesickness.

In 1855, he was awarded the Order of St. Michael by King Maximilian II of Bavaria and, in 1877, received the Order of the Red Eagle.

Although he created numerous historical scenes, religious and profane, he became best known for his masculine portraits, including Emanuel Leutze, Wilhelm von Schadow, Carl Friedrich Lessing and Ernst Moritz Arndt. He was a member of the Prussian Academy of Arts and the Vienna Academy of Arts, as well as the "Malkasten", a local society in Düsseldorf. The painter Max Volkhart was his son-in-law.

He died after a short illness (probably pneumonia) leaving several portraits unfinished.

== Notable students ==
- Ernst Anders
- Friedrich Bindewald
- Arthur Kampf
- Hermann Knackfuß
- August Lemmer
- Otto Modersohn
- Karl Mücke
- Heinrich Nüttgens
- Frederick Vezin
- Max Volkhart
- Heinrich Wieschebrink
- Carl Wünnenberg

== Sources ==
- Thieme-Becker, vols. 27/28: Piermaria to Rosa. E.A. Seemann, Leipzig 1999, p. 505.
