= Hurlstone Fairchild =

Dutch American painter (1907–1983)

- Born: Donald H. "D.H." Fairchild; January 30, 1893; Danville, Illinois
- Died: February 5, 1966 (aged 73); Tucson, Arizona
- Education: Missouri University of Science and Technology
- Known for: Painting; Printmaking; Sketching
- Movement: Impressionism

Hurlstone Fairchild (January 30, 1893 – February 5, 1966) was an American mining engineer and celebrated 20th century painter best known for his vivid depictions of the American Southwest desert landscape. Over a career that spanned two decades, Fairchild produced approximately 300 canvases, numerous drawings, and woodblocks, with his work held in private collections and museums across the United States, Canada, England, Norway, France, and Brazil.

== Early life and education ==
Hurlstone Fairchild was born January 30, 1893, Donald H. "D.H." Fairchild in Danville, Illinois, to Rev. and Mrs. W.D. Fairchild. He attended college in Pana, Illinois, later studied at the University of Illinois, and graduated from the Missouri School of Mines and Metallurgy. In 1915, he moved to Arizona to work as a mining engineer for the Ray Consolidated Copper Company and the Ray and Magma mines in Superior, Arizona.

While working across Arizona, Colorado, Utah, and New Mexico, Fairchild became deeply acquainted with the desert's changing colors, violent storms, and expansive skies—elements that later became central themes in his artwork.

== Career ==
After contracting encephalitis in 1920, Fairchild took up painting during his recovery. He recalled, "It was like being a different person. In fact I was different, with entirely new goals and ambitions."

By 1922, he had won first prize for his painting Desert Road at the Arizona State Fair in Phoenix, Arizona and at a state competition in Illinois. His early mentors included Charles Vezin, a former president of the Art Students League of New York, and the Venice-based artist Sacha who painted alongside Fairchild in Arizona during the mid-1930s.

Throughout the 1930s and 1940s, Fairchild's paintings were exhibited widely across the United States. His works were known for their vivid desert palettes and mastery of atmosphere, praised for capturing both the drama and delicate subtleties of the Southwest landscape. Art critics such as Carey Orr compared Fairchild's impact on the Southwest to that of Charles Russell on the Northwest.

Fairchild traveled extensively to Wyoming, Utah, Colorado, and New Mexico, sketching and painting landscapes. His travels included studying landscapes at the Simon Snyder Sunlight Dude Ranch and painting in Yellowstone National Park and the Grand Teton regions.

During World War II, Fairchild worked as an aircraft engineer in California, though he continued to paint when possible. After the war, he resumed exhibiting, opened the Gallery of Southwestern Art at the Country Club Plaza in Tucson, Arizona in 1952, and continued receiving critical acclaim.

In 1955, he was elected a Fellow of the Royal Society of Arts in London and, in 1956, was invited to join the "Fifty American Artists," an honorary society for traditional oil and watercolor artists.

== Later years ==
Fairchild lived and worked at his Spanish Revival-style home at 4001 Calle de Jardin in Tucson's San Clemente neighborhood. An avid gardener, his desert botanical patios were frequently featured in Tucson newspapers.

Beginning in 1956, Fairchild's health declined due to tremors and partial paralysis. Despite undergoing two brain operations, he continued to paint, although he focused on smaller works. He died in Tucson on February 5, 1966, at the age of 73.

== Legacy ==
Fairchild's work was celebrated posthumously in major exhibitions, including a 1969 retrospective at the University of Arizona Museum of Art and a 1971 memorial exhibition at St. Philip's in the Hills Gallery.

The University of Arizona Museum of Art published La Tierra Encantada in conjunction with the 1969 retrospective, with Museum Director William E. Steadman writing, "Few artists delighted more in nature than he."

Over his lifetime, Fairchild's paintings became part of permanent collections at institutions such as the Denver Art Museum, Valley National Bank, and the Yavapai Museum at Grand Canyon Village.

== Art exhibitions ==
- 1938 — Art Institute of Chicago, Chicago
- 1951 — Denver Art Museum, Denver, Colorado — Permanent Collection
- 1961 — Yavapai Museum, Grand Canyon Village, Arizona — Permanent Collection
- 1961 — Valley National Bank, Phoenix, Arizona — Permanent Collection
- 1966 — University of Arizona Museum of Art, Tucson, Arizona — Retrospective

== Public collections ==
- Grand Canyon National Park Collection, Arizona
- Canton Museum of Art (Canton, Ohio) The museum holds "Desert Distance," a 32" x 37" oil on canvas painting by Fairchild.
- University of Arizona Museum of Art, Tucson, Arizona
- Amon Carter Museum of American Art (Fort Worth, Texas) Museum's archives contain correspondence and pamphlets related to Fairchild.
- Tucson Chamber of Commerce, Tucson, Arizona
- Denver Museum of Art, Colorado

== Books ==
- An artist's notebook: Selected sketches from studies made at the Grand Canyon, 1950.
- La Tierra Encantada by William E. Steadman, 1969 Edition. Tucson, Ariz. Printed By Walker Lithocraft Printing, C1969.
