= Ernst Anders =

German painter (1845–1911)

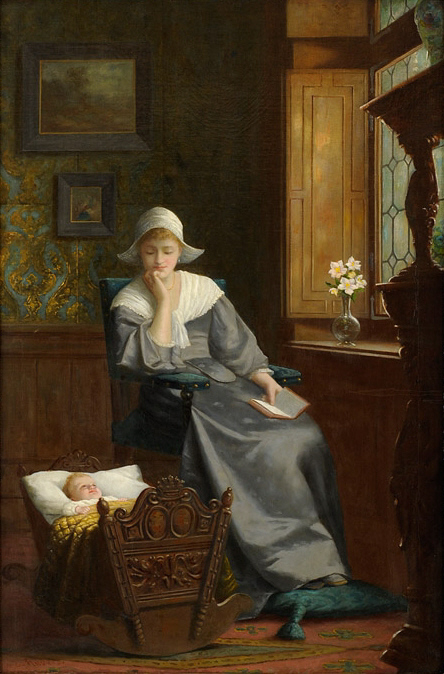
Mother's Pride and Joy

Ernst Anders (26 March 1845 – 1911) was a German painter.

He was born in Magdeburg. He began his artistic education as a private student of Andreas Müller then, in 1863, enrolled at the Kunstakademie Düsseldorf, where he studied with Rudolf Wiegmann, Heinrich Mücke, Karl Ferdinand Sohn and Julius Roeting. From 1868 to 1872, he was a private student of Wilhelm Sohn. Most of his paintings were genre scenes, but he made his living doing portraits, including many of his fellow artists. He died in 1911 in Mölln.
