= Deutz, Cologne =

Borough of Cologne

Deutz
- Stadtteil of Cologne
- Map of Deutz within the district Innenstadt
- Interactive map of Deutz
- Location within Germany Location within North Rhine-Westphalia
- Coordinates: 50°56′05″N 6°59′16″E
- Country: Germany
- State: North Rhine-Westphalia
- Admin. region: Cologne
- District: Urban district
- City: Cologne
- Borough: Innenstadt
- Time zone: UTC+01:00 (CET)
  - Summer (DST): UTC+02:00 (CEST)

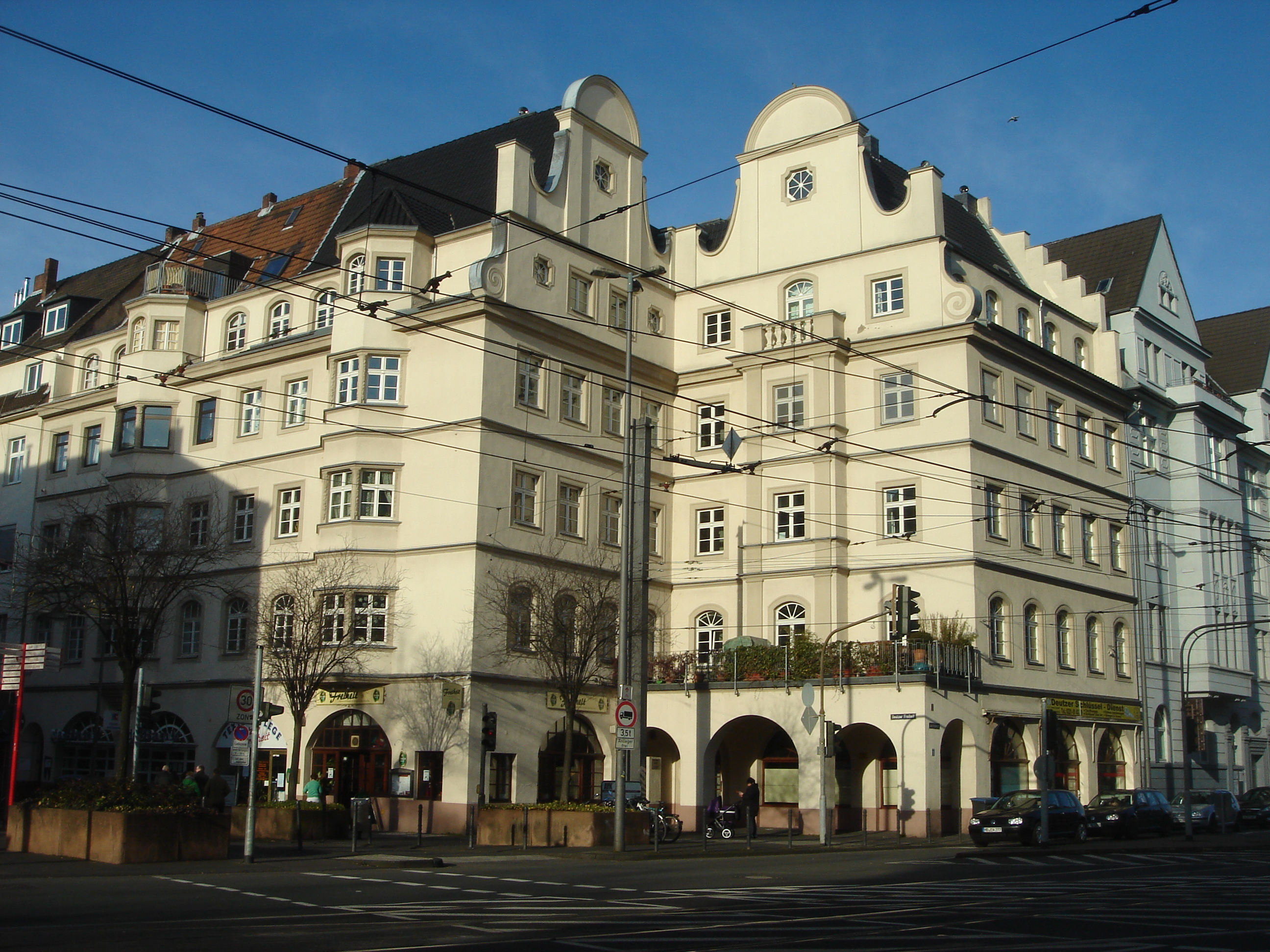
Deutzer Freiheit with Riphahn Building

The Cologne borough of Deutz (German pronunciation: [dɔʏts]; Kölsch: Düx [dʏks]) is a part of central Cologne, Germany, and was once an independent town known as Deutz am Rhein.

== History ==
Deutz was established under Roman Emperor Constantine I in 310 AD, when he established Castrum Divitia, a military camp built on the banks of the Rhine across from Colonia Claudia Ara Agrippinensium. Camp and city were linked via a bridge from the same time. During the Middle Ages, Deutz was an important centre of learning in medieval Germany. Up into the early Middle Ages it was known by the Latin name Divitia, from the 10th century as Tuitium. It was located on the right bank of the Rhine, opposite Cologne, which grew up on the left bank.

In 1002, the old castle in Deutz was made a Benedictine monastery by Heribert, archbishop of Cologne, and the important abbey was home to many influential theologians, such as Rupert of Deutz. Permission to fortify the town was in 1230 granted to the citizens by the archbishop of Cologne, between whom and the counts of Berg it was divided in 1240. It was burnt in 1376, 1445 and 1583; and in 1678, after the Treaties of Nijmegen, the fortifications were dismantled; they were rebuilt in 1816 and finally razed in 1888.

In 1869, Nicolaus August Otto and Eugen Langen moved their company NA Otto and Cie to Deutz, where the company was renamed to Gasmotoren-Fabrik Deutz (the "Deutz Gas Engine Manufacturing Company"). Arguably, this is the birthplace of the modern Otto-engine, precursor for all modern internal combustion engines.

== Modern Deutz ==
Deutz was formally incorporated into Cologne in 1888. Modern Deutz is the part of the Cologne city centre on the right bank of the river. The location of Deutz on the river embankment opposite the old town of Cologne, the district serves as an important business centre and transportation hub: next to the Rheinpark, the Cologne trade fair grounds, the Lanxess Arena and Köln Messe/Deutz station, there are a number of municipal and regional government offices based in Deutz. Politically Deutz is part of the administrative district Innenstadt.

== People ==
The painter August Lemmer and the socialist politician August Bebel were born in Deutz.
