= Rudolf Wiegmann =

German painter (1804–1865)

- Born: Heinrich Ernst Gottfried Rudolf Wiegmann; 17 April 1804; Nordstemmen, Holy Roman Empire
- Died: 17 April 1865 (aged 61); Düsseldorf, Kingdom of Prussia
- Occupations: Painter; archaeologist; art historian; graphic artist; architect
- Spouse: Marie Wiegmann (1841–1865)

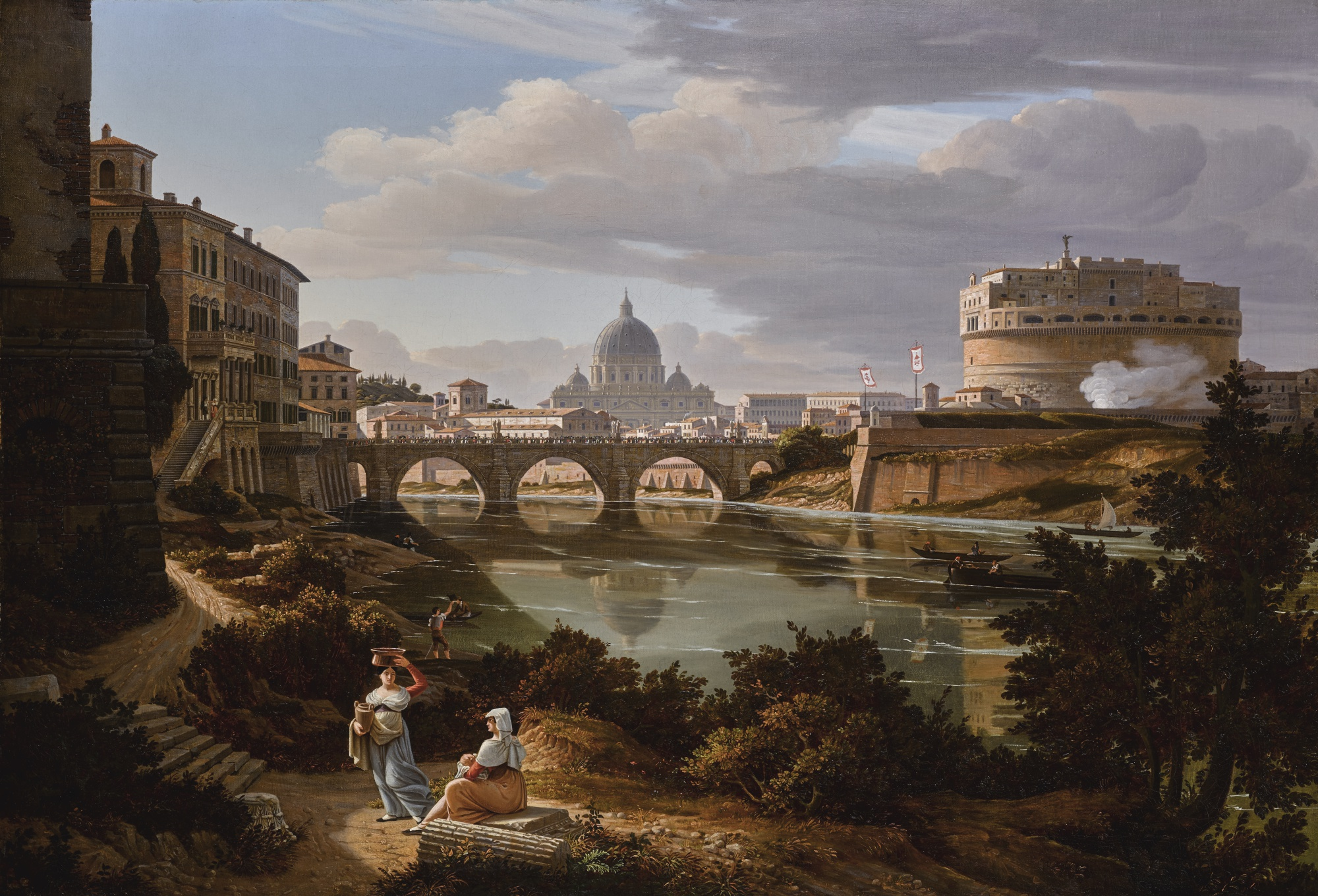
Rome Along the Tiber; with views of Castel Sant'Angelo and Saint Peter's Basilica

Heinrich Ernst Gottfried Rudolf Wiegmann (17 April 1804 – 17 April 1865) was a German painter, archaeologist, art historian, graphic artist and architect. He worked in the Neoclassical style and, as a painter, is best known for his vedute. His wife, Marie Wiegmann, whom he married in 1841, was also a painter of some note.

== Biography ==
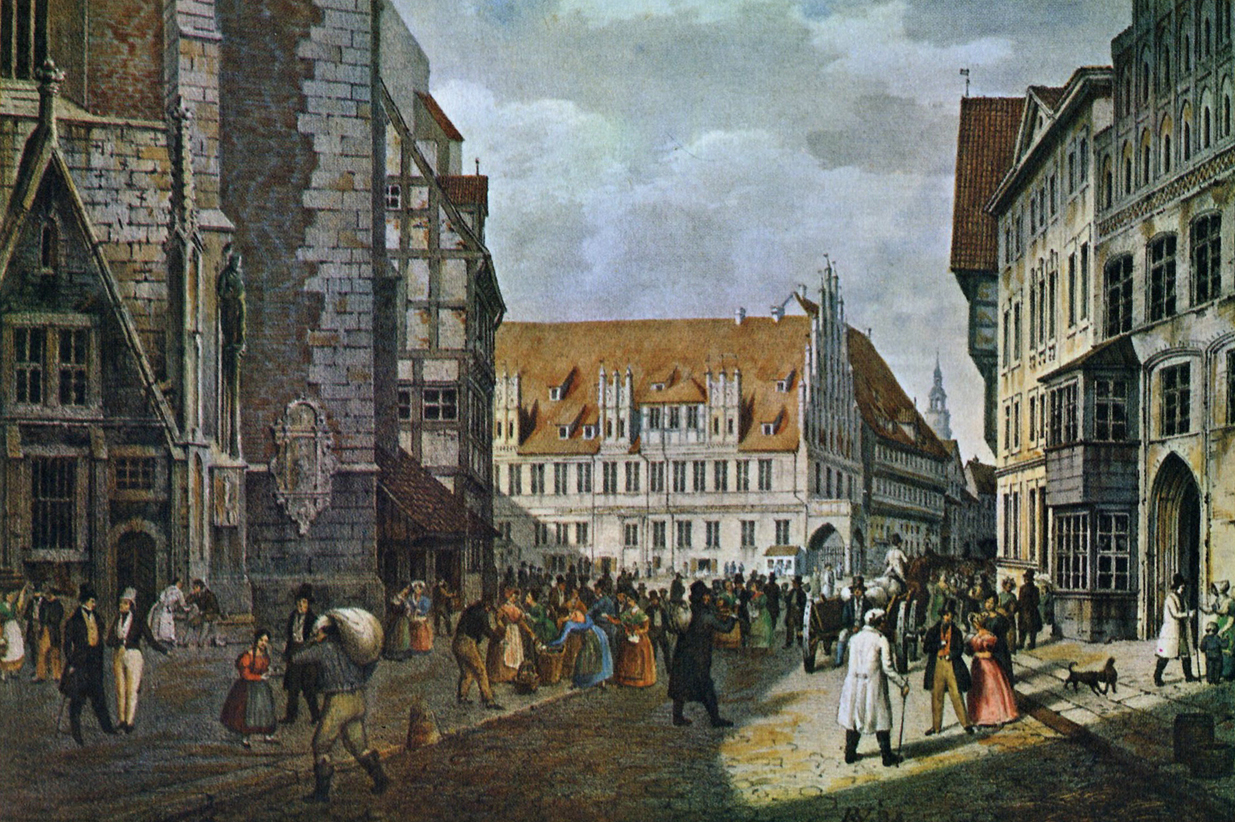
The Marktplatz in Hanover

Wiegmann was born on 17 April 1804 in Nordstemmen. He came from a military family. His father was a Lieutenant (later Captain) in the Tenth Infantry Regiment and was killed at the Battle of Waterloo, where he was serving as an adjutant to Colonel Georg du Plat.

As a child, he often visited St.Dionysius Church in Nordstemmen and its Gothic architecture left a deep impression on him. He began by studying architecture, mathematics and astronomy at the "Ratsgymnasium" in Hanover, where his family had relocated after his father's death. One of his childhood friends was August Heinrich Andreae, who would later become the City Architect for Hanover. After 1823, he and Andreae attended the University of Göttingen, where he studied history, the natural sciences and archaeology and was especially impressed by the lectures of Karl Otfried Müller.

He began his art studies in Darmstadt with the City Architect, Georg Moller, who encouraged him to supplement his class work through practical research in Rome. Accordingly, in 1828, he went to work for the German Archaeological Institute, investigating the wall paintings at Pompeii. He remained there until 1832 and became part of the German art colony.

After his return, he devoted himself to creating vedute of Hanover; oil paintings, watercolors, lithographs and etchings, which he published as an album in 1835. During this time, his only architectural work involved a tomb vault for Johann Ludwig Söhlmann (1797–1834), a leather manufacturer. He also became a member of the "Kunstverein Hannover" (Art Association) and served on the committee that chose works for their exhibitions.

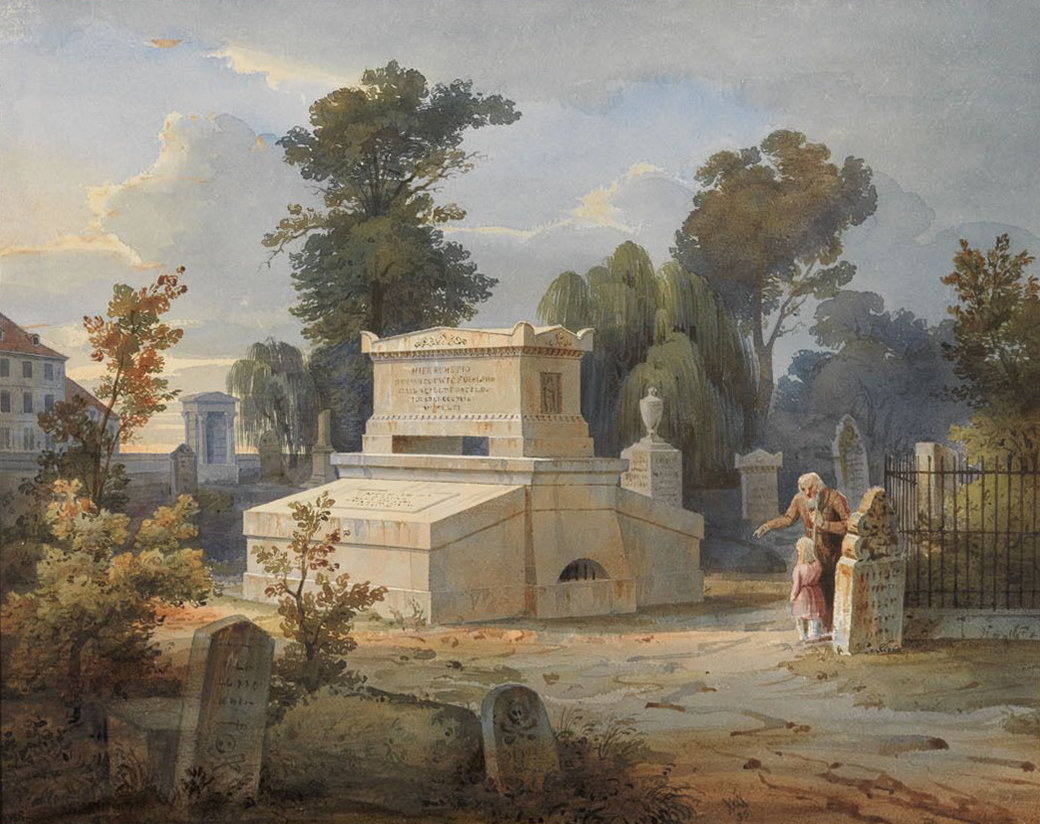
The tomb of Johann Ludwig Söhlmann

=== His career in Düsseldorf ===
He was, however, unsatisfied with his career in Hanover and moved to Düsseldorf in 1836. There he published a book based on his work in Pompeii: The Painting of the Ancients in Application and Technique. This resulted in a dispute with the architect, Leo von Klenze, who questioned Wiegmann's conclusions. Wiegmann replied in 1839 with Sir Leo von Klenze and Our Art.

After 1836, he taught at the Kunstakademie Düsseldorf. He was named a Professor of Architecture and Perspective in 1839; a position he held until his death. From 1846, he was also head of the Academic Secretariat, under Director Friedrich Wilhelm Schadow, and was responsible for correspondence, matriculations and programs. During these years, he became an advocate of Rundbogenstil, a type of Romanesque Revival architecture and designed a home for Schadow on what is now Schadowstraße.

In 1839, he designed a new system for roof joints that he described in a book called The Construction of Chain Bridges According to the Triangle System and Their Application to Roof Joints. However, a virtually identical system was invented at about the same time by the French engineer Camille Polonceau, who used it to build stations for the Paris-Versailles railway, so it has come to be known as a "Polonceau Roof".

He was a member of the "Kunstverein für die Rheinlande und Westfalen", serving on its administrative council. After 1844, he edited its official publication, the Correspondenzblatt. In 1857, he was named a corresponding member of the Royal Institute of British Architects. During his later years, he suffered from a chest ailment (possibly tuberculosis) and resigned his positions at the Kunstverein shortly before his death.

His son, Arnold, was killed at the Battle of Spicheren in 1870. Two years later, his personal papers were destroyed in a fire at the Kunstverein.

== Notable students ==
- Oswald Achenbach
- Ernst Anders
- Hugo Becker
- Georg Bleibtreu
- Lorenz Clasen
- August Eduard Schliecker
- Wilhelm Sohn
- John Robinson Tait

== Writings by Wiegmann online ==
- Die Malerei der Alten in ihrer Anwendung und Technik insbesondere als Decorationsmalerei. Preface by Karl Otfried Müller. Verlag der Hahnschen Hofbuchhandlung, Hannover 1836
- Der Ritter Leo von Klenze und unsere Kunst. Schreiner, Düsseldorf 1839.
- Über den Ursprung des Spitzbogenstils. With an appendix: concerning the establishment of a society for medieval architecture. Julius Buddeus, Düsseldorf 1842
- Die Königliche Kunst-Akademie zu Düsseldorf. Ihre Geschichte, Einrichtung und Wirksamkeit und die Düsseldorfer Künstler. With an autobiography.
