= Marie Wiegmann =

German painter (1826–1893)

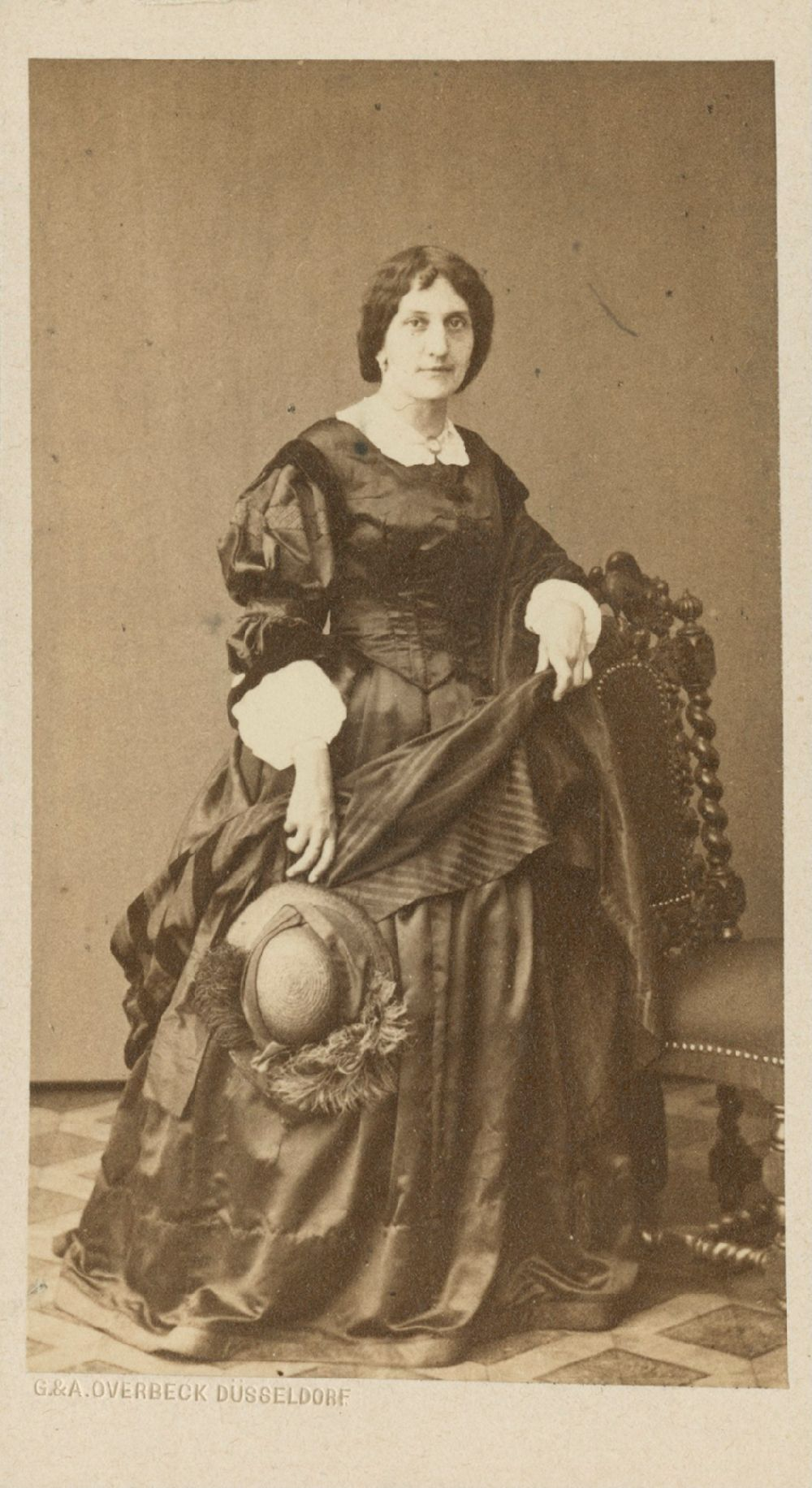
- Marie Wiegmann by G. & A. Overbeck (firm), c. 1868
- Born: 7 November 1820; Srebrna Gora, Poland
- Died: 4 December 1893 (aged 73); Düsseldorf, Germany
- Education: Düsseldorf Academy
- Spouse: Rudolf Wiegmann

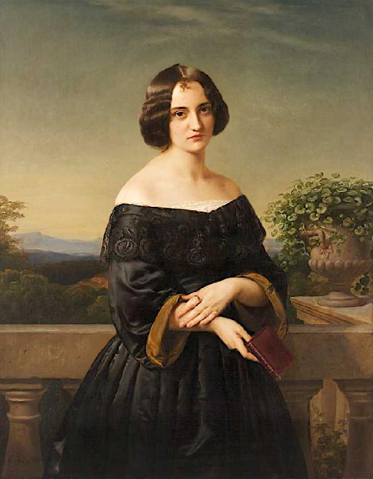
Marie Wiegmann by Karl Ferdinand Sohn, 1843

Marie Elisabeth Wiegmann (7 November 1820 – 4 December 1893) née Hancke, was a German genre and portrait painter who worked in Britain, Germany, and the Netherlands. She studied under artists Karl Ferdinand Sohn and Hermann Stilke. She was a celebrated painter throughout her more than 50-year career.

== Biography ==
Marie Wiegmann was born 7 November 1820 in Silberbeg, Silesia, now modern-day Srebrna Góra, a Polish town in the Lower Silesian Voivodeship.

In 1841, at the age of 21, she became a pupil of Düsseldorf Academy. She studied first under Hermann Stilke, then later under the German artist Karl Ferdinand Sohn, who also illustrated a portrait of her. She was regarded at the time as one of the greatest students of Sohn, and she won a gold medal in Berlin for one of her works. Her portrait of Karl Schnasse was displayed in the National Gallery of Berlin. In 1876, three of her works were established in the National Gallery of Berlin: A Venetian Lady, A Young Girl with Roses, and A French Woman of 1792. She travelled extensively in Germany, England, Holland, and Italy. She later settled with her husband in Düsseldorf, where they had two children: daughter Klara in 1842, and son Arnold in 1846. As she had a fascination with Italian art that she also shared with her husband, she took a study trip there from 1843 to 1845.

From the years to 1846 to 1850, Wiegmann focused on works based on fairytale and mythical stories mostly from late romantic literary models. These included a painting based on the poem "The Elves" by Ludwig Uhland, and various other illustrations that were included in 19th-century poetry books. Two of her illustrations were included in the 1883 St Nicholas: An Illustrated Magazine For Young Folks.

== Gallery ==
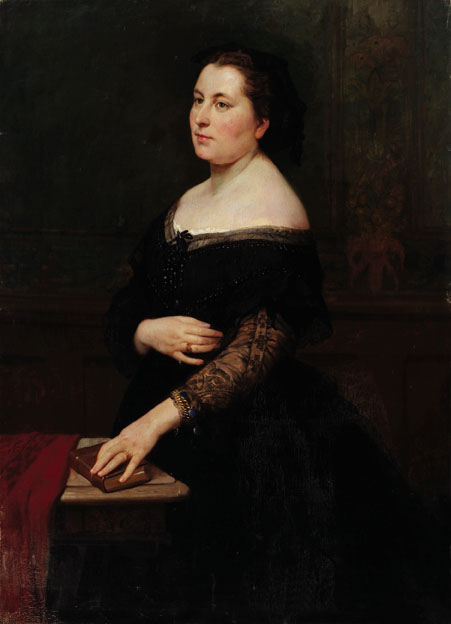
Portrait of Kobiety z Modlitewnikiem, 1864

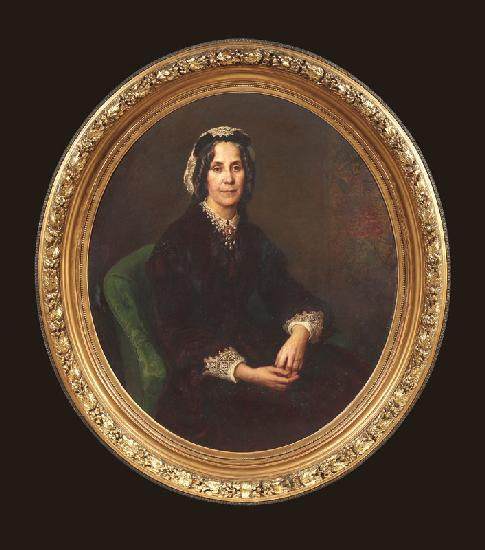
Mrs. Carl vom Rath, mother-in-law of Adolf von Carstanjen, 1866
