= Frederick Vezin =

German painter

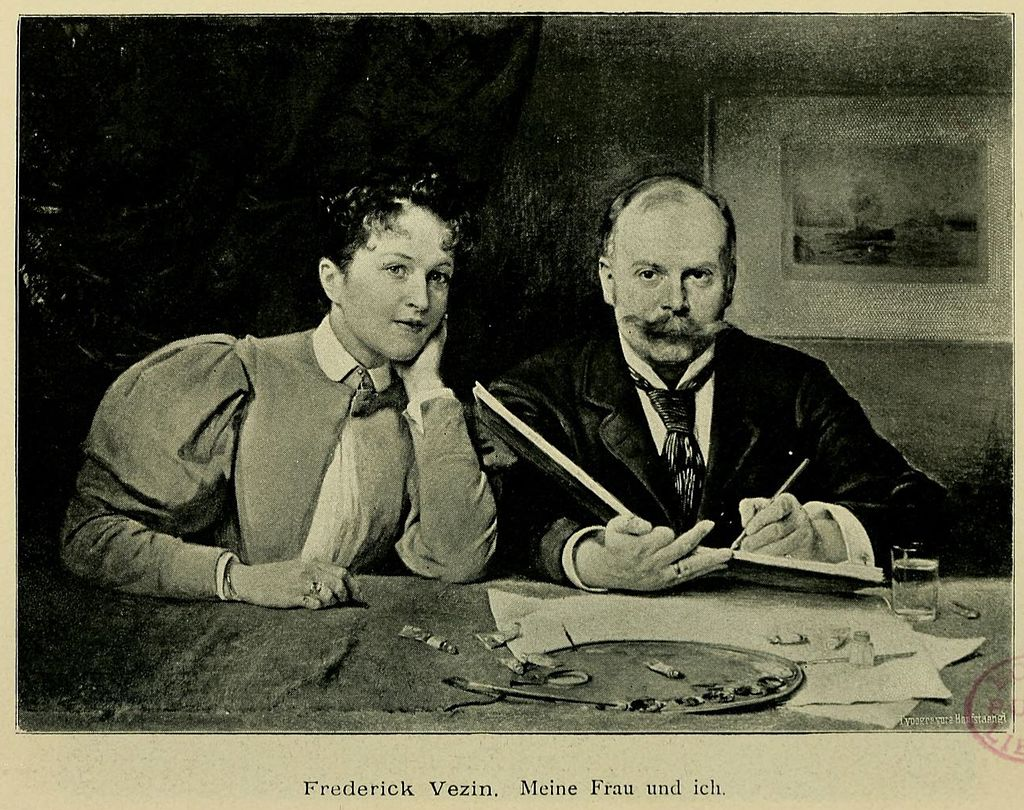
Frederick Vezin and his wife, Ida (1895)

Frederick Vezin also Fred or Frederik (14 August 1859 – 26 December 1933) was an American-born German painter, engraver and lithographer.

== Biography ==
Vezin was born on August 14, 1859, in Torresdale, Philadelphia, Pennsylvania. He was the son of Charles Vezin and Caroline Vezin, née Kalisky.

His family originally came from Saint-Florentin, Yonne in France. According to Richard Böger, Pierre Vezin (1654–1727) was forced to flee after he gave assistance to the Huguenots, even though he was a Catholic. He settled down in Hanover as a viola player. For two generations, the Vezin family lived in Hanover and Osnabrück. In 1813, Charles Henri/Carl Heinrich Vezin (1782–1853), Fredericks grandfather, emigrated to the United States and settled in Philadelphia. The family produced several creative artists in addition to Frederick, including his uncle, the actor Hermann Vezin, and his brother, Charles Vezin (1858–1942), also a painter.

During his childhood and youth, Vezin frequently travelled between Germany and the USA. He attended a school in Berlin and from 1868 to 1871 he attended the Classical Institute in Philadelphia.

In 1876, Frederick decided to return to Germany to study art at the Kunstakademie Düsseldorf, where he studied landscape painting with Georg Heinrich Crola. Later, he studied history painting with Peter Janssen and the Nazarene artist, Karl Müller. He remained at the Academy until 1883; working with Julius Roeting, Eduard von Gebhardt and Wilhelm Sohn. After a stay in Munich, he lived in Düsseldorf from 1895 until his death.

He concentrated on landscapes and genre scenes, mostly depicting high society, although he was also known for portraits. Thanks to the influence of his uncle, Hermann, he was known in England and the United States as well. He had a major showing at the Philadelphia Academy of Fine Arts in 1893. Stylistically, he combines elements of the Düsseldorf School and Impressionism.

== Selected paintings ==
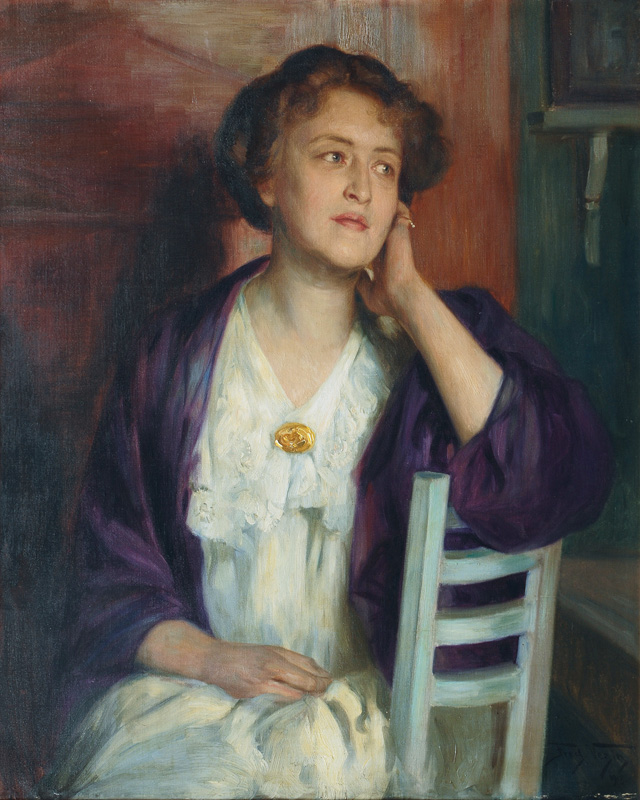
Young Woman in a Lilac Shawl

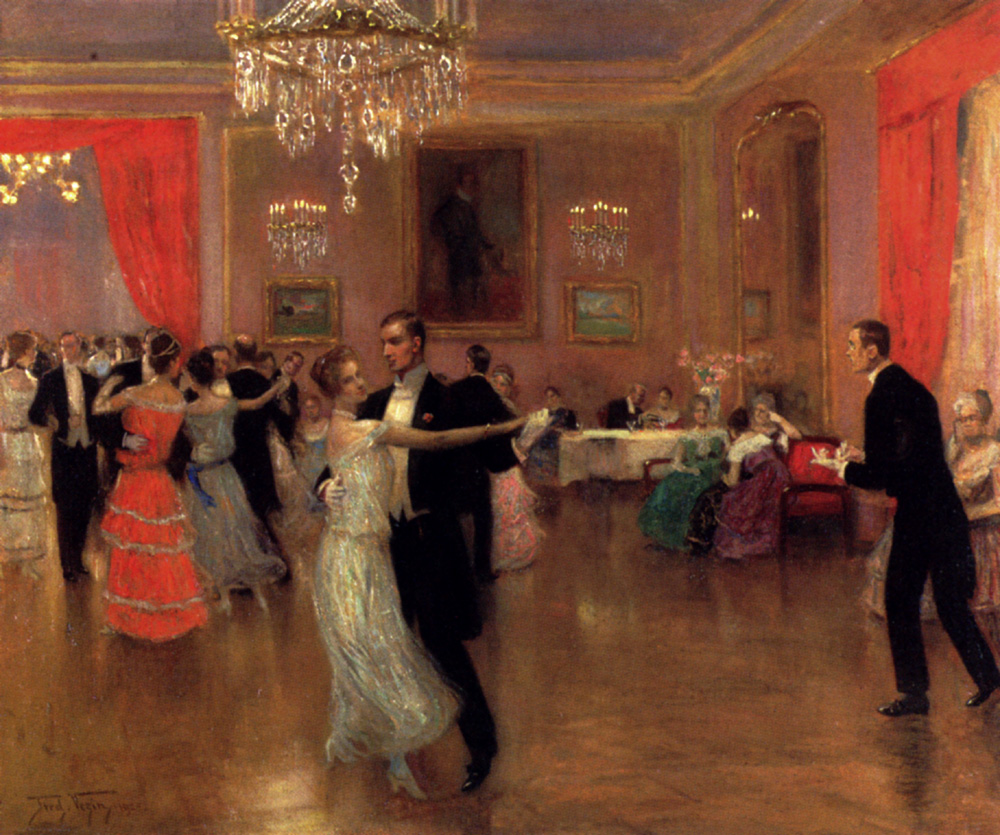
At the Ball

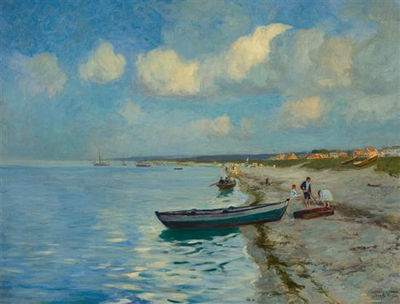
Summer Day on the Beach

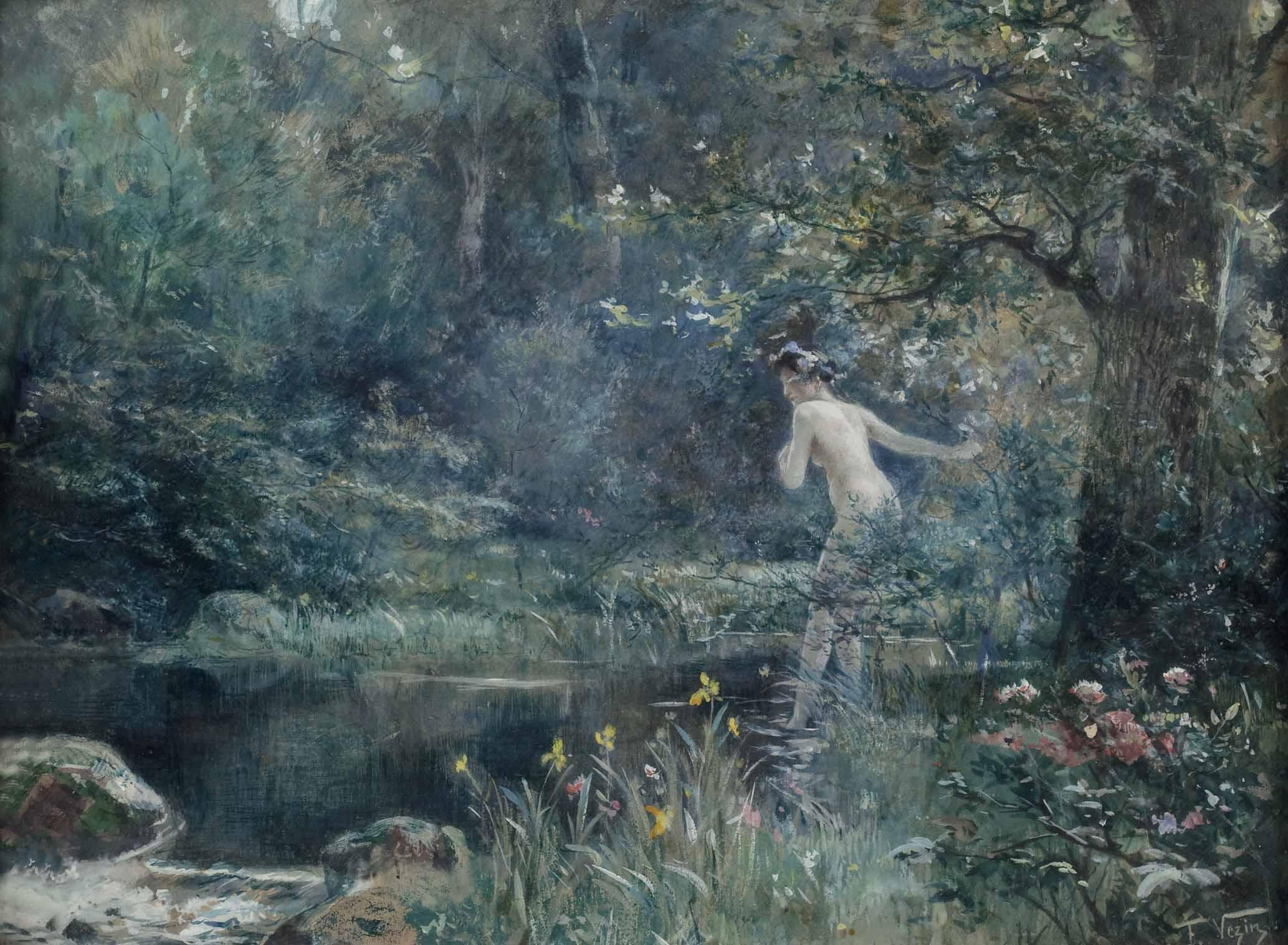
Bather in a Forest Stream

== Sources ==
- (in German) Vezin, Frederik. In: Ulrich Thieme, Felix Becker (editors): Allgemeines Lexikon der Bildenden Künstler von der Antike bis zur Gegenwart. Band 34, E. A. Seemann, Leipzig 1940, S. 318.
- Kunstmuseum Düsseldorf and Galerie Paffrath: Lexikon der Düsseldorfer Malerschule. Vol.3, Bruckmann, Munich 1998 ISBN 978-3-7654-3010-7
- Hermann Vezin: from In the days of my Youth. Containing the Autobiographies of Thirty-Four well-known Men and Women of today. Introduction by T. O'Connor. C. Arthur Pearson, London 1901 (Online)
- Friedrich von Boetticher: Malwerke des 19. Jahrhunderts. II. Band, 2. Hälfte. 1901
