= Vezins =

Vezins or Vézins may refer to the following places in France:

- Vezins, Maine-et-Loire, in the Maine-et-Loire département
- Vezins, a former commune that is now a part of Isigny-le-Buat in the Manche département
- Vézins-de-Lévézou, in the Aveyron département
- Vezins dam, a dismantled dam on the river Sélune

== See also ==
- Vezin, a surname
