= Friedrich Bindewald =

German painter (1862–1940)

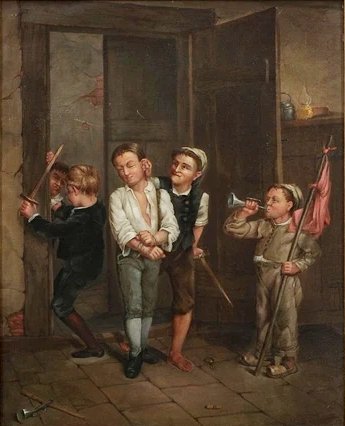
Playing Prisoner

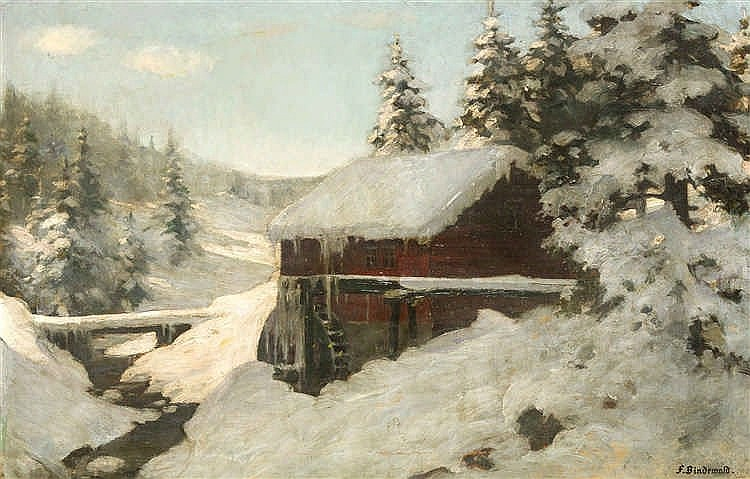
Snowy Alpine Landscape

Friedrich "Fritz" Bindewald (31 January 1862 – 1 February 1940) was a German painter associated with the Düsseldorfer Malerschule, and a member of the Reichstag.

== Life and work ==
He was born in Busenborn, Schotten on 31 January 1862 to Theodor Bindewald, a pastor and writer, and his wife, Luise Christine, née Buff (1832–1913), a great niece of Charlotte Buff. He attended the gymnasium in Laubach from 1875 to 1880, then performed one year of volunteer community service before taking his exams.

From that time until 1888, he was enrolled at the Kunstakademie Düsseldorf, where he studied history painting, anatomical drawing, and perspective. His instructors included Johann Peter Theodor Janssen, Eduard von Gebhardt, Hugo Crola, and Julius Roeting. Until 1890, he was a member of "Tartarus", a nationalistic student organization. From 1888 to 1889, he served a year as a military volunteer, in the 116th Regiment.

After 1889, he was a self-employed genre and landscape painter; with a preference for motifs from the Vogelsberg, the Rhön, and the Bavarian Alps. Later, he became active in the Willingshäuser Artists' Colony.

He was a self-confessed antisemite. From 1893 to 1903, and again from 1907 to 1912, he was a member of the Imperial Reichstag, representing the Grand Duchy of Hesse, for the German Reform Party.

In 1896, he married Martha Lange (1865–1919) from Grimma, the daughter of that city's mayor. Their son, Erwin (1897–1950), was also an artist of some note.

He died on 1 February 1940 in Berlin.
