= Max Volkhart =

German painter (1848–1924)

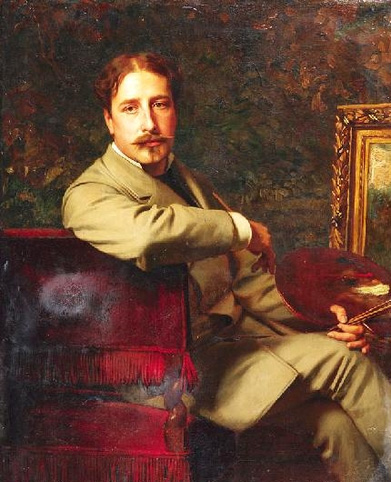
Max Volkhart; portrait by his father-in-law, Julius Roeting (1881)

Max Volkhart (17 October 1848 – 1924) was a German genre painter and etcher; associated with the Düsseldorfer Malerschule. He was heavily influenced by the Dutch Masters, and many of his works are set in the 17th and 18th centuries.

== Biography ==
Volkhart was born in Düsseldorf. His father was the history painter Wilhelm Volkhart, his first teacher. Later, he followed his father's example and enrolled at the Kunstakademie Düsseldorf, where he studied with Heinrich Lauenstein, Andreas Müller and Julius Roeting, whose daughter, Anna, he would later marry. Afterwards, he took private lessons from Eduard von Gebhardt. His first major painting, The Wounded at Gravelotte was inspired by the Franco-Prussian War and was later acquired by Kaiser Wilhelm I.

This period was followed by an extended trip to Belgium and the Netherlands, where he focused on studies from nature. In 1881 at Rotterdam, he presented a Panorama depicting the victory of Maurice, Prince of Orange over the Spaniards at the Battle of Nieuwpoort.

In 1883, he became a member of the "Düsseldorfer Ruderverein 1880" (Rowing association), which had a boathouse in the harbor next to the Kunstakademie, and participated in numerous rowing competitions with some of his fellow artists.

He was also a member of "Malkasten", a progressive artists' association that grew out of the Revolution of 1848. He participated in many of their regular festivities, which included an annual masked ball, and directed their "Doppelhochzeitsfeier" (Double wedding) in 1898.

In his later years, he apparently faded into obscurity, as the exact date of his death seems to have been unrecorded and several sources give his year of death as 1935, rather than 1924. He died in Düsseldorf.

== Selected paintings ==
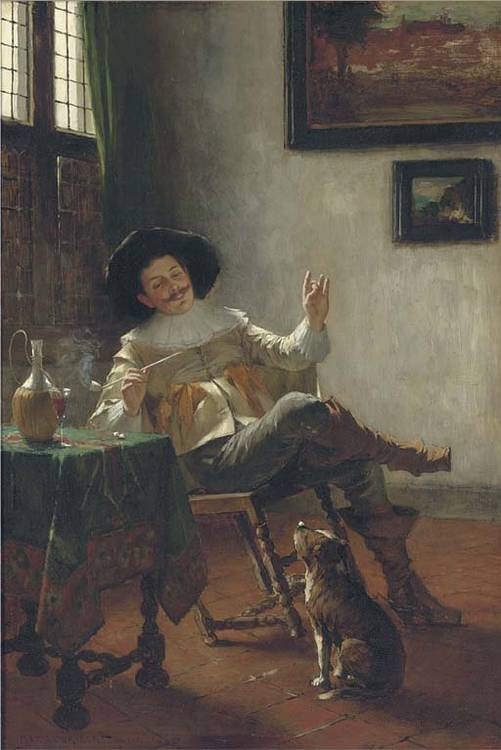
His Master's Voice

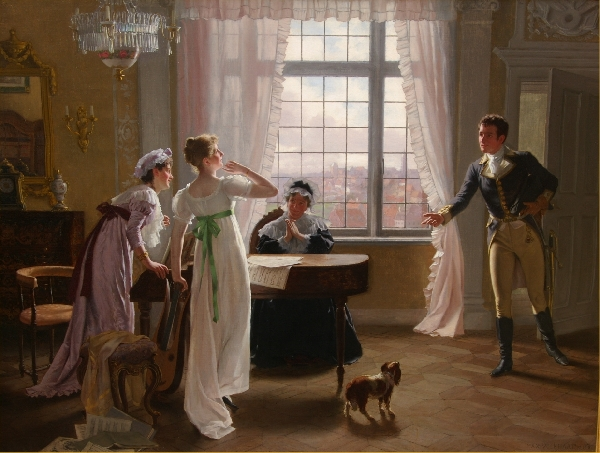
The Surprise Visit

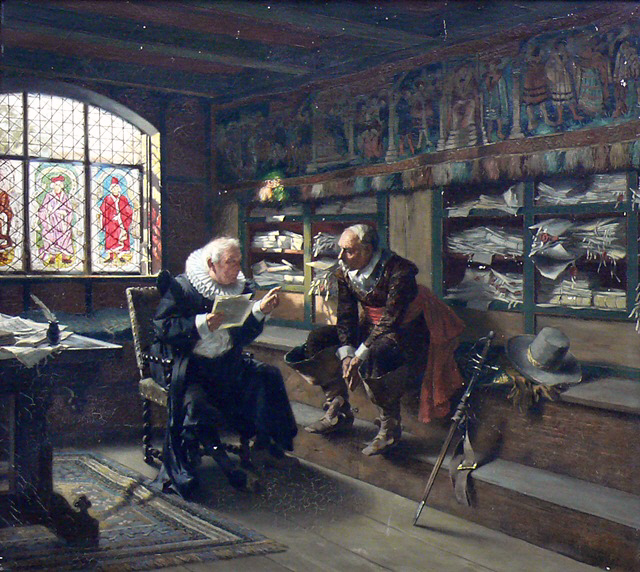
The Notary

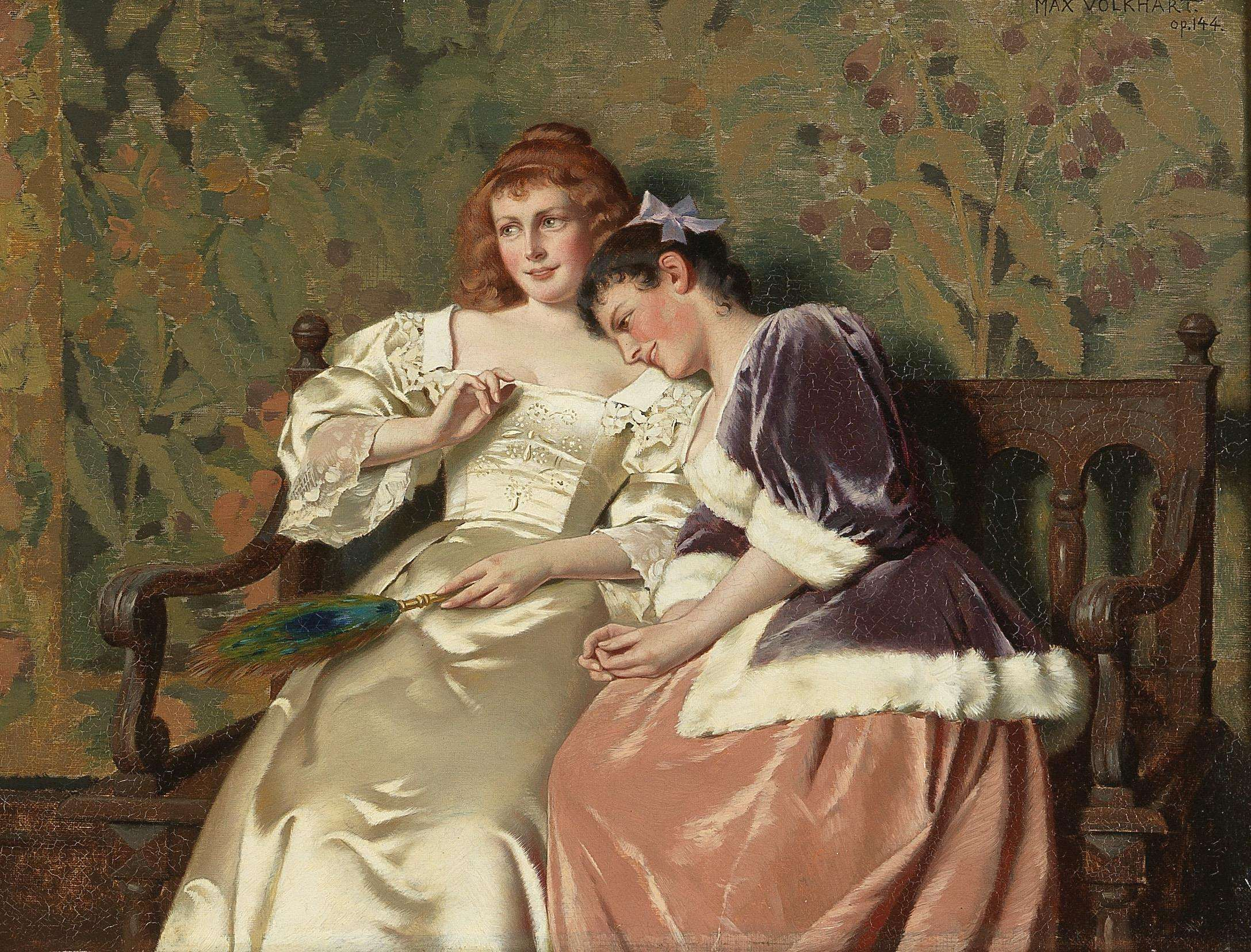
Two Friends

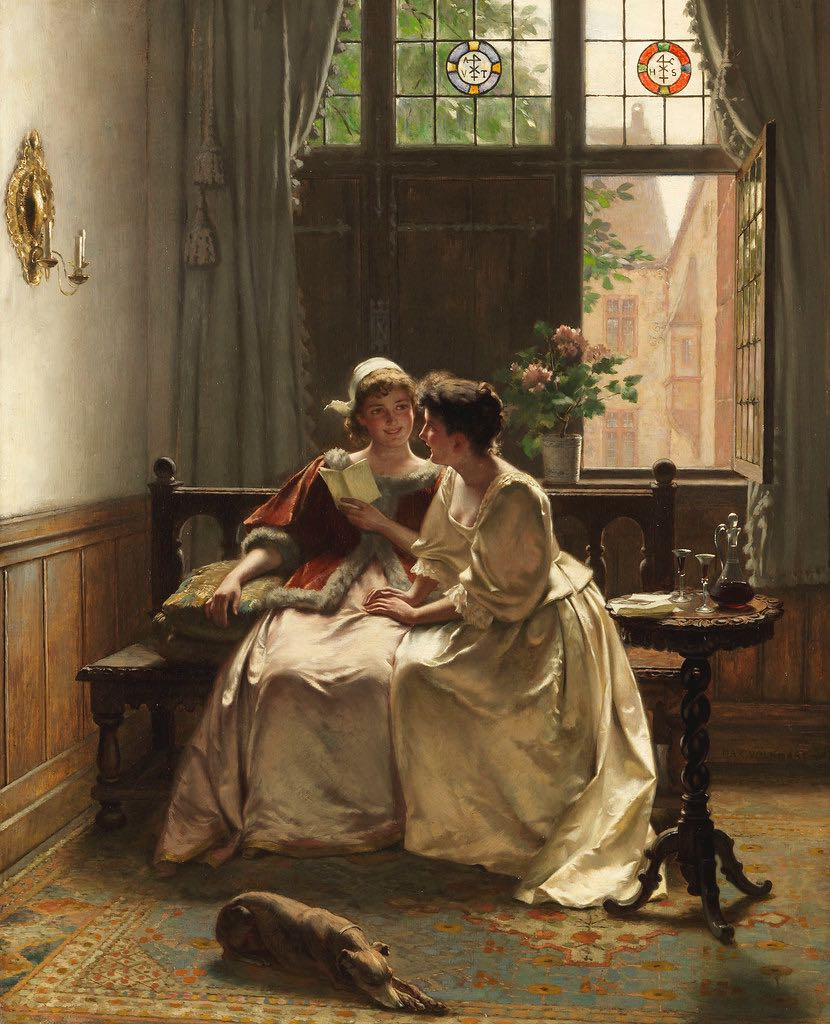
Good News
