= Christian Ludwig Bokelmann =

German painter

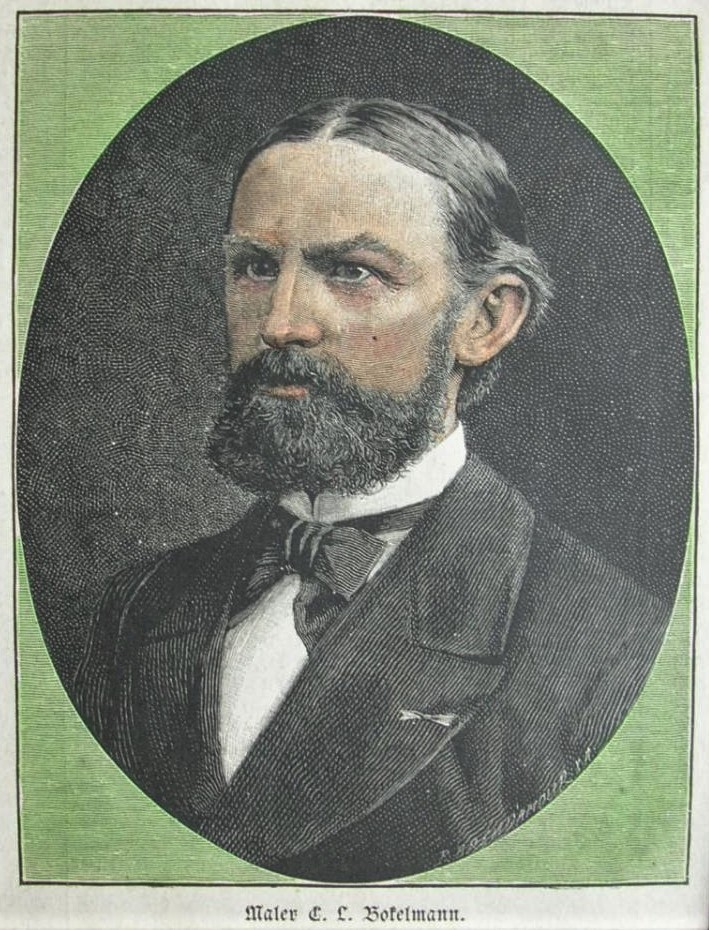
Christian Bokelmann, by Richard Brend'amour (1878)

Christian Ludwig Bokelmann (4 February 1844 – 14 May 1894) was a German genre painter in the Realistic and Naturalistic styles; associated with the Düsseldorfer Malerschule.

== Biography ==
He was born in St. Jürgen, near Bremen. His father was a teacher and organist. At the request of his parents, he studied business in Lüneburg and Hamburg-Harburg, with the aim of becoming a merchant. He worked in a cigar factory first, then a comb factory. After his father's death in 1868, he followed his true inclinations and enrolled at the Kunstakademie Düsseldorf, where he studied with Ludwig Knaus until 1871. After that, he took private lessons from Wilhelm Sohn.

In 1873, he had his first major showing at the World Exposition in Vienna and, the following year, began exhibiting regularly at the Prussian Academy of Arts. In 1877, he was awarded a gold medal at an exhibition in Ghent. During the 1880s, he undertook an extensive study trip through the marshlands of North Friesland; inspired by the "Volkskunde" (ethnographic) approach to painting, pioneered by Rudolf Jordan. In 1883, he became associated with the artists' colony at Katwijk.

From 1892 to 1893, he worked as a professor of genre painting at the Academy of Fine Arts, Karlsruhe, then transferred to the Berlin University of the Arts. In both positions, his friend, Fritz Mackensen, served as his personal assistant. He also became a member of "Malkasten", a progressive art society in Düsseldorf, and the Prussian Academy.

He died in 1894 in Berlin after falling off a ladder in his studio, while attempting to hang a laurel wreath that had been given to him by his students on the occasion of his 50th birthday.

== Selected paintings ==
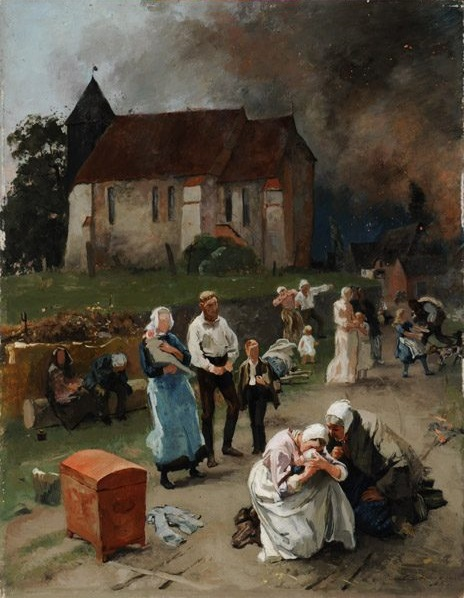
Fire in the Village

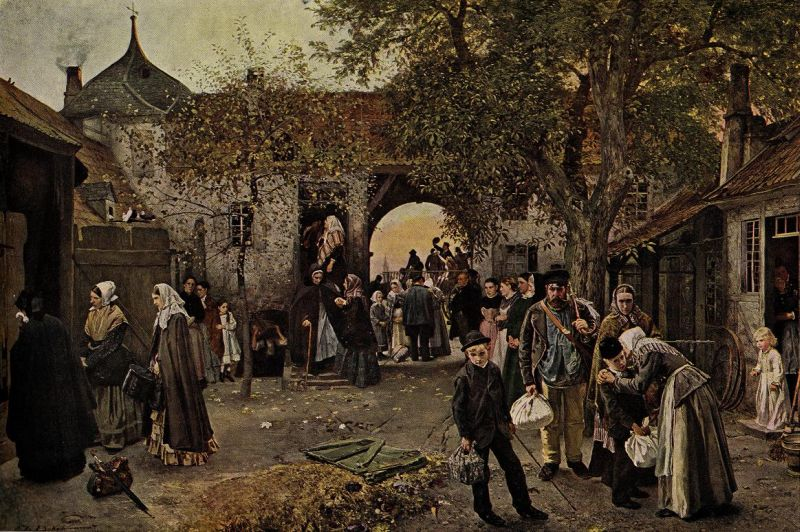
Farewell to the Emigrants

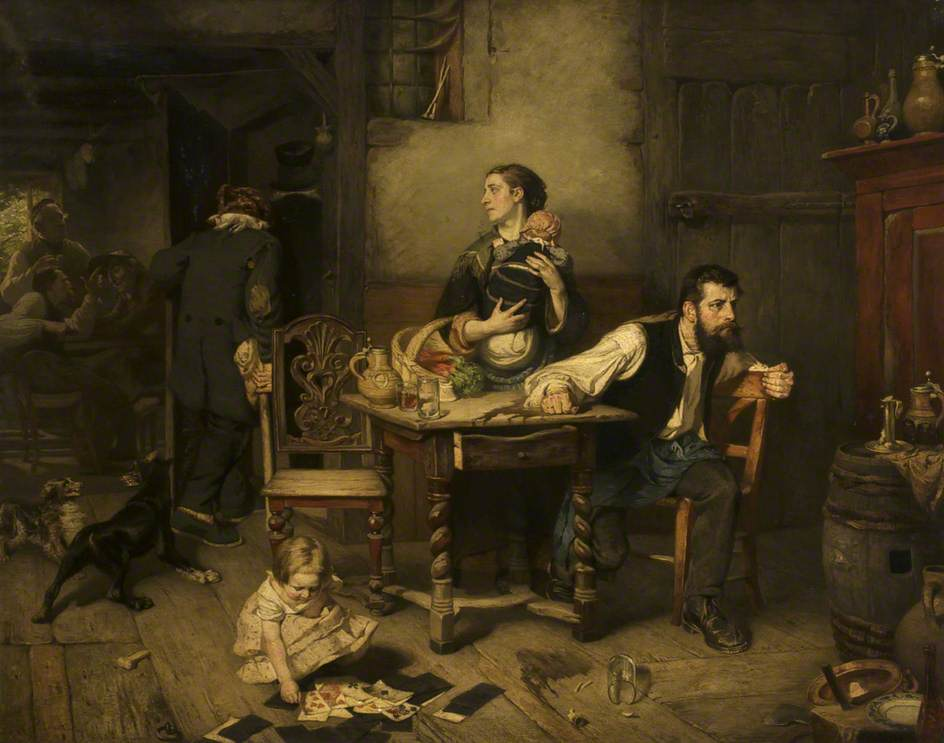
The Gambler

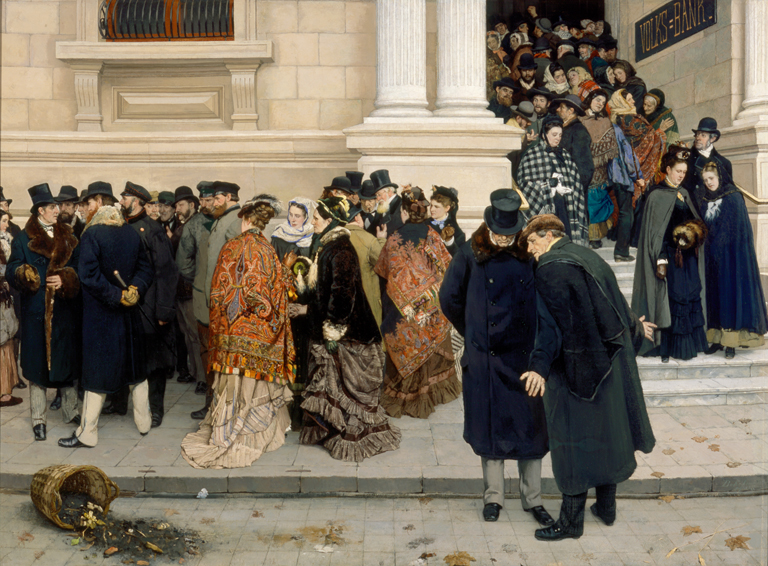
The Volksbank,
Shortly Before the Crash
