= Nordstemmen =

- Municipality
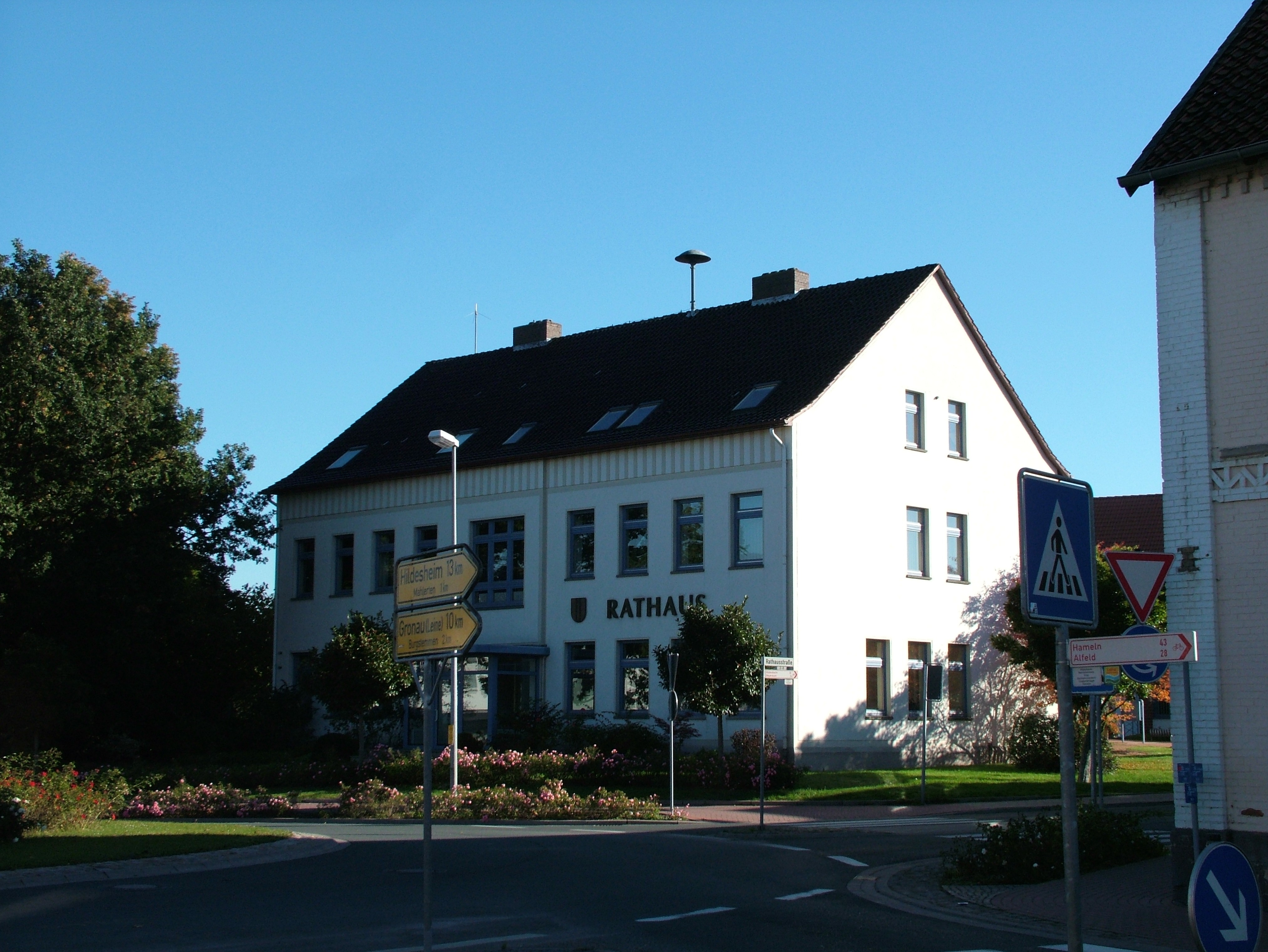
- Town hall

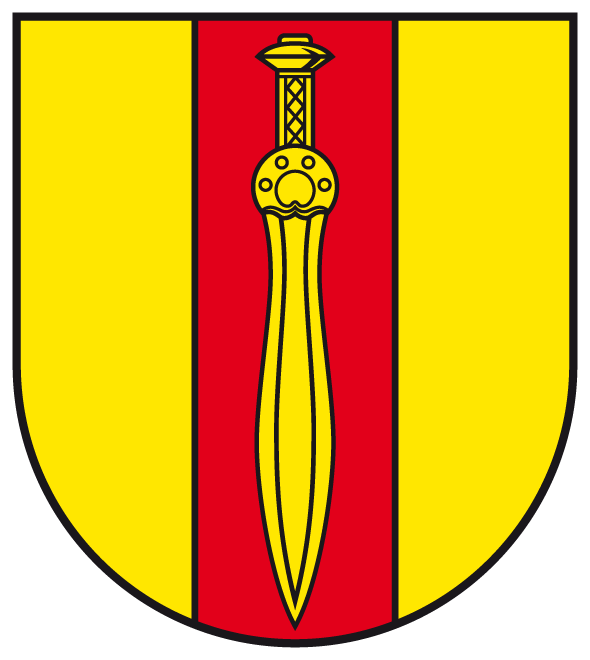
- Coat of arms

- Location of Nordstemmen within Hildesheim district
- Interactive map of Nordstemmen
- Location within Germany Location within Lower Saxony
- Coordinates: 52°10′N 9°46′E
- Country: Germany
- State: Lower Saxony
- District: Hildesheim
- Subdivisions: 9 Ortsteile

Government
  - Mayor (2020–25): Nicole Dombrowski (Ind.)

Area
  - Total: 60.17 km^{2} (23.23 sq mi)
- Elevation: 64 m (210 ft)

Population (2025-12-31)
  - Total: 11,800
  - Density: 196/km^{2} (508/sq mi)
- Time zone: UTC+01:00 (CET)
  - Summer (DST): UTC+02:00 (CEST)
- Postal codes: 31171
- Dialling codes: 05069
- Vehicle registration: HI
- Website: www.nordstemmen.de

Nordstemmen is a village and a municipality in the district of Hildesheim, in Lower Saxony, Germany. It is situated on the river Leine, approx. 10 km west of Hildesheim, and 25 km south of Hannover.

== Subdivision ==
Besides Nordstemmen proper, the municipality consists of the villages of Adensen, Barnten, Burgstemmen, Groß Escherde, Hallerburg, Heyersum, Klein Escherde, Mahlerten and Rössing.

== Mayor ==
The mayor is Nicole Dombrowski (independent), she was elected in September 2020.

== Personalities ==
- Rudolf Wiegmann (1804–1865), architect, painter and professor at the Kunstakademie Düsseldorf
