= Jane Vezin =

British actress (1829–1902)

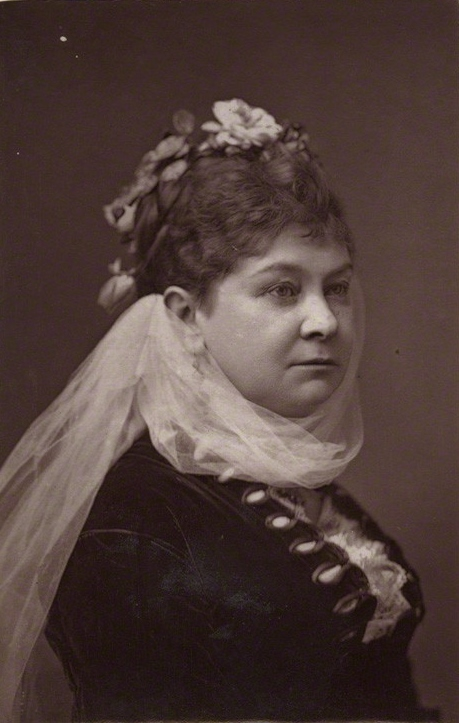
- Born: Jane Elizabeth Thomson; 24 February 1829; Bath, Somerset, England
- Died: 17 April 1902 (aged 73); Margate, Kent, England
- Resting place: Highgate Cemetery
- Occupation: Stage actor
- Years active: 1845–1883
- Spouses: Charles Frederick Young (m. 1846; div. 1862); Hermann Vezin (m. 1863)
- Children: 1

Jane Elizabeth Vezin (née Thomson; 24 February 1829 – 17 April 1902) was a British actress.

== Life ==
She was born while her mother was on tour in England in 1829. She was the daughter of George Thomson, merchant, by his wife Peggy Cook, an actress, whose aunt, Sarah West, enjoyed a high position on the stage. At an early age, she accompanied her parents to Australia, and at eight, as a child singer and dancer, earned a reputation as a prodigy. In 1845, she was playing at the Victoria Theatre, Melbourne. In June 1846, at Trinity Church, Launceston, Tasmania, she was married to Charles Frederick Young, a comedian. She supported G. V. Brooke, the well-known actor, during his Australian tour of 1855, appearing with him as Beatrice in Much Ado About Nothing, Emilia in Othello, Pauline in The Lady of Lyons, and Lady Macbeth.

== Early career ==
As Mrs. Charles Young, she made her first appearance on the London stage under the management of Samuel Phelps, at Sadler's Wells Theatre, on 15 September 1857, playing Julia in The Hunchback. She was welcomed with enthusiasm as an accomplished interpreter of the poetic and romantic drama. During the seasons of 1857 and 1858, she played most of the leading parts in Phelps's productions, making striking successes as the Princess of France in Love's Labour's Lost, Rosalind in As You Like It, Clara Douglas in Money, Portia, Desdemona, Fanny Stirling in The Clandestine Marriage, Imogen, Cordelia, Mrs. Haller in The Stranger, Mistress Ford in The Merry Wives of Windsor, Lydia Languish in The Rivals, Lady Mabel Lynteme in Westland Marston's The Patrician's Daughter, Pauline in The Lady of Lyons, Virginia in Virginius, Mrs. Oakley in George Cohnan's The Jealous Wife, Lady Townley in Vanbrugh and Cibber's The Provoked Husband, Viola in Twelfth Night, Constance in King John, and Juliet.

During the summer vacation of 1858 she had appeared at the Haymarket Theatre, and Lyceum Theatre, playing at the former house the Widow Belmour in Murphy's The Way to Keep Him on 10 July, the last night of Buckstone's five years continuous "season".

In March 1859, she appeared at the Lyceum under Benjamin Webster and Edmund Falconer. At the opening of the Princess's Theatre under the management of Augustus Harris, senior (24 September), she rendered Amoret in Ivy Hall, adapted by John Oxenford from Le Roman d'un Jeune Homme Pauvre; Henry Irving made his first appearance on the London stage on this occasion. Mien Phelps reopened Sadler's Wells Theatre, under his sole management, on 8 Sept. 1860, Mrs. Young appeared as Rosalind, acting for the first time with Hermann Vezin [q. v. Suppl. II], who appeared as Orlando. She remained with Phelps through the season of 1860–61, adding the parts of Miranda in The Tempest and Donna Violante in The Wonder to her repertory. Her chief engagement during 1861 was at the Haymarket Theatre, where on 30 September she played Portia to the Shylock of the American actor Edwin Booth, who then made his first appearance in London.

In May 1862 she obtained a divorce from Young, and on 21 February 1863, at St Peter's Church, Eaton Square, she was married to Hermann Vezin, whom she at once accompanied on a theatrical tour in the provinces. Afterwards she played with him in Westland Marston's Donna Diana at the Princess's Theatre on 2 January 1864. On the tercentenary celebration of Shakespeare's birthday at Stratford-on-Avon, in April 1864, she acted Rosalind. There followed a long engagement at Drury Lane Theatre, under F. B. Chatterton and Edmund Falconer. There she first appeared on 8 October 1864 as Desdemona, in a powerful cast which included Phelps as Othello and William Creswick as Iago. She repeated many of the chief parts she had already played at Sadler's Wells, adding to them the Lady in Milton's Comus (17 April 1865), Marguerite in Bayle Bernard's Faust (20 October 1866), in which she made a great hit; Helen in The Hunchback, with Helen Faucit as Julia (November 1866); and Lady Teazle in The School for Scandal (4 March 1867). At the Princess's Theatre, on 22 August 1867, she gave a very beautiful performance of the part of Peg Woffington in Charles Reade's Masks and Faces. Again with Phelps at Drury Lane, during the season of 1867–68, she played Lady Macbeth (14 October 1867); Angiolina in The Doge of Venice (2 November); and Charlotte in The Hypocrite (1 February 1868).

Less important London engagements followed: at the St. James's Theatre, on 15 October 1870, she was highly successful as Clotilde in Fernande, adapted from the French by Henry Sutherland Edwards, and on 4 March 1871 as Mrs. Arthur Minton in James Albery's comedy, Two Thorns.

== Tours ==
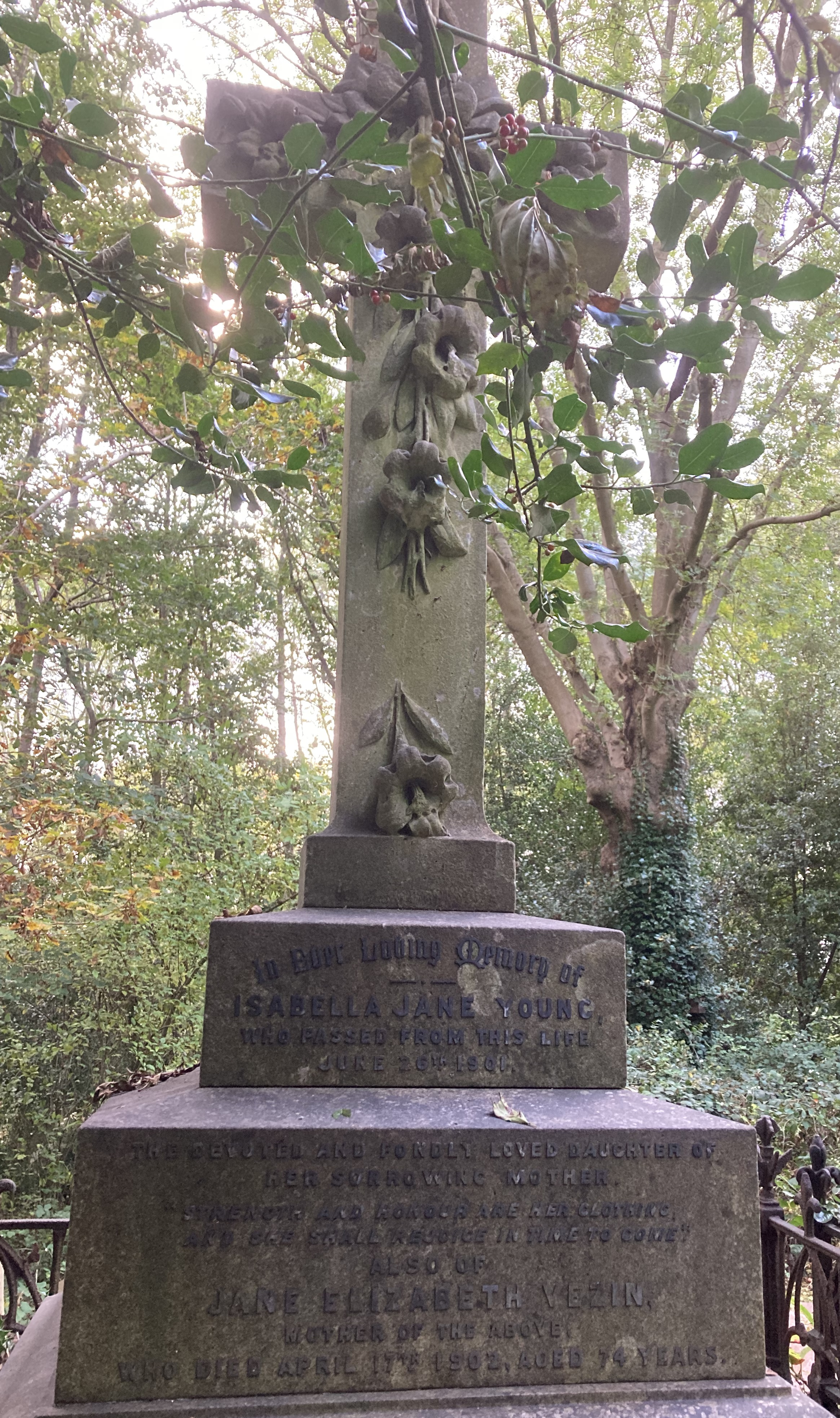
Family vault of Jane Elizabeth Vezin in Highgate Cemetery

During March 1874 she toured in the chief provincial cities with her own company, playing parts of no great interest. At Drury Lane Theatre she reappeared under F. B. Chatterton as Lady Elizabeth in Richard III (Cibber's version) (23 September 1876), as Lady Macbeth (22 November), as Paulina in The Winter's Tale, with Charles Dillon (28 September 1878), and later in the season as Emilia in Othello and as Mrs. Oakley in The Jealous Wife. She subsequently joined the company at the Prince of Wales's Theatre in Tottenham Court Road, under the management of the Bancrofts, appearing on 27 September 1879 as Lady Deene in James Albery's Duty, an adaptation from Sardou's Les Bourgeois de Pont Arcy. She again supported Edwin Booth at the Princess's Theatre on 6 Nov. 1880, as the Queen in Hamlet; on 27 December as Francesca Bentivoglio in The Fool's Revenge; and on 17 January 1881 as Emilia in Othello.

After playing at the Adelphi Theatre, Olga Strogoff in H. J. Byron's Michael Strogoff (14 March 1881), she fulfilled her last professional engagement at the St. James's Theatre, under the management of Messrs. Hare and Kendal on 20 October 1883, when she effectively acted Mrs. Rogers in William Gillette and Mrs. Hodgson Burnett's Young Folks' Ways.

The death of her only daughter, Isabella, (by her first marriage) in 1901 unhinged her mind. At Margate, on 17 April 1902, she eluded the vigilance of her nurses, and flung herself from her bedroom window, with fatal result. She was buried in a family vault on the western side of Highgate Cemetery.

== Sources ==
- Gilliland, J. (2004). "Oxford Dictionary of National Biography". Oxford Dictionary of National Biography (online ed.). Oxford University Press. doi:10.1093/ref:odnb/36649. (Subscription, Wikipedia Library access or UK public library membership required.)
