= Charles Vezin =

American painter

- Born: 9 April 1858; Philadelphia, Pennsylvania, U.S.
- Died: 13 March 1942 (aged 83); Coral Gables, Florida, U.S.
- Occupation: Painter
- Children: 2 sons, 2 daughters
- Relatives: Frederick Vezin, brother

Charles Vezin (9 April 1858, Philadelphia, Pennsylvania – 13 March 1942, Coral Gables, Florida) was an American painter.

== Life ==
Vezin was born on April 9, 1858, in Philadelphia, Pennsylvania. He was the son of Charles Vezin and Caroline Vezin, née Kalisky. His younger brother was the painter Frederick Vezin.

On 14 June 1883 he married Adah Delamater (1858–1930) in New York City.

Vezin became a painter at the age of 40. He exhibited his work at the Academy of Fine Arts, the National Academy of Design, and the Corcoran Gallery. He was the president of the Art Students League of New York and the Salmagundi Club.

In 1914, he published an essay in the Brooklyn Eagle that was intended to convince the U.S. of the German viewpoint in World War I.

Vezin had two sons and two daughters. He died on March 13, 1942, in Coral Gables, Florida, at age 83.
