= August Lemmer =

German painter

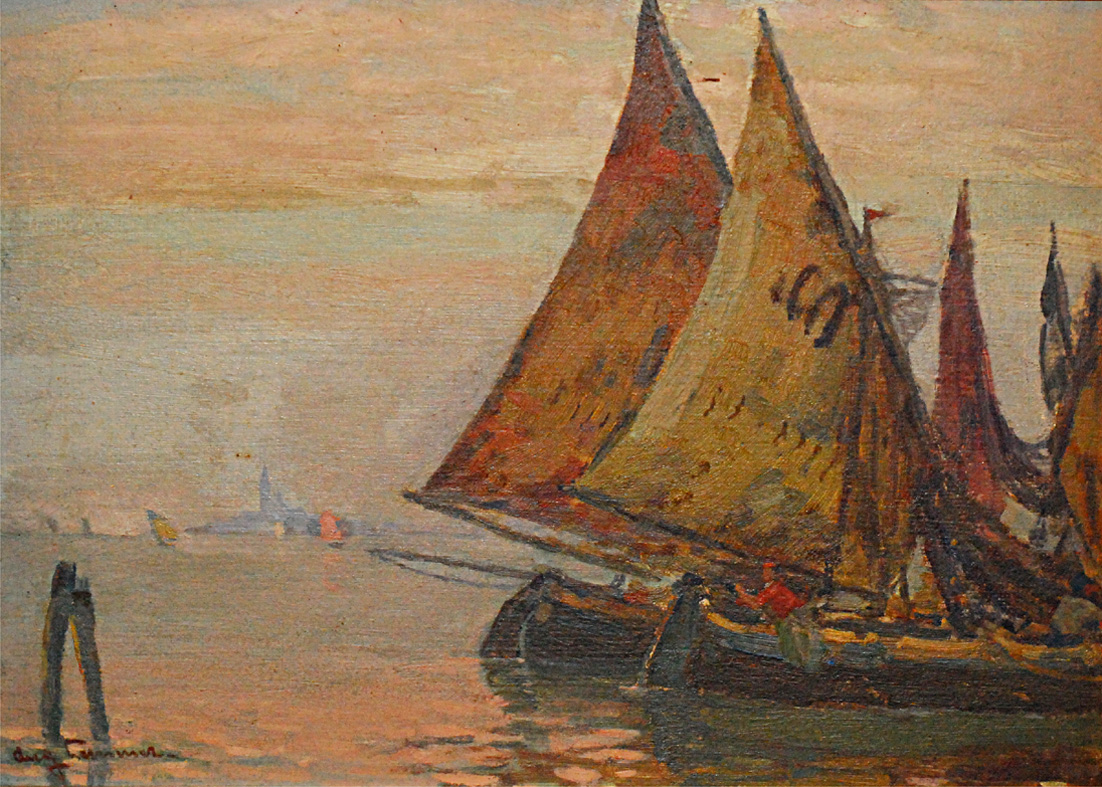
Segelschiffe vor Venedig, c. 1900

August Lemmer (1862 – date of death unknown) was a German artist.

Lemmer was born in Deutz, Rhenish Prussia. After studying at the art academy of Karlsruhe from 1888–92 he remained in the capital of the Grand Duchy of Baden.

Lemmer made his name as a painter of impressionistic landscape, seascape, and city views. Numerous paintings of Lemmer's date from the late 19th and early 20th centuries. He often painted images of Carniola, Trieste, Venice, and German cities such as Munich. Lemmer also often painted images of fishing boats off the coast of Venice.

August Lemmer’s works have appeared at public auction on 69 occasions, predominantly in the painting category.
