= Wilhelm Sohn =

German painter

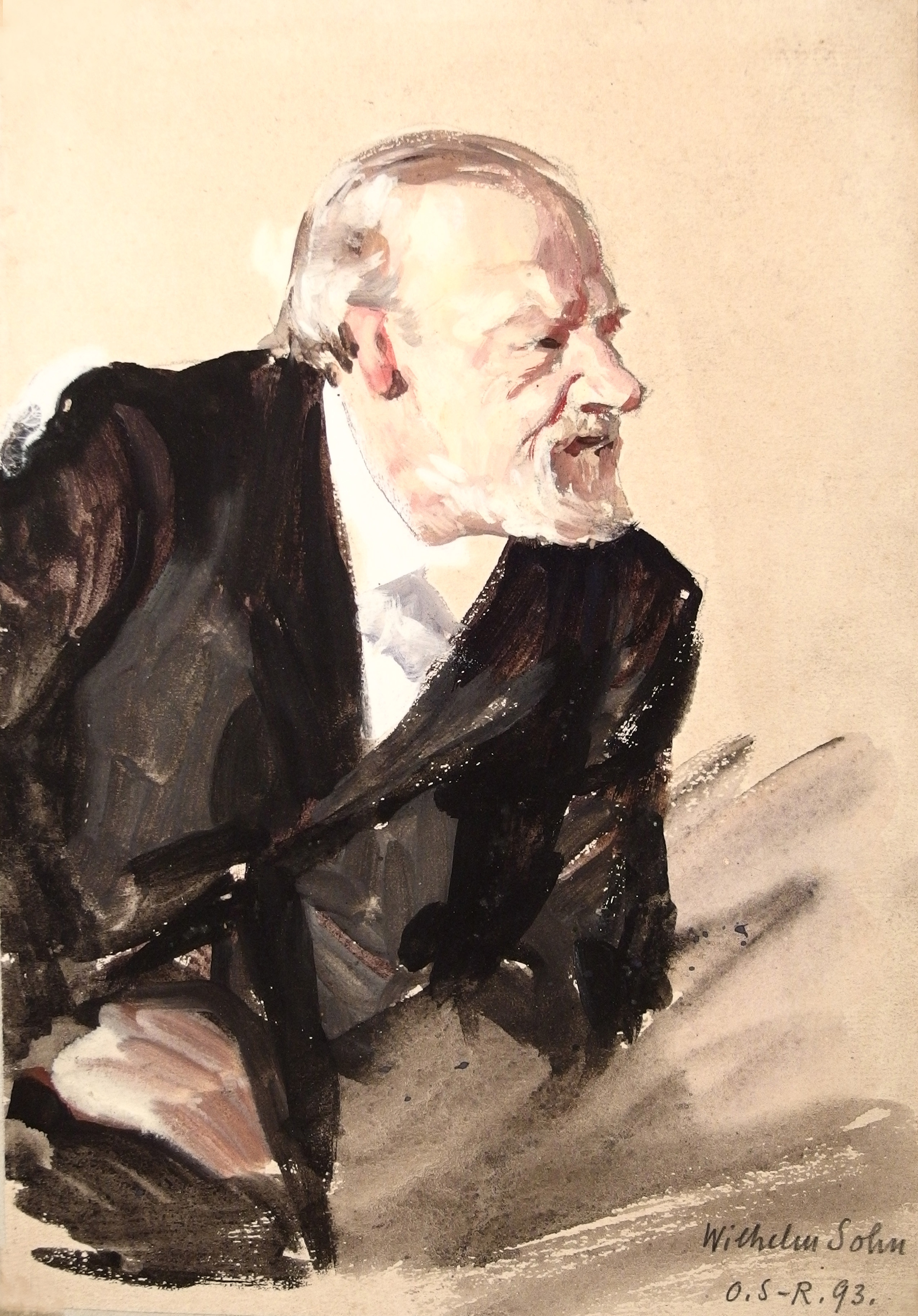
Wilhelm Sohn; portrait by his cousin Otto Sohn-Rethel (1893)

Johann August Wilhelm Sohn (29 August 1829 – 16 March 1899) was a German genre painter and art professor.

== Life ==
Johann August Wilhelm Sohn was born 29 August 1829, in Berlin, Germany. In 1847, he went to Düsseldorf, where he studied at the Kunstakademie Düsseldorf (Düsseldorf Art Academy) with Rudolf Wiegmann, Theodor Hildebrandt, Wilhelm von Schadow and his uncle, Karl Ferdinand Sohn. After that, he supplemented his studies by traveling extensively. In 1861, he married his cousin, Sophie Emilie (Emmy) Sohn, making Karl Ferdinand his uncle and father-in-law.

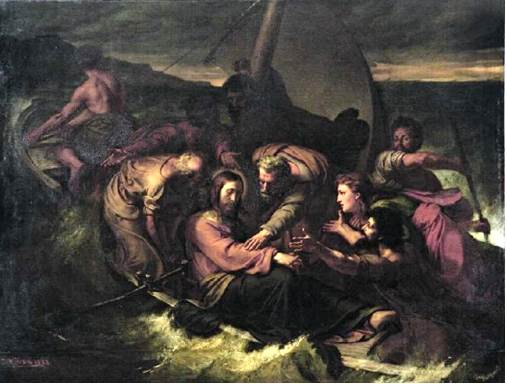
Christ on the Stormy Waters

In keeping with the spirit of the Düsseldorf school of painting, he began by painting Biblical history scenes; notably "Christ on the Stormy Waters". Several works on religious themes remained unfinished, as he discovered the Dutch Masters and turned to genre painting. Although Naturalism began to establish itself as an art style following the German revolutions of 1848–49, conservative styles remained in force at the Kunstakademie Düsseldorf, until Schadow was ousted as Director in 1859. At that time, Sohn became one of the first to teach the new styles, and was named the first Professor of Genre Painting in 1874 (a position he had declined in 1867).

His new duties kept him so busy, he was unable to finish a commission for a monumental painting from the National Gallery, which he worked on intermittently for 30 years. Despite this heavy schedule, he also presided over a popular painting school for women.

In 1885, his wife Emmy had a stroke while they were on an evening walk and died later that day. Not long after, his son fell ill with a brain disorder that eventually left him paralyzed. In 1895, he resigned his Professorship, moved to Pützchen, near Bonn, to look after his son. He died in Pützchen four years later, on 16 March 1899.

== Works ==
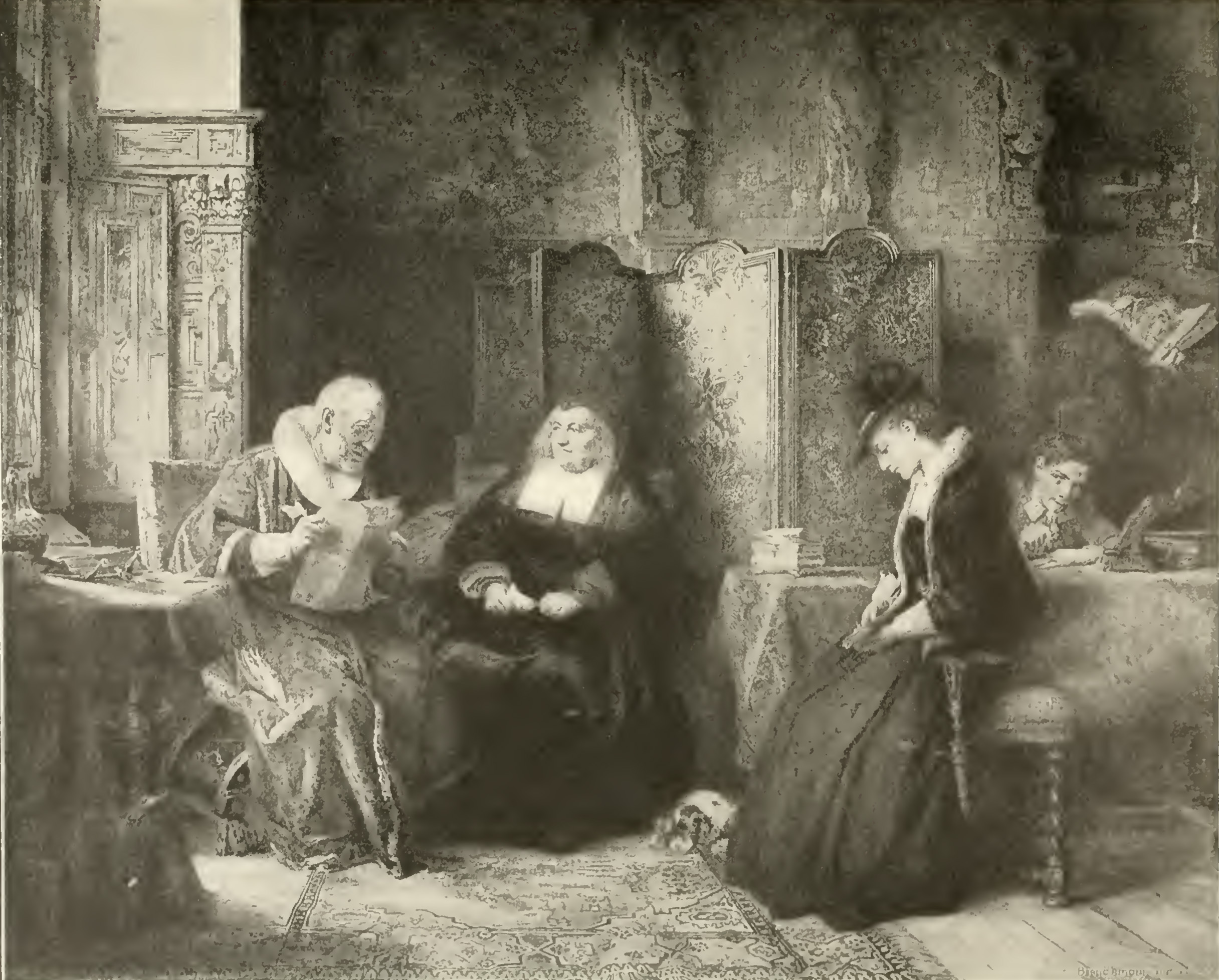
Die Konsultation beim Rechtsanwalt, 1866

- Die Konsultation beim Rechtsanwalt (Consultation with the Lawyer), 1866. Wilhelm Wolfsohn writes about this picture in 1866: "In addition to the paintings which I then noted, a "Consultation with the Advocate "by Wilhelm Sohn, in the style of the 17th century, attracts attention. The figures are of great, poignant truth: an old lady, who asks for an advocate to settle an inheritance dispute, but does not receive the one she wishes. It is uncertain how the young girl dressed in black, with a lovely, bashful face, is related to the older couple. The fine, careful treatment reminds one of the best Dutch painters; If the artist has not yet advanced to complete freedom and mastery of technique, the composition, the expression of the faces and the manner of painting reveals an extraordinary talent."

== Notable students ==
- Agnes Börjesson
- Christian Ludwig Bokelmann
- Hans Dahl
- Karl Rudolf Sohn
- Frederick Vezin
- Hugo Vogel
