= Hermann Vezin =

19th/20th-century American actor

- Hermann Vezin in 1907
- Born: March 2, 1829; Philadelphia, Pennsylvania, US
- Died: June 12, 1910 (aged 81); London, England
- Education: University of Pennsylvania (A.B., M.A.)
- Occupations: Stage actor, Elocution teacher, writer
- Years active: 1850–1910 (60 years)
- Spouse: Jane Vezin

Hermann Vezin (March 2, 1829 – June 12, 1910) was an American actor, teacher of elocution and writer. He was born in Philadelphia, Pennsylvania, and educated at the University of Pennsylvania.

== Life and work ==
Vezin was born in Philadelphia, Pennsylvania, the son of Charles Henri/Carl Heinrich Vezin (1782–1853), a German merchant of French heritage, and his wife Emilie, née Kalinsky (1804–1858). His great-great-grandfather Pierre (de) Vezin (1654-1727) was married on the 14th August 1689 in Hanover to the seventeenth-century French actress Marie Charlotte Pâtissier de Châteauneuf (1672-1729). Rouget de Lisle, the composer of the French national anthem, "La Marseillaise," was one of his distant cousins. After studying law for several years, Vezin graduated from the University of Pennsylvania with an A.B. in 1847 and later a master's degree in 1850.

Despite resistance from his family, Vezin was determined to work as an actor and departed America for the UK shortly after graduation. He made his first appearance at the York Theatre Royal in St Leonard's Place, York, England. After playing minor roles in several provincial engagements, he began performing leading characters as Cardinal Richelieu, Sir Edward Mortimer, Claude Melnotte, and Young Norval. He made his London début in 1852 at the Princess's Theatre. On February 21, 1863, at St Peter's Church, Eaton Square, he married the former child actress, English-born Jane Elizabeth Thompson who, appearing as an adult under the name Mrs. Charles Young, had made a reputation as an actress both in Australia and in England. They appeared in many plays with together until her death in 1902. Together they had a son, the silent film actor, Arthur Vezin.

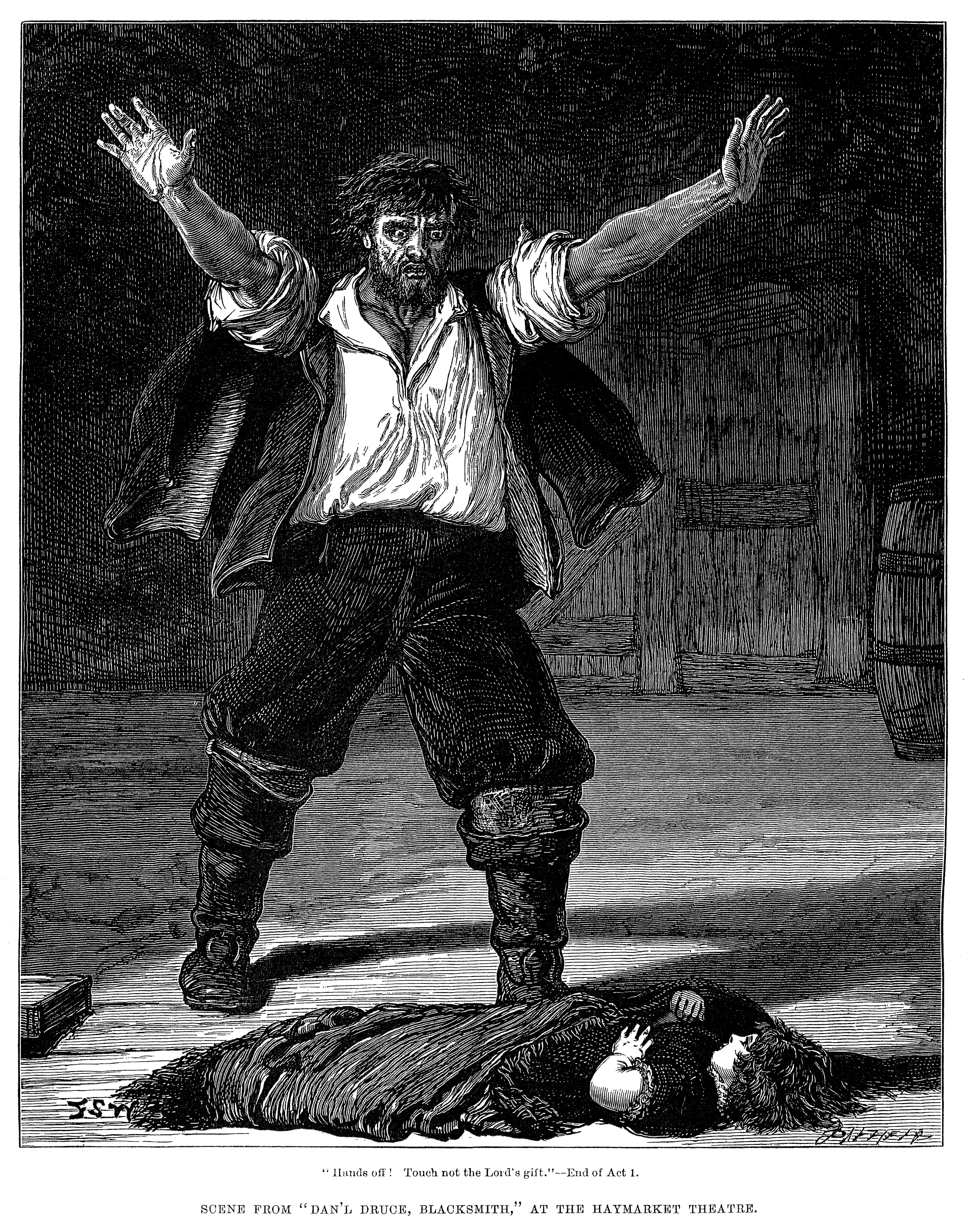
Vezin in the title role of W. S. Gilbert's Dan'l Druce, Blacksmith (1876)

Apart from a brief professional tour of the United States in 1857–58, the majority of Vezin's acting career took place on the English stage. Though primarily an actor, in 1866 he collaborated with the playwrights W. G. Wills and James Albery to write the vaudeville inspired play Doctor Davey based on the 1842 play Le Docteur Robin by French writer Jules de Prémaray in which he also played the title role. The following year he starred as a troubled Scottish poet James Harebell in Wills' Man o' Airlie (1867) to overwhelmingly positive reviews. Vezin followed up with other successful showings, such as The Turn of the Tide by F. C. Burnand (1869), Son of the Soil (1872); As You Like It (1875); and W. S. Gilbert's Dan'l Druce, Blacksmith, which ran for one hundred and nineteen performances at the Haymarket Theatre (1876, also a revival in 1884); He acted with Charles Fechter, Samuel Phelps, Henry Irving, and in 1878 played Dr. Primrose alongside actress Ellen Terry in Wills' Olivia, Vicar of Wakefield (1878), a highly successful adaptation of Oliver Goldsmith's novel, The Vicar of Wakefield (1766).

Sir J. Forbes-Robertson described Vezin in the London Post as a "bright and dapper little man, who was both "learned and dictatorial on the art of acting." The Illustrated London News review of Vezin in the title role of Dan'l Druce, Blacksmith noted that "Mr. Vezin is probably the most intellectual of our actors, and is the very man for creating an original part, such as that of Dan'l Druce" and described one scene as "an acting hit by Mr. Hermann Vezin which literally electrified the house." He was one of W. S. Gilbert's favourite actors. and, besides the aforementioned Dan'l Druce, Blacksmith, he also starred in Gilbert's Randall's Thumb, (1871), and played Mousta in an 1882 revival of Broken Hearts alongside Gilbert himself as Florian (due to an accident incapacitating Kyrle Bellew).

A benefit matinee was held for Vezin at the Haymarket Theatre on March 19, 1896. For this, George Grossmith gave a sketch, and play scenes featured Gerald du Maurier, Herbert Beerbohm Tree and Cyril Maude, among others. Vezin continued to act, appearing in The Happy Life in 1897 and as Rowley in The School for Scandal opposite Herbert Beerbohm Tree in 1909.

In his declining years, Vezin appear infrequently on the stage, rather spending most of his time giving lessons to aspiring thespians, including the actors Herbert Beerbohm Tree, Baliol Holloway and Frank Benson as well as the actress Mary Mannering. He also dedicated himself to appearances at recitals and play readings. His last stage role was Old Rowley in Tree's production of playwright Richard Sheridan's The School for Scandal at His Majesty's Theatre in Scotland, in April 1909. He had been active on the British stage for nearly sixty years, and had been a resident of London, where he died at his home, 10 Lancaster Place, Strand, on June 12, 1910. His body was cremated at Golders Green and his ashes were scattered.
