= Rudolf Jordan =

Rudolf Jordan may refer to:

- Rudolf Jordan (politician) (1902-1988), German Nazi politician
- Rudolf Jordan (painter) (1810-1887), German painter
