= Henry Mosler =

American painter (1841–1920)

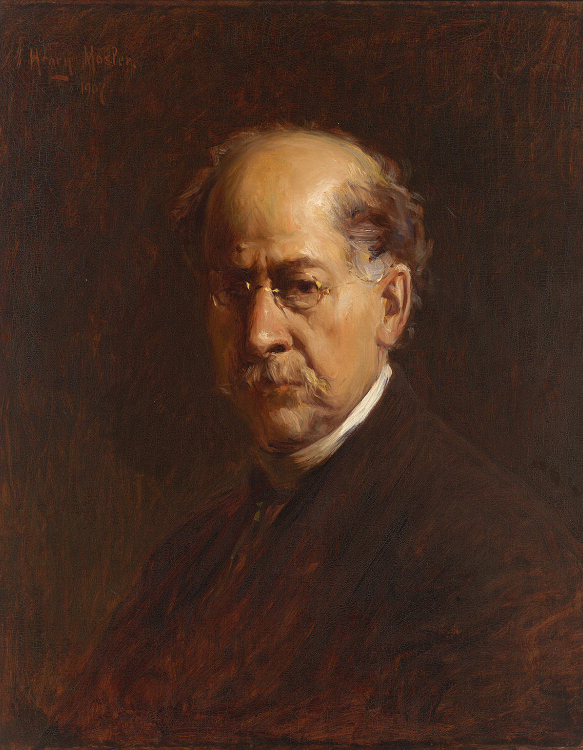
- Self-portrait, 1907
- Born: June 6, 1841; Tropplowitz, Silesia, Prussia (present-day Opawica, Poland)
- Died: April 21, 1920 (aged 78); New York City, New York, US
- Known for: Painting, drawing

Henry Mosler (June 6, 1841 – April 21, 1920) was a German-born painter who documented American life, including colonial themes, Civil War illustrations, and portraits of men and women of society.

== Early life ==
He was born in Tropplowitz, Silesia, Prussia (present-day Opawica, Poland), and moved with his family to New York in 1849, when he was 8 years old. His father, Gustavus Mosler, had worked as a lithographer in Europe, but in New York he found work as a cigar maker and tobacconist. In 1851, the family relocated to Cincinnati, Ohio, the site of a substantial German-Jewish community. Henry was apprenticed to a wood engraver, Horace C. Grosvenor, while still in his early teens, and also was taught the basics of painting by an amateur landscape painter, George Kerr.

== Career ==
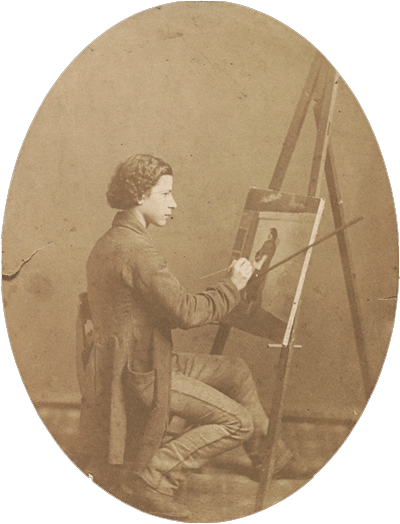
Henry Mosler in 1860

After studying drawing by himself, Mosler became a draughtsman for a comic paper, the Omnibus (Cincinnati), in 1855. From 1859 to 1861 he studied under James Henry Beard, and in 1862–63, during the American Civil War, served as an art correspondent of Harper's Weekly. As with most Jews in the North, Mosler was a strong Union supporter, and Harper's Weekly served as an important voice for the Union forces. He was an aide-de-camp with the Army of the Ohio from 1861 to 1863, and published 34 drawings in Harper's, 18 of them depicting the Kentucky and Ohio Campaign in 1862. He also did portraits of several generals.

In 1863 Mosler went to Düsseldorf, where for almost three years he was at the Royal Academy, and studied under Heinrich Mücke and Albert Kindler; he subsequently went to Paris, where he studied for six months under Ernest Hébert. He returned to Cincinnati in 1866, where received numerous portrait commissions. He also created the first painting for which he received a significant degree of recognition, The Lost Cause, which he exhibited at the National Academy of Design in 1868. This was soon followed by the group Betsy Ross Making the First American Flag.

In 1874, Mosler returned to France, having married Sara Cahn of Cincinnati in 1869. He studied for three years under Carl Theodor von Piloty in Munich, where he won a medal at the Royal Academy. In 1877, he moved to France. While living in Brittany, he painted The Quadroon Girl and Early Cares, both of which were accepted by the Salon of 1878. His Le Retour, from the Paris Salon of 1879, was the first American painting ever bought for the Luxembourg Palace. He received a silver medal at the Salons in Paris 1889, and gold medals at Paris, 1888, and Vienna, 1893.

In 1894 he moved his family to New York, opening a studio in Carnegie Hall. He served as an associate in the National Academy of Design, and continued painting well into the 20th century. He died of heart failure at the age of 78.

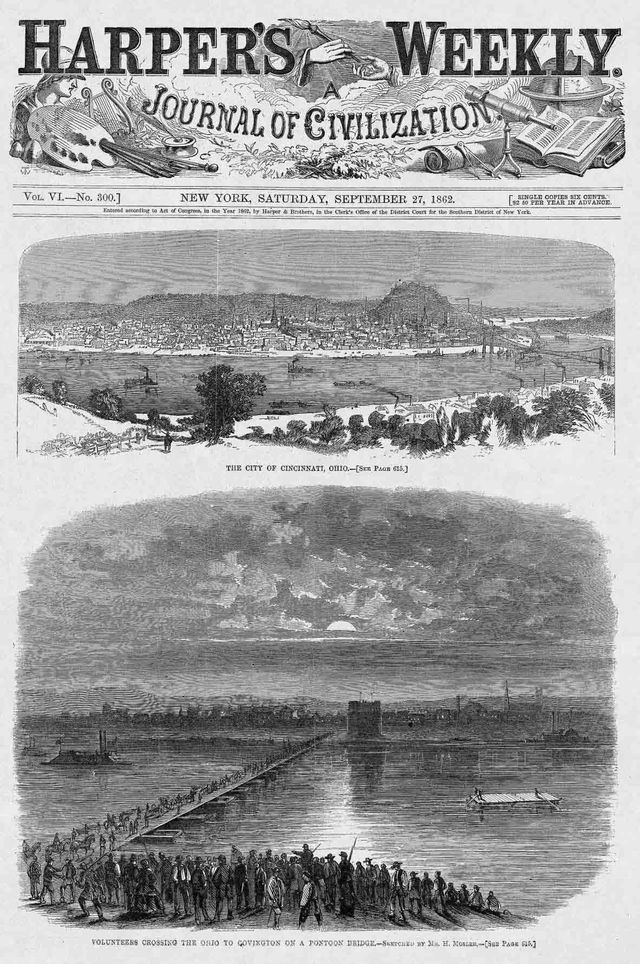
Harper's Weekly cover, September 27, 1862, illustrated by Henry Mosler and depicting the City of Cincinnati, Ohio and Union Volunteers crossing the Ohio River to Covington on a pontoon bridge

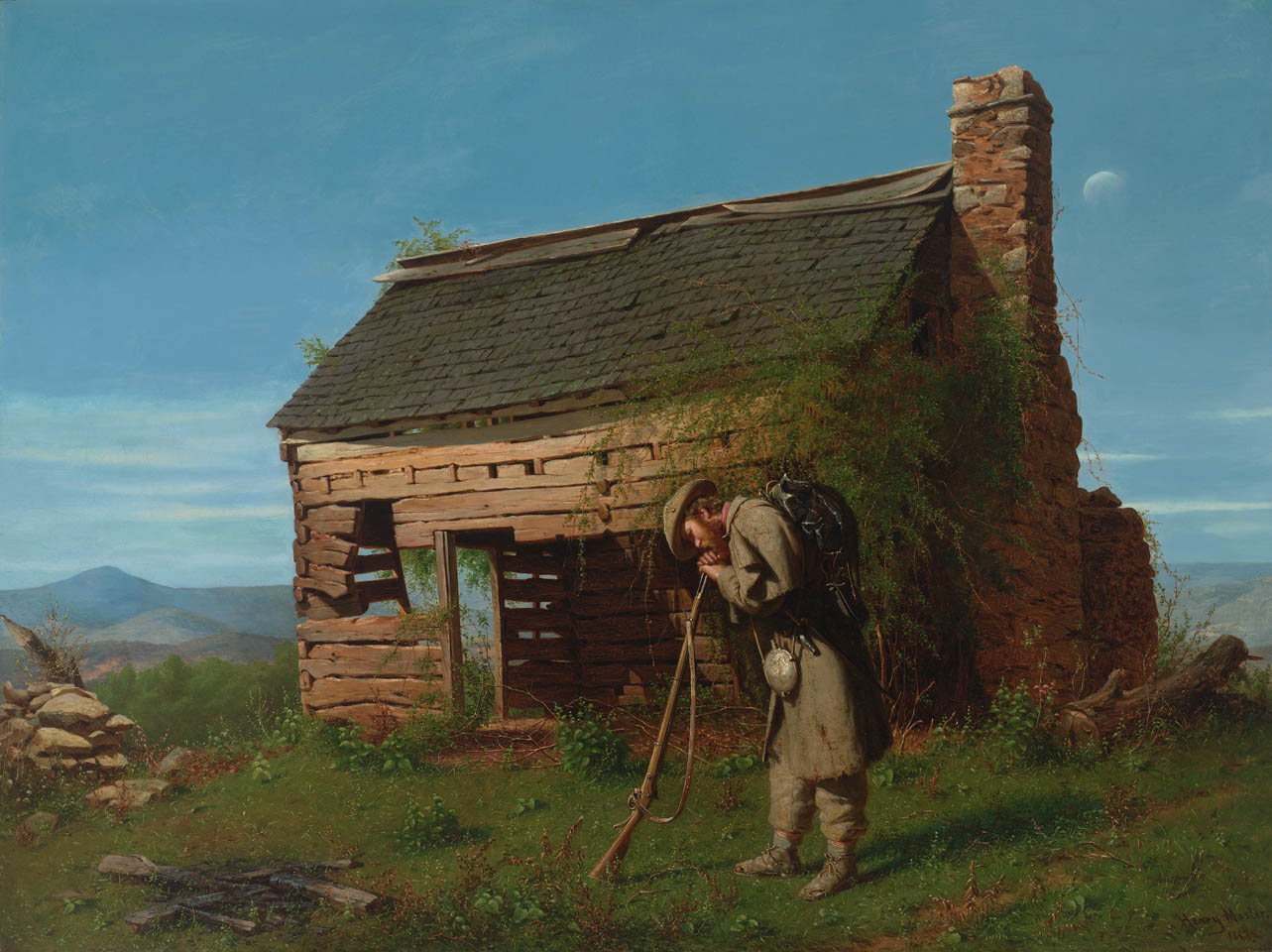
The Lost Cause, 1868. The Johnson Collection, Spartanburg, South Carolina.

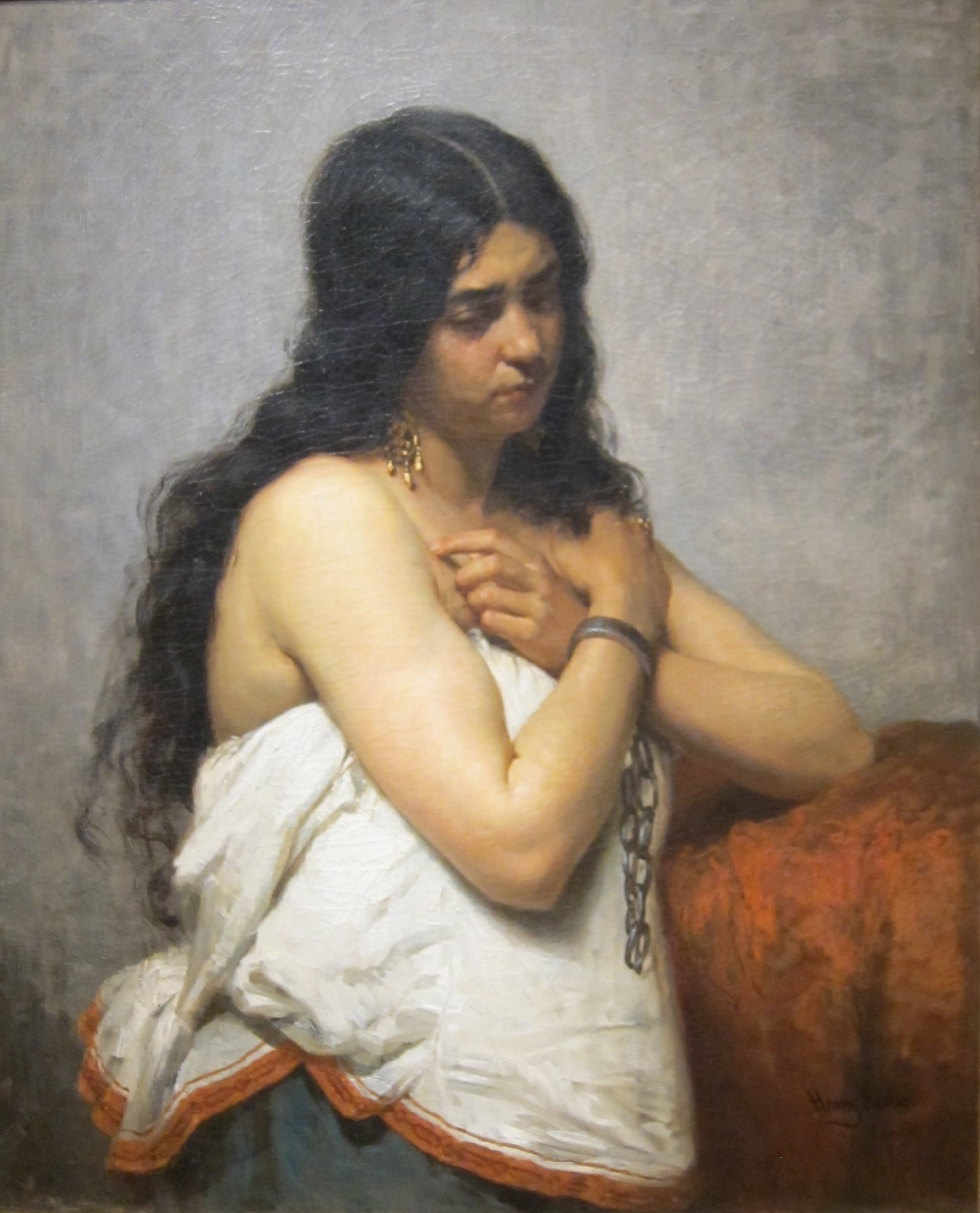
The Quadroon Girl, 1878. Cincinnati Art Museum.

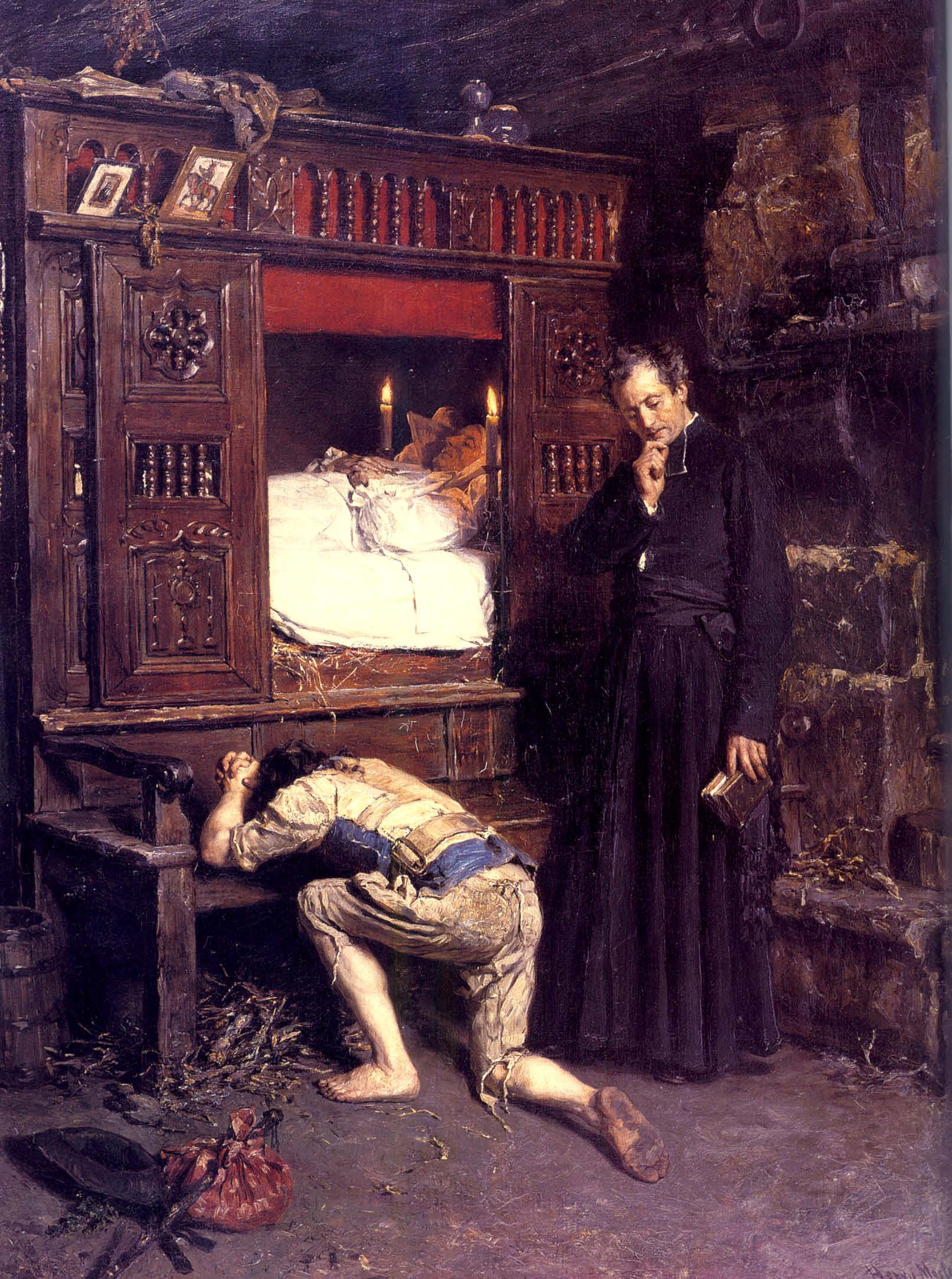
Le Retour, 1879. Breton Departmental Museum, Quimper.

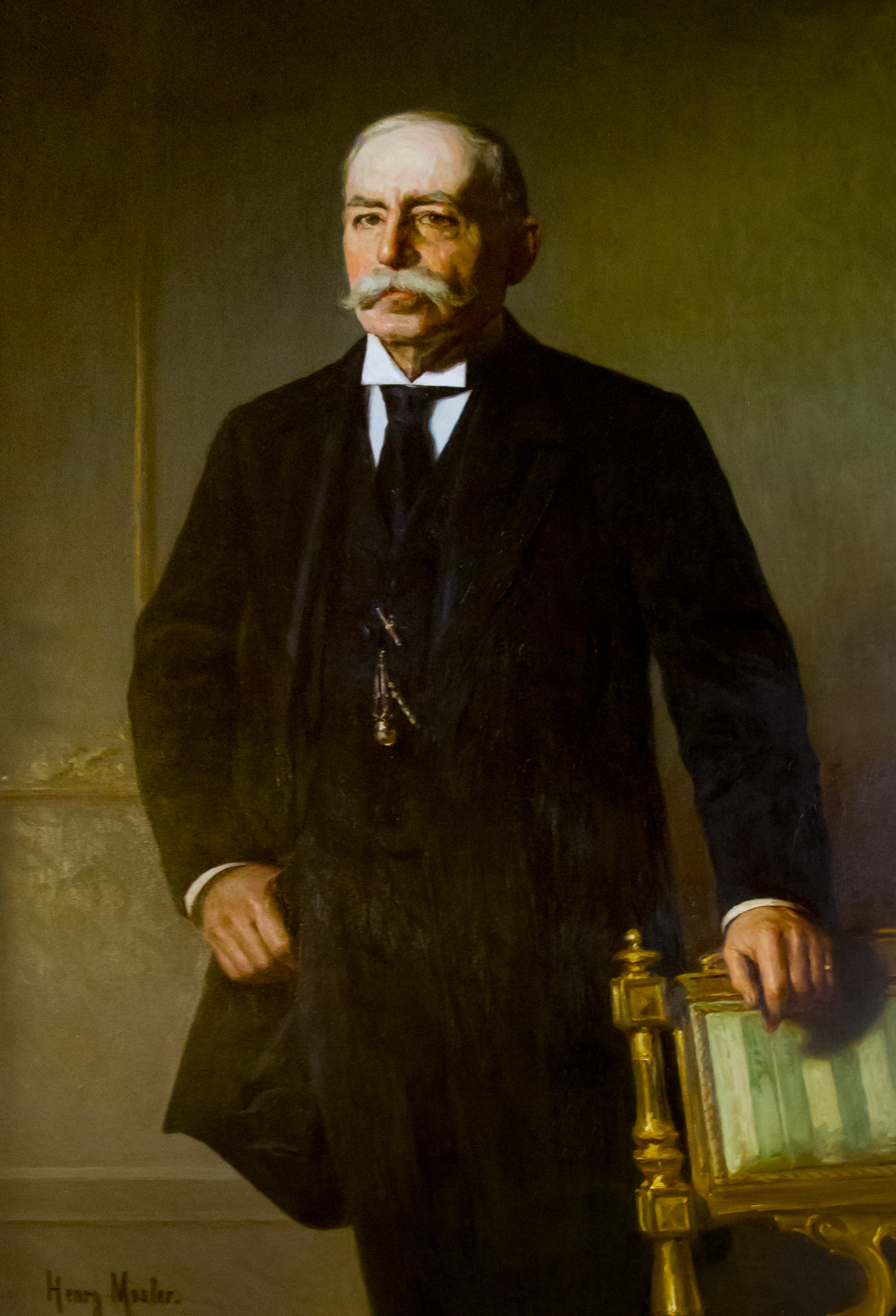
Augustus O. Bourn's official portrait, 1885 by Mosler

== Legacy ==
His son, Gustave Henry Mosler, was also an artist. His other son, Arthur Rembrandt Mosler, was an engineer who married the famous soprano and voice teacher Estelle Liebling. His granddaughter, Audrey Skirball-Kenis (née Marx), was a philanthropist in Los Angeles and founder of the Skirball Cultural Center. His great-grandson, John F. McCrindle, was an art collector and patron of artists and writers, founding the Joseph F. McCrindle Foundation to award grants to arts, music and social justice organizations. His students included Isabelle Davis Seymour, a listed miniature portrait artist of Evanston Illinois, and Wilder M. Darling, an artist and teacher based in Toledo.

Examples of his work are in currently in the collections of the Allentown Art Museum, the Wichita Art Museum, the Smithsonian American Art Museum, the Huntington Library, the Museum of Fine Arts, Boston, the Morris Museum of Art in Augusta, the Sydney Art Museum, NSW, the Cincinnati Art Museum, the Richmond Art Museum, the art museums of Springfield, Massachusetts, and various museums in New York.
