= Kulle =

Kulle is a surname. Notable people with the surname include:

- Axel Kulle (1846–1908), Swedish painter
- Jarl Kulle (1927–1997), Swedish actor and director
- Maria Kulle (born 1960), Swedish actress, daughter of Jarl
- Thora Kulle (1849–1939), Swedish textile artist
