= Opawica =

Opawica may refer to:

- Opawica River, a tributary of the Waswanipi River (watershed of Matagami Lake, Nottaway River and James Bay) in Quebec, Canada
- Opawica Lake, a body of water crossed by the Opawica River in Quebec, Canada
- Opawica, Poland, a village in southwest Poland
