= Heinrich Ludwig Philippi =

German painter

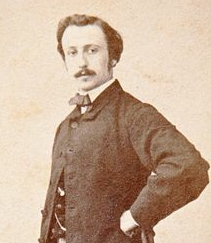
Heinrich Ludwig Philippi (1865)

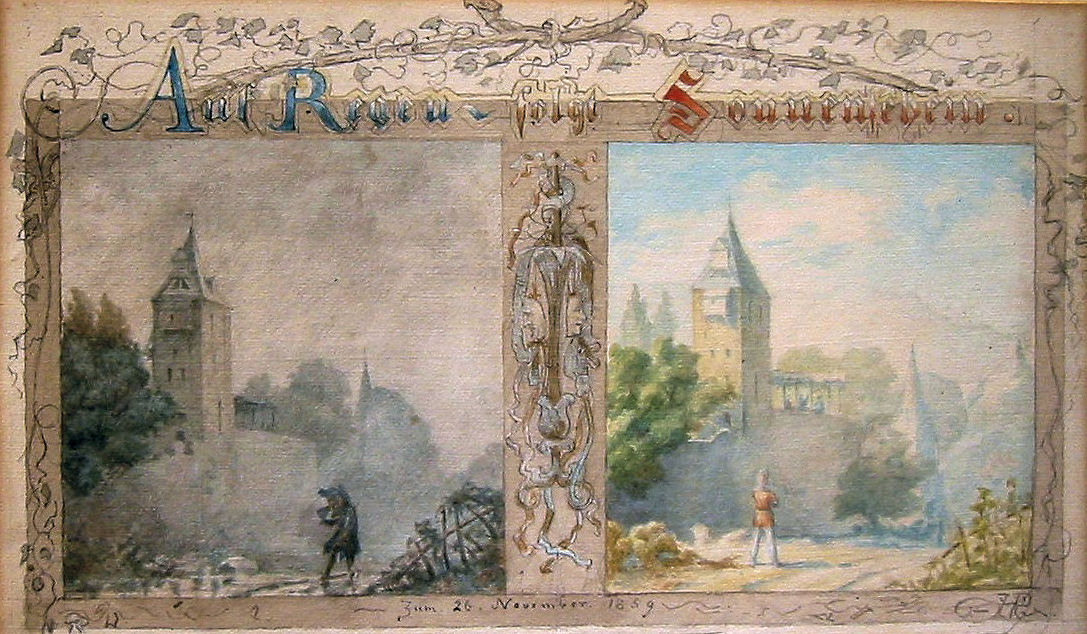
"After the Rain, Comes the Sunshine"

Heinrich Ludwig Philippi (9 June 1838 – 16 September 1874) was a German history painter associated with the Düsseldorfer Malerschule. He was primarily known as a watercolorist.

== Biography ==
He was born in Kleve. His father, Johann Friedrich Hector Philippi was a jurist and member of the Prussian House of Representatives for Elberfeld.

After completing his secondary education in 1857, he took an extended study trip to Berlin, Frankfurt and Dresden, with the intention of becoming an artist. In Dresden, Eduard Bendemann, a professor at the Academy of Fine Arts, to whom he was distantly related, advised him to attend the Kunstakademie Düsseldorf, which he did. While there, he studied with Wilhelm Sohn and Adolph Schroedter. He also studied architecture with Rudolf Wiegmann and art history with Carl Müller (1818–1893).

In 1859, Bendemann was named Director of the Kunstakademie and Philippi became engaged to his daughter Marie. The engagement was short-lived however, as Philippi's father ordered him to break it off, on the grounds that he would not be able to support a wife and family while still a student. His education was also interrupted by a brief period of military service.

He continued his studies in Munich with Carl Theodor von Piloty then, from 1865 to 1866, undertook independent studies in Rome, advised by Anselm Feuerbach. In 1866, he was conscripted for service in the Austro-Prussian War and had to return to Germany. That same year, he was slightly wounded at the Battle of Königgrätz.

In 1868, he married Elisabeth Jordan (1849–1923), niece of the painter Rudolf Jordan. The marriage was childless. His younger brother was the Archive director in Münster and historian, Friedrich Philippi.

Two years later, he again found himself conscripted; this time for the Franco-Prussian War, serving as a Captain in the Landwehr and spending some time at a detention camp. His war experiences aggravated his previously manageable tuberculosis, and he died from it in 1874, in Düsseldorf.

== Sources ==
- Hans Ost: Heinrich Philippi. In: Hans Paffrath (Ed.): Lexikon der Düsseldorfer Malerschule 1819–1918. Vol.3: Nabert–Zwecker. Bruckmann, Munich, 1998, ISBN 3-7654-3011-0, pgs.90–91.
- G. Ebe: Der Deutsche Cicerone. Führer durch die Kunstschätze der Länder deutscher Zunge. Vol.III: Malerei. Deutsche Schulen. Spamer, Leipzig 1898, pg.429 Online
