= Henry Ritter =

German painter

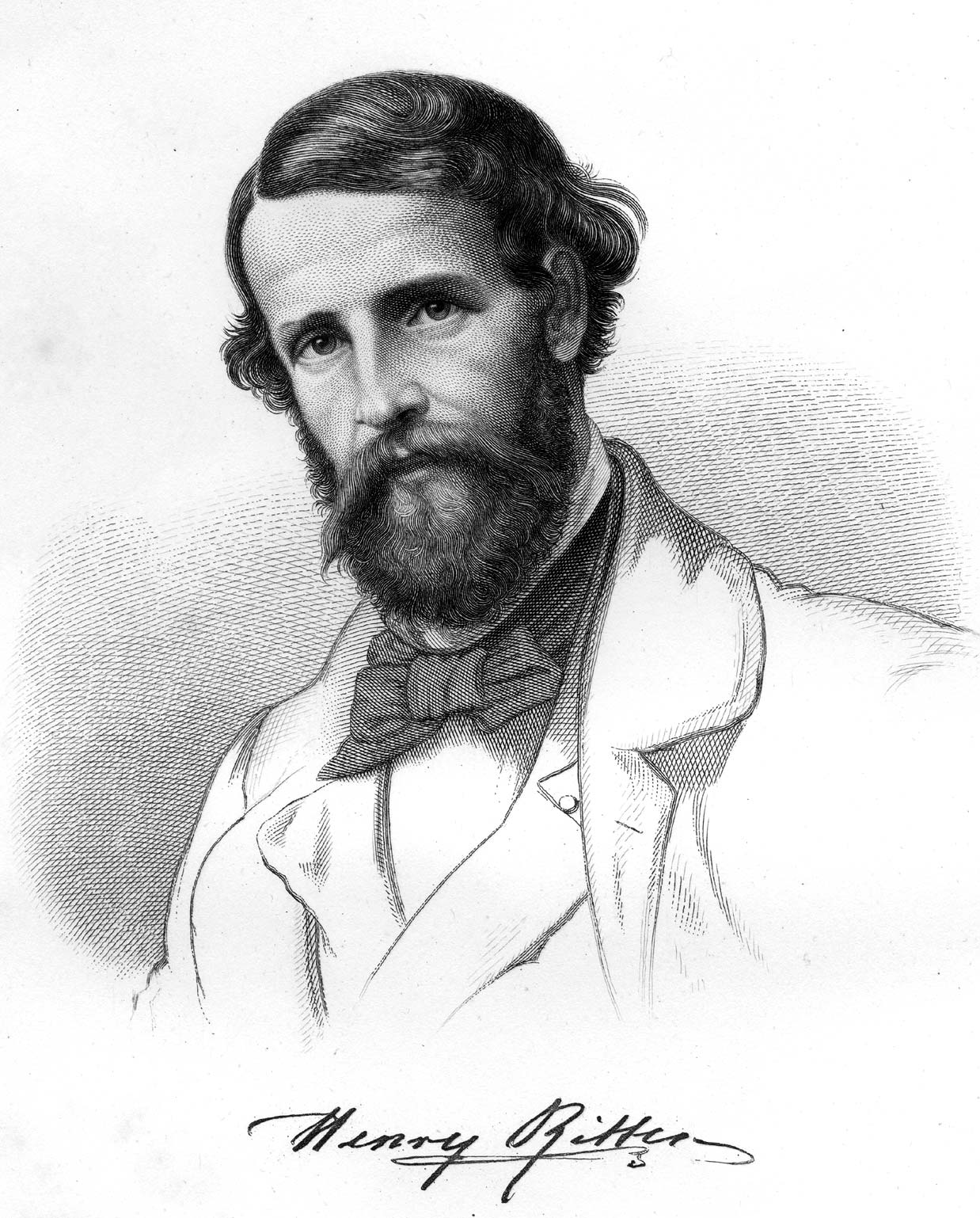
Henry Ritter; engraving by an unknown artist (Self-portrait?)

Henry Ritter (24 May 1816, in Montreal – 21 December 1853, in Düsseldorf) was a German Canadian-born genre painter and illustrator; associated with the Düsseldorfer Malerschule.

== Biography ==
His father was a Kingdom of Hanover officer, working with the British military, and his mother was English. At a young age, he went to live with an uncle in the Free and Hanseatic City of Hamburg, where he served a commercial apprenticeship. After 1832, he received his first art lessons from Heinrich Jacob Aldenrath and Friedrich Carl Gröger.

From 1836 to 1847, he was a student at the Kunstakademie Düsseldorf, in the classes of Karl Ferdinand Sohn and Friedrich Wilhelm Schadow. During his last seven years there, he was a member of the Master Class and had his own studio at the Akademie. Most influential, however, were the private lessons he took in 1837 and 1838 from Rudolf Jordan, who took him on trips to the North Sea, became his friend and taught him an ethnographic approach to painting.

In 1842, he married a landowner's daughter from Bonn. Due to an ailment diagnosed as a "nervous fever", he moved to Seligenthal, near Siegburg. He returned to Düsseldorf in 1852 and died there the following year. His remaining works were preserved by Ferdinand Fagerlin, who married his sister-in-law and took over his studio.

He was, perhaps, better known as an illustrator than a painter. From 1847, he was a regular contributor to the satirical Düsseldorfer Monathefte. In 1849, he published Der Politische Struwwelpeter, a satire on the recent Revolution and the subject of German unification; based on the children's book, Struwwelpeter. From 1851 to 1853, he provided drawings for albums published by Wolfgang Müller von Königswinter. Among his notable book illustrations are those for a collection of works by Washington Irving.

== Selected works ==
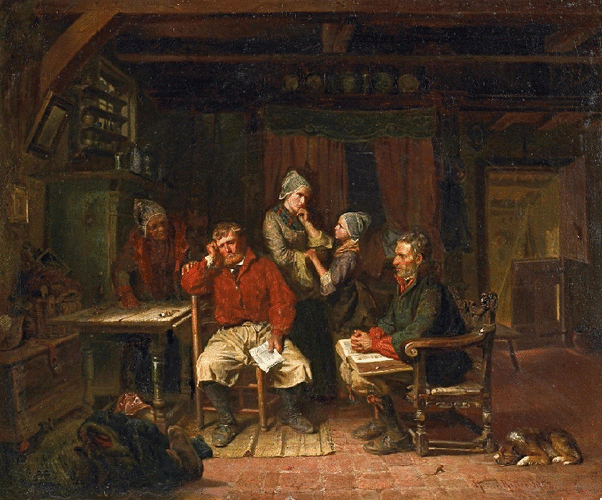
Writing to the Family

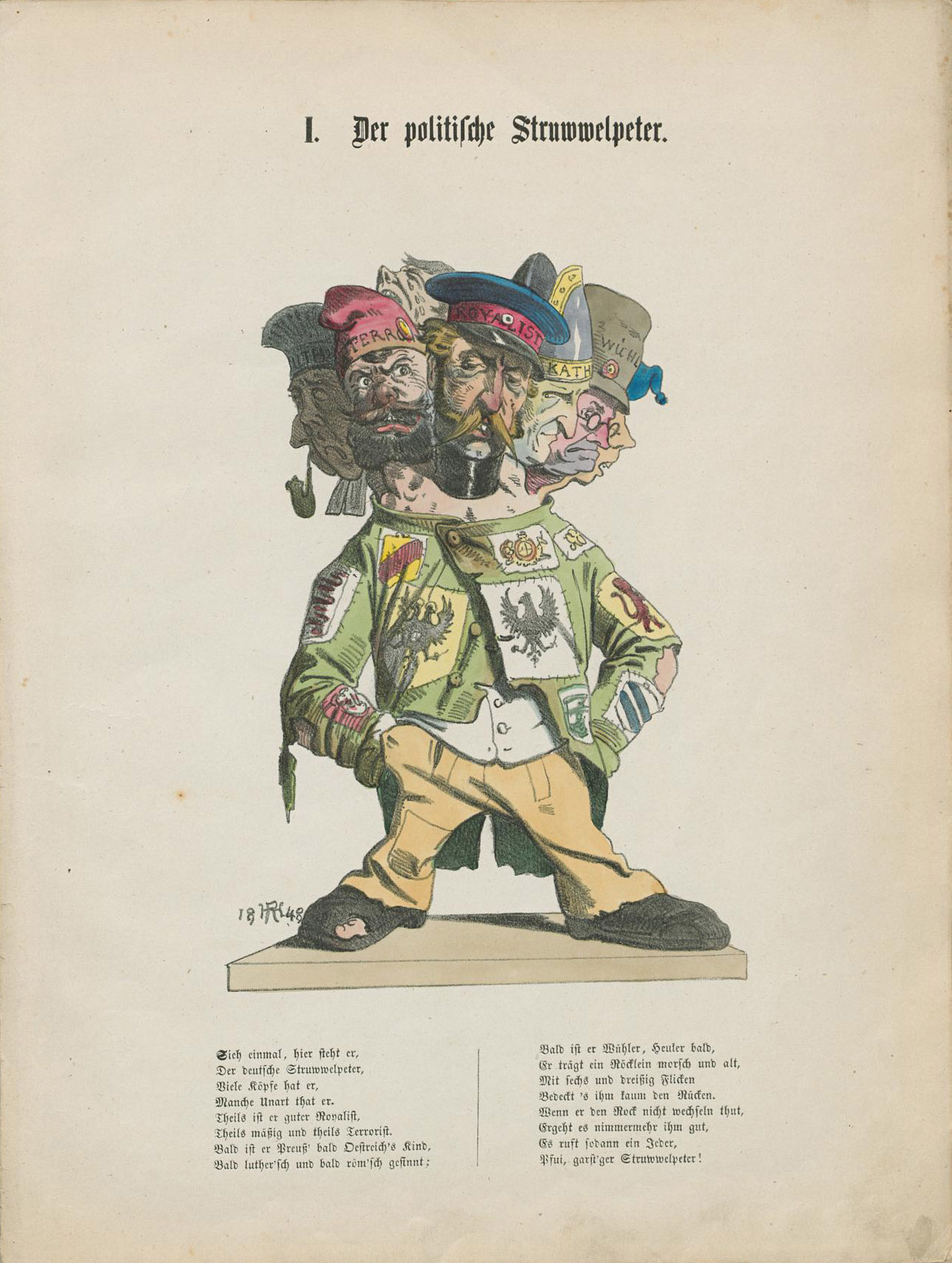
Divided Germany, from Der Politische Struwwelpeter

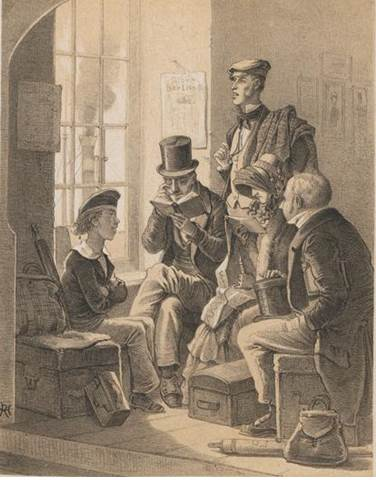
English People

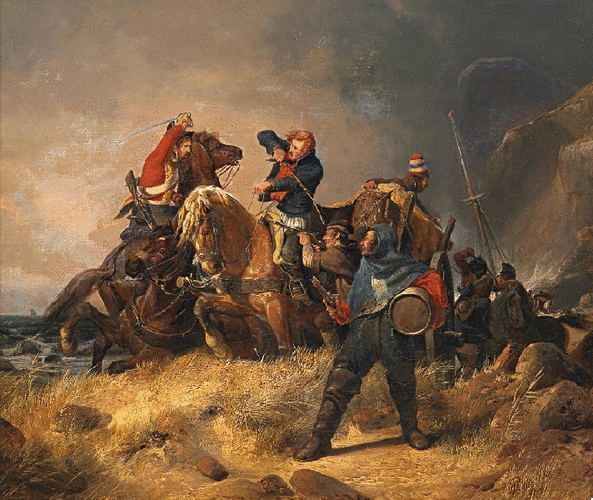
Fighting Smugglers on
the English Coast
