= Anton Dieffenbach =

German painter (1831–1914)

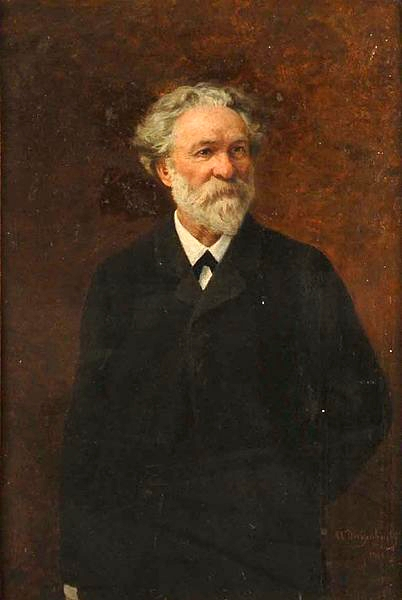
Self-portrait (1904)

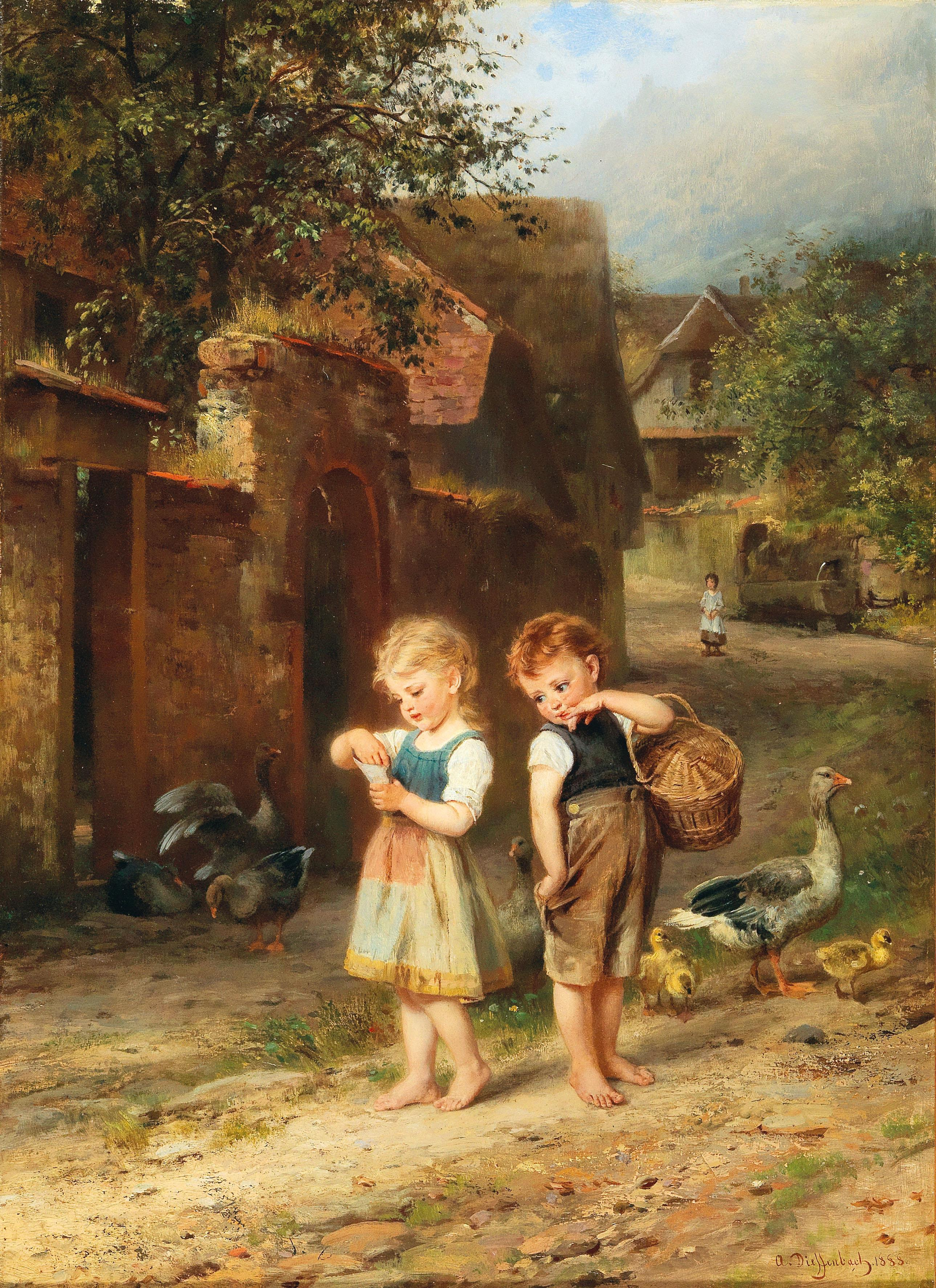
Feeding the Ducks

Anton Heinrich Dieffenbach (4 February 1831 – 29 November 1914) was a German landscape and genre painter; noted for his portrayals of children.

== Biography ==
He was born in Wiesbaden but moved to Straßburg with his parents in 1840 and took lessons from a local artist named Charles Duhamel. With Duhamel's recommendation, he was able to go to Paris and study with the sculptor, James Pradier. Following Pradier's death in 1852, he returned to Germany and settled in Wiesbaden and decided to devote himself entirely to painting.

After only a year, he relocated to Düsseldorf, where he studied intermittently at the Kunstakademie, from 1856 to 1857, with Christian Köhler. He also took private lessons from Karl Ferdinand Sohn and Rudolf Jordan.

For several years, he was a member of the progressive artists' association, Malkasten (paintbox). His choice of subject matter was strongly influenced by Ludwig Knaus, although he was never one of Knaus' students. His painting Ein Tag vor der Hochzeit ("A Day Before the Wedding") was created as a kind of homage to one of Knaus' best known works (The Golden Wedding). He made two copies, one of which was acquired for King Charles I of Württemberg. The other was sold in the United States in 1868.

In 1863, after a brief period of military service, he settled in Paris and lived there until the outbreak of the Franco-Prussian War. At that time, he went to Switzerland then, after the war, to Berlin. In 1897, he returned to the city of his youth, Straßburg.

He was named an honorary member of the "Association of Straßburg Artists" and spent his summer months in the Vosges, where he made numerous sketches that he turned into oils at his studio. His paintings from this period consist almost entirely of landscapes. He died in 1914 in Le Hohwald.

== Sources ==
- Friedrich von Boetticher: Malerwerke des 19. Jahrhunderts. Beitrag zur Kunstgeschichte I-1. Dresden 1891.
- Friedrich Jansa (Ed.): Deutsche bildende Künstler in Wort und Bild. Leipzig 1912.
- Hans Wolfgang Singer (Ed.): Allgemeines Künstlerlexikon. Leben und Werke der berühmtesten bildenden Künstler, vorbereitet von Hermann Alexander Müller. Literarische Anstalt Rütten & Loening, Frankfurt / Main 1921, Vol.1
- Dieffenbach, Anton Heinrich. In: Hans Vollmer: Allgemeines Lexikon der bildenden Künstler des XX. Jahrhunderts., E. A. Seemann, Leipzig 1961.
- René Metz: Les peintres alsaciens de 1870 à 1914. Diss. Univ. Strasbourg 1971.
- Hans Paffrath (Ed.): Lexikon der Düsseldorfer Malerschule 1819–1918. Band 1: Abbema–Gurlitt. Published by the Kunstmuseum Düsseldorf in Ehrenhof and the Galerie Paffrath. Bruckmann, München 1997, ISBN 3-7654-3009-9, pgs.283–285
