= Gustave Henry Mosler =

American painter

Gustave Henry Mosler (June 16, 1875 – August 17, 1906), was a United States painter.

He was a pupil of his father, Henry Mosler, and of Léon Bonnat, exhibited at the Salon in Paris, receiving a medal for his "De Profundis" in 1891; his portrait of Governor J. W. Stewart is in the State House, Montpelier, Vermont, and his "Empty Cradle" is in the Toledo Art Club.

He died in Margaretville, New York.
