= Ernestine Friedrichsen =

19th-century German painter

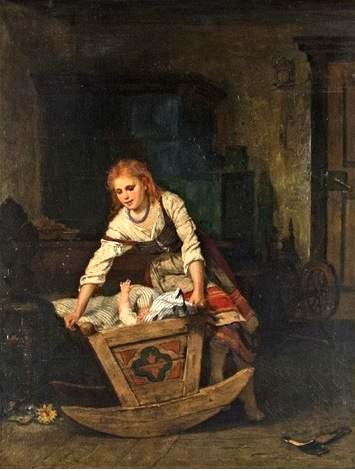
A Child of Joy

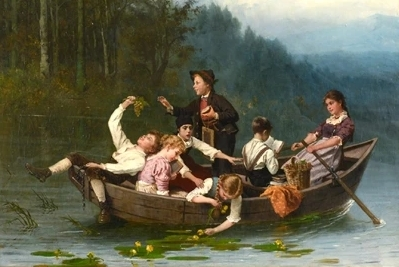
A Merry Crew

Ernestine Friedrichsen (29 June 1824, Danzig - 21 July 1892, Düsseldorf) was a German genre painter; primarily of family scenes.

== Biography ==
Little is known about her early life. In the 1850s, she took private art lessons in Düsseldorf with Marie Wiegmann; focusing on portrait painting. Later, she studied with Wilhelm Sohn and learned genre painting from Rudolf Jordan.

She made numerous study trips, to Holland, Belgium, England and Italy, as well as to places within Germany, such as Holstein, Bavaria and Masuria, which she found especially amenable as a source of inspiration. The January Uprising and the Jewish communities in Poland were also recurring motifs in her work.

Her first showing came in 1861 at an academic exhibition in Dresden. After that, she took part in various exhibitions of the Kunstverein für die Rheinlande und Westfalen. She maintained a private studio in Düsseldorf from 1867 until her death.

She was also a member of the Verein der Berliner Künstlerinnen, an association of female artists. In 1884, Kaiser Wilhelm I purchased her painting, "Sommerlust". By that time, her works had become collector's items outside of Germany. Eventually, she exhibited in Dresden, Berlin, Munich and Hamburg.
