= Ferdinand Fagerlin =

Genre painter (1825–1907)

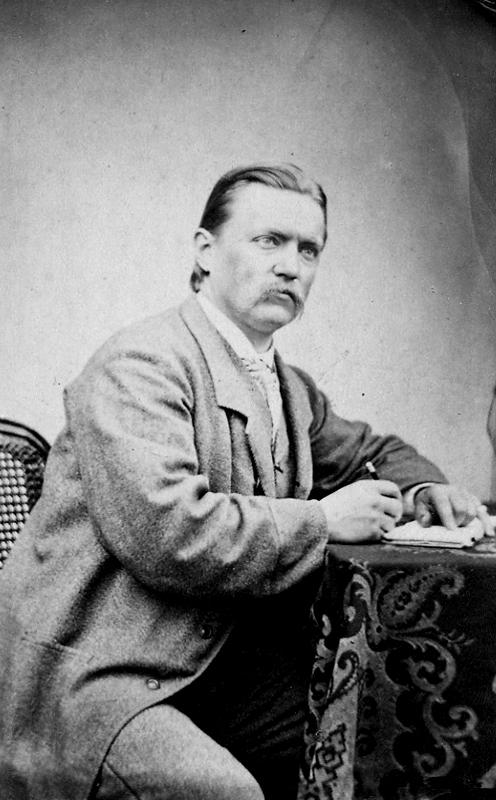
Ferdinand Fagerlin

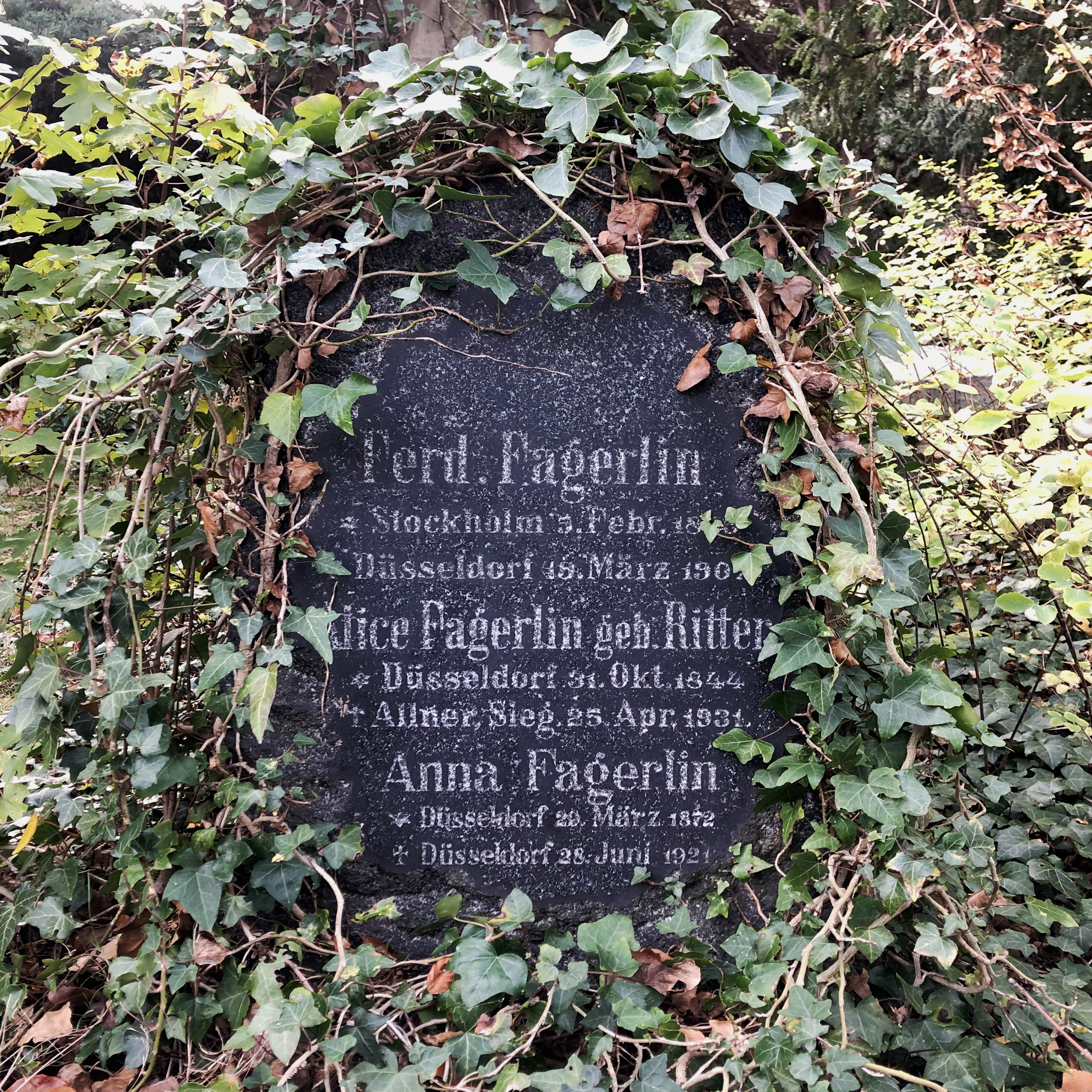
Gravestone Fagerlin on Nordfriedhof in Düsseldorf

Ferdinand Julius Fagerlin (5 February 1825 – 19 March 1907) was a Swedish-German genre painter.

== Biography ==
Born in Stockholm, Fagerlin first apprenticed as a shipbuilder (1842–1843) before attending the Royal Swedish Academy of Arts (1845–1847). He joined the army (1850–1854) and practiced painting, particularly portraits. From 1854 on he dedicated himself completely to painting and with the support of his former teachers studied at the Kunstakademie Düsseldorf, with Karl Ferdinand Sohn und Friedrich Wilhelm Schadow (1854–1855). He spent time in Paris (1856–1858), where he worked in the shop of Thomas Couture.

On his return to Düsseldorf in 1958, he settled as a painter and married Alice (1844–1931), daughter of painter Henry Ritter (1816–1853) whose shop he inherited after the latter's death in 1853. From 1862 to 1902 he was a member of the Düsseldorf art society, Malkasten. The Swedish painter Axel Kulle was his student from 1875 to 1880.

After 1863, he traveled frequently to the Netherlands, and the imagery he acquired there, particularly of the Dutch coast and the life of its sailors and inhabitants became formative in his genre painting. In 1867 he showed Der Heiratsantrag and Die Eifersucht at the International Exposition in Paris. He died in Düsseldorf six weeks after his 82nd birthday.

== Notable works ==
- Die angehenden Raucher (Nationalmuseum Stockholm)
- Die Eifersucht (Nationalmuseum Stockholm)
- Die Liebeserklärung
- Der Heiratsantrag
- Die Krankenstube
- Der verschmähte Freier
- Die Genesende (Häusliche Andacht), 1867 (Nationalmuseum Stockholm)

== Selected works ==
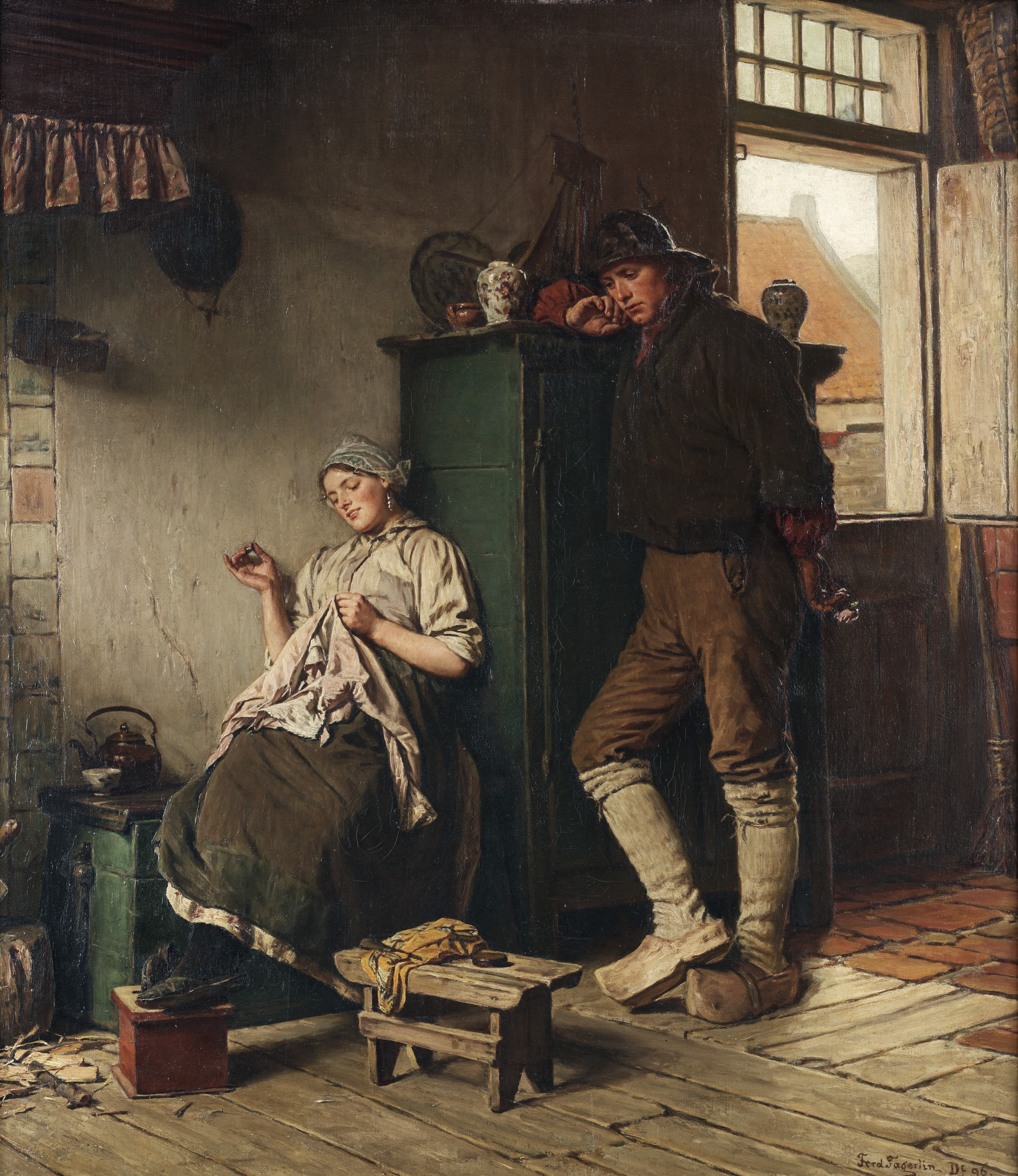
The Desperate Suitor

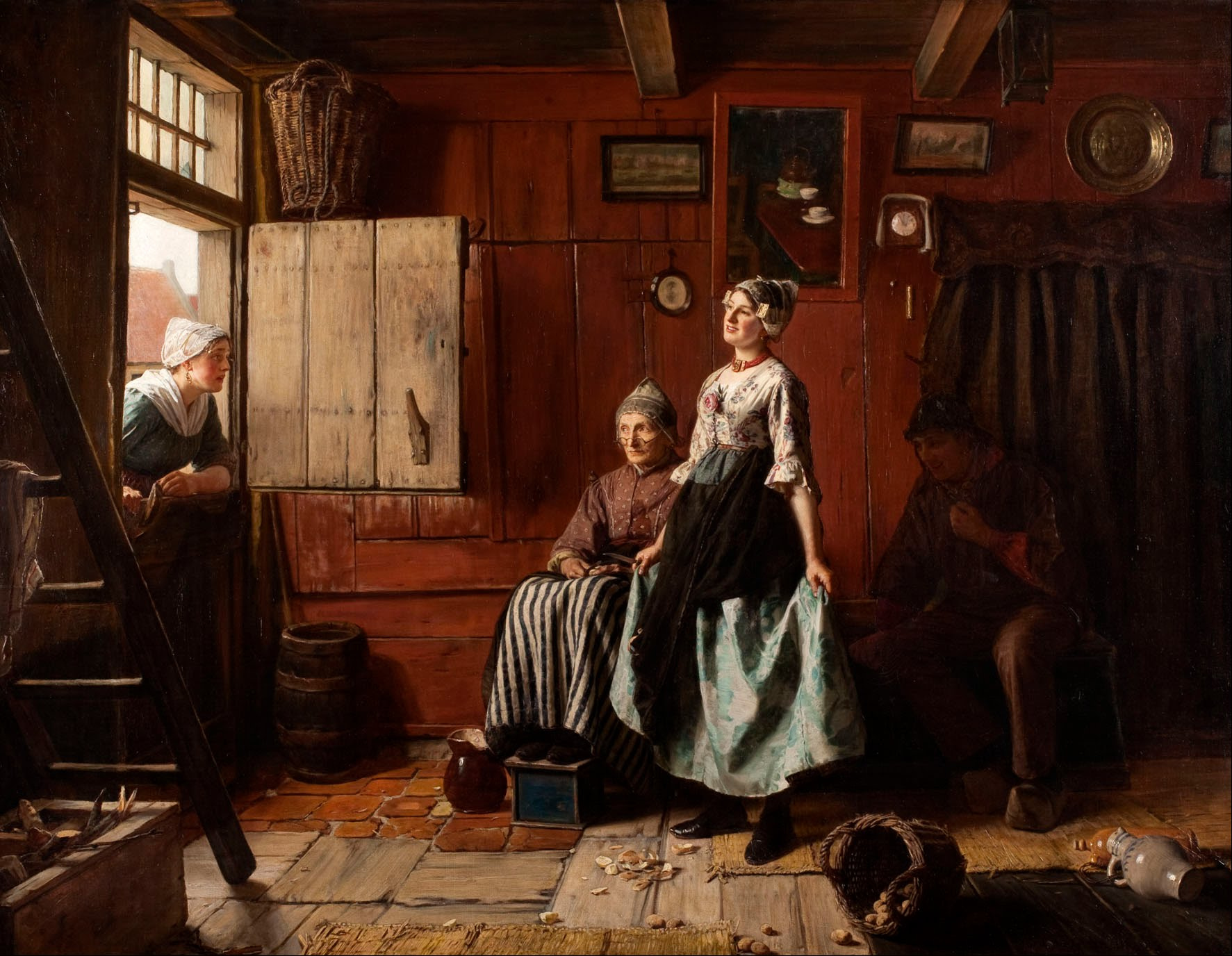
Surprised, 1888

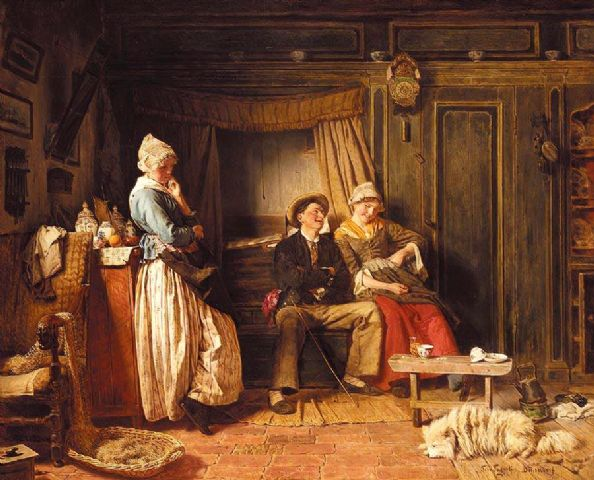
Wishing I Were Her

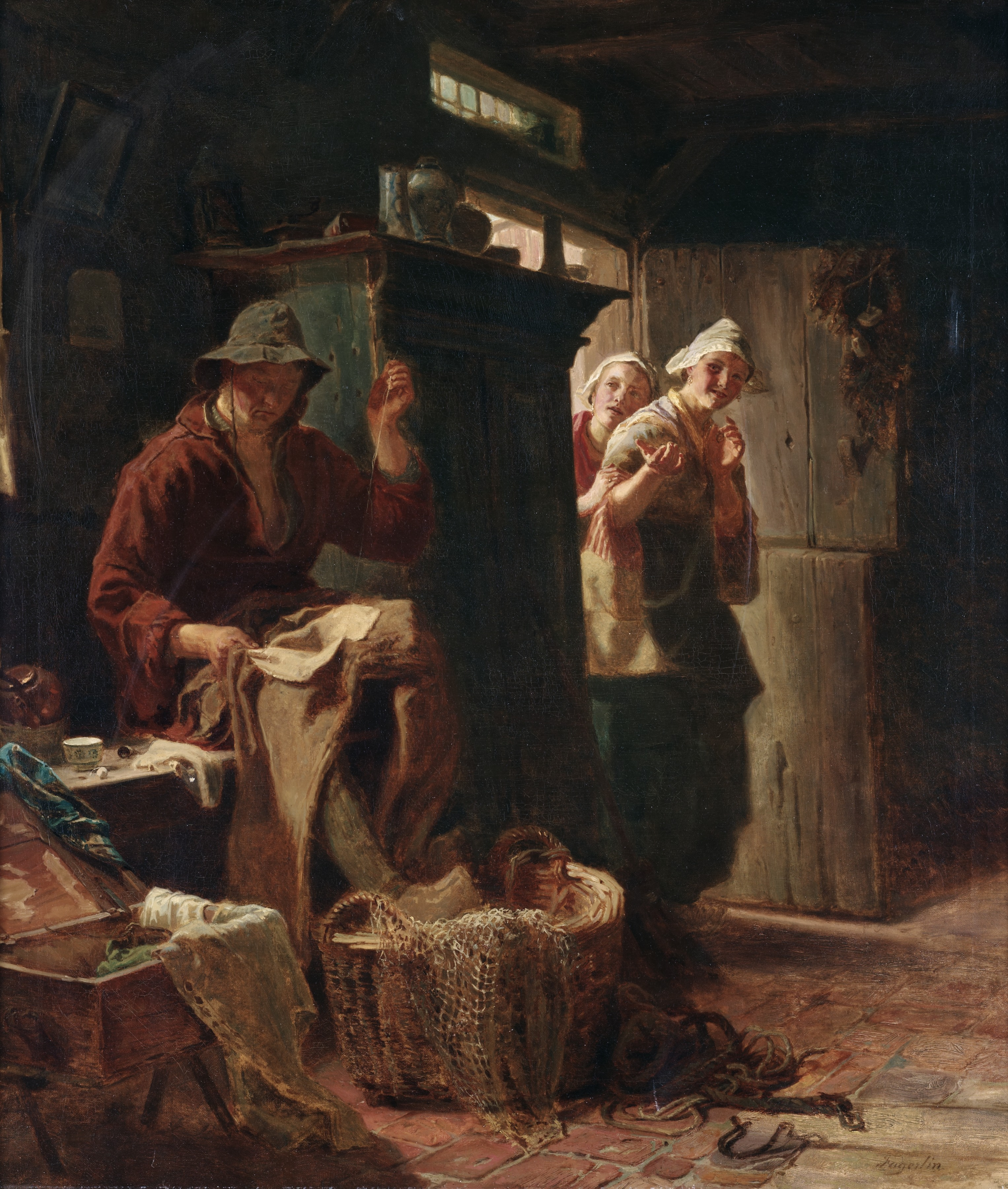
The Mocked Bachelor

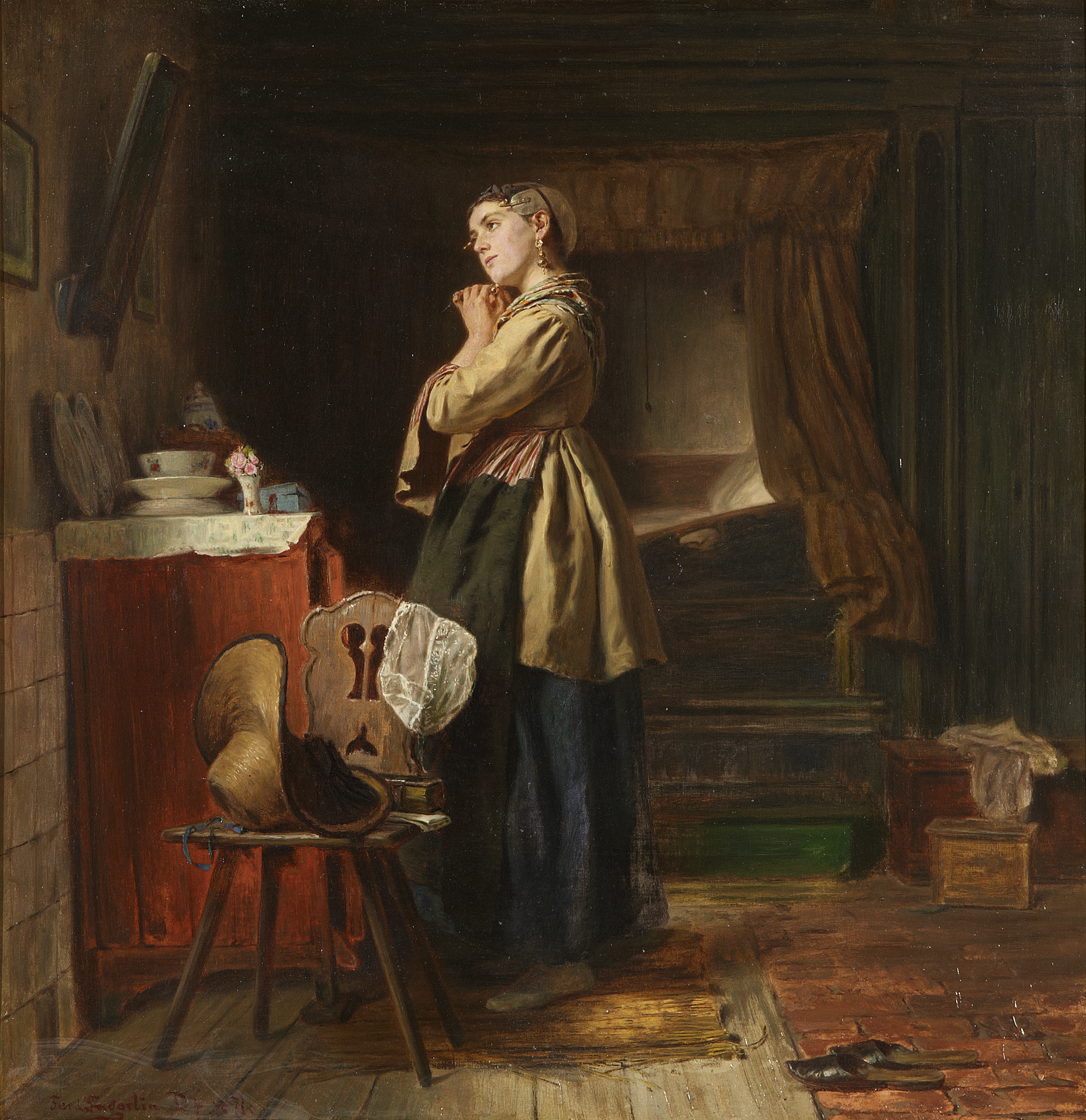
Girl in Front of a Mirror
