= Opawica, Poland =

Opawica
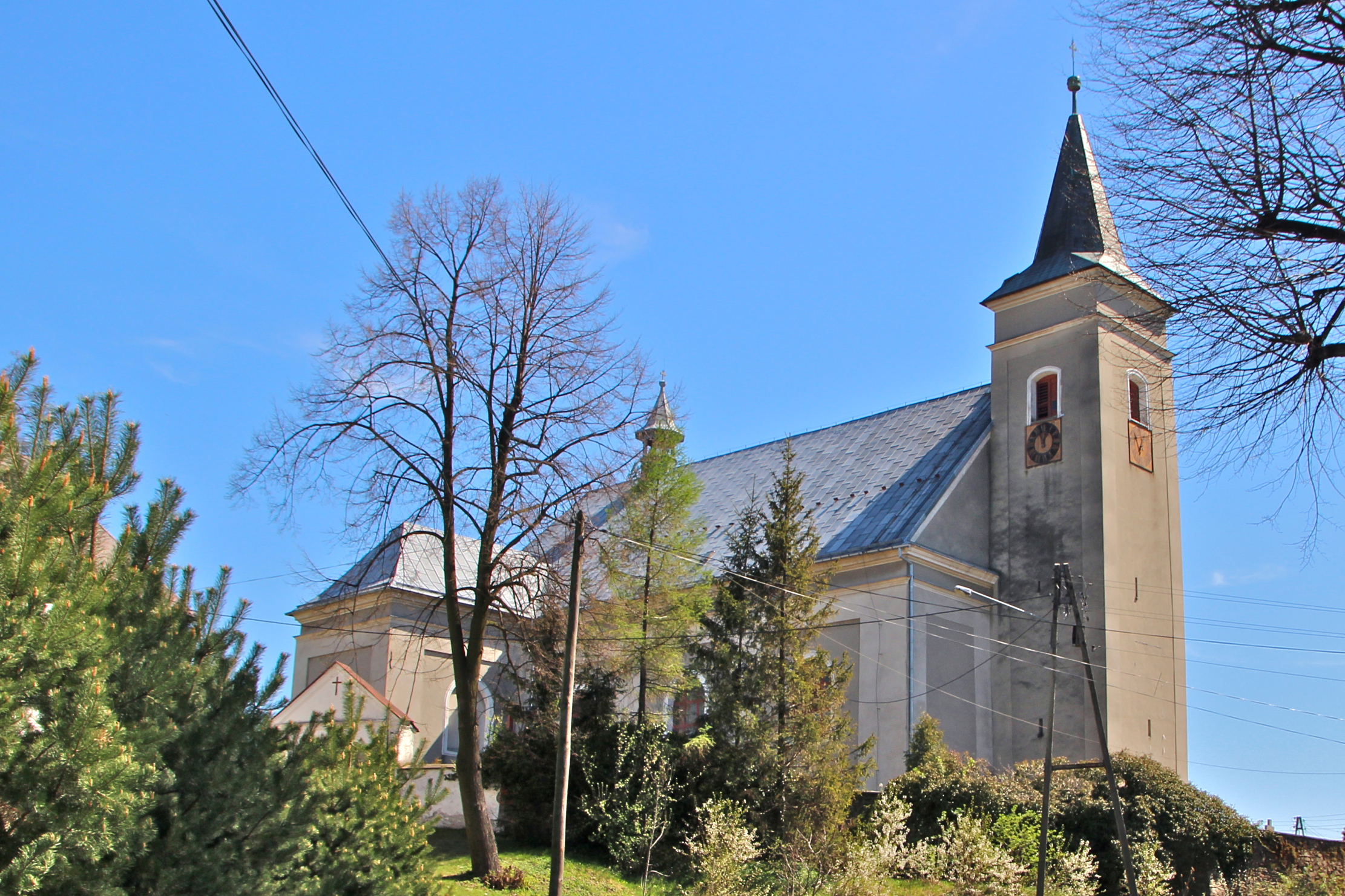
- Holy Trinity Church

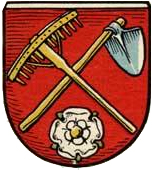
- Coat of arms

- Location within Poland
- Coordinates: 50°09′02″N 17°36′21″E
- Country: Poland
- Voivodeship: Opole
- County: Głubczyce
- Gmina: Głubczyce
- Time zone: UTC+1 (CET)
  - Summer (DST): UTC+2 (CEST)
- Area code: +48 77
- Car plates: OGL

Opawica (Polish: [ɔpaˈvit͡sa]; Silesian: Troplowice; Czech: Opavice; German: Tropplowitz or Troplowitz) is a village located in Poland, in the Opole Voivodeship, Głubczyce County and Gmina Głubczyce, near the border with the Czech Republic.

== History ==
The present-day Polish village Opawica and the present-day Czech village Opavice, directly across the Czech side of the border, were once a single village. After the Silesian Wars, the newly drawn border divided the village in two. The division continued through the Communist era of 1945–1990, and the border was not easily crossed until the two countries joined the Schengen Area in 2007.

== Natives ==
- Henry Mosler (1841–1920), American painter
