= Axel Kulle =

Swedish painter (1846–1908)

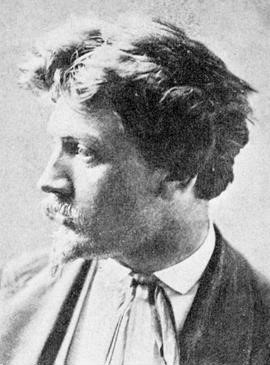
Axel Kulle

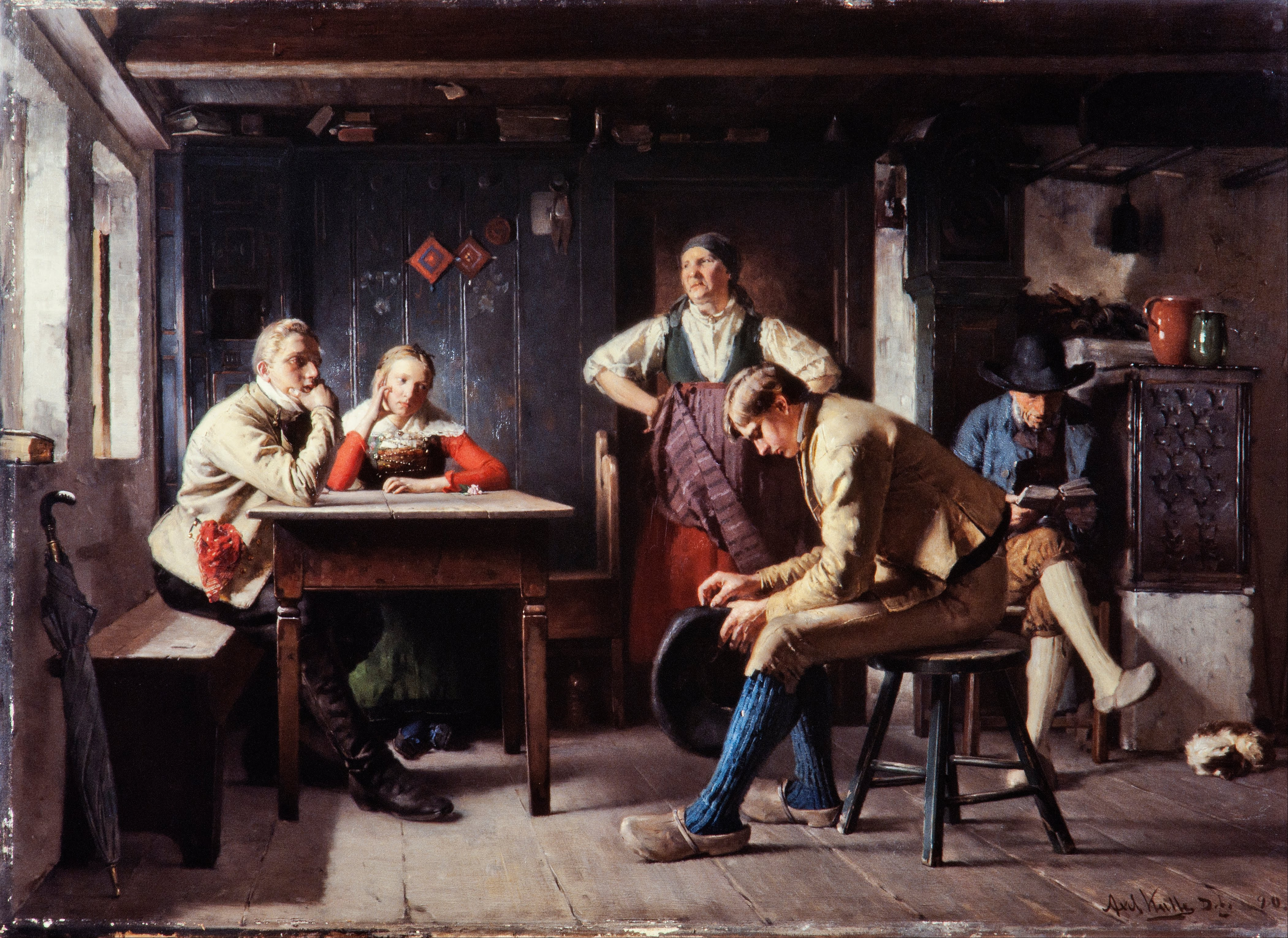
Proposal (The Rivals)

Henrik Axel Kulle (22 March 1846 – 27 February 1908) was a Swedish painter who specialized in genre scenes.

== Biography ==
Kulle was born in Lund, Sweden. His father was a brewer and innkeeper. His older brother, Jakob, was also a painter and his younger brother, Sven, was a medalist.

He was apprenticed to a local painter. In 1865, enrolled at the Royal Swedish Academy of Fine Arts where he studied until 1872. He returned to Lund the following year and was able to sell some paintings to the local Art Society. In 1875, he left home for Düsseldorf, where he studied with Swedish-German genre painter Ferdinand Fagerlin. He introduced Kulle to the Düsseldorf School work. In 1877, Kulle sent home a painting, "The Church Council in Skåne", that was bought by the Nationalmuseum.

In 1880, he received a scholarship from the Dahlgrenska Foundation in Strömstad and moved to Paris. He remained there for three years, painting en plein aire and developing a brighter color scheme. When he returned to Sweden, he continued to paint genre scenes, but also created portraits and still-lifes.

In 1885, he was one of the signatories to a document drawn up by the group known as the opponents (Opponenterna), a group of 85 artists who opposed the teaching methods at the Royal Academy and were in favour of modernisation. Despite this, in 1887 he was named a representative member of the Royal Academy and began teaching there. From then until 1892, he also gave private drawing and painting lessons. From 1891, he was accredited to teach the drawing of ancient artefacts (antikritning). The artist Rikard Lindström, one of his last students, recalled him in his old age as a man who always dressed very formally and said as little as possible. Kulle died in Stockholm in 1908.

His works may be seen at the Nationalmuseum, Göteborgs konstmuseum, Lunds universitets konstmuseum and the Kulturhistoriska museet in Lund.
