= Albert Kindler =

German painter (1833–1876)

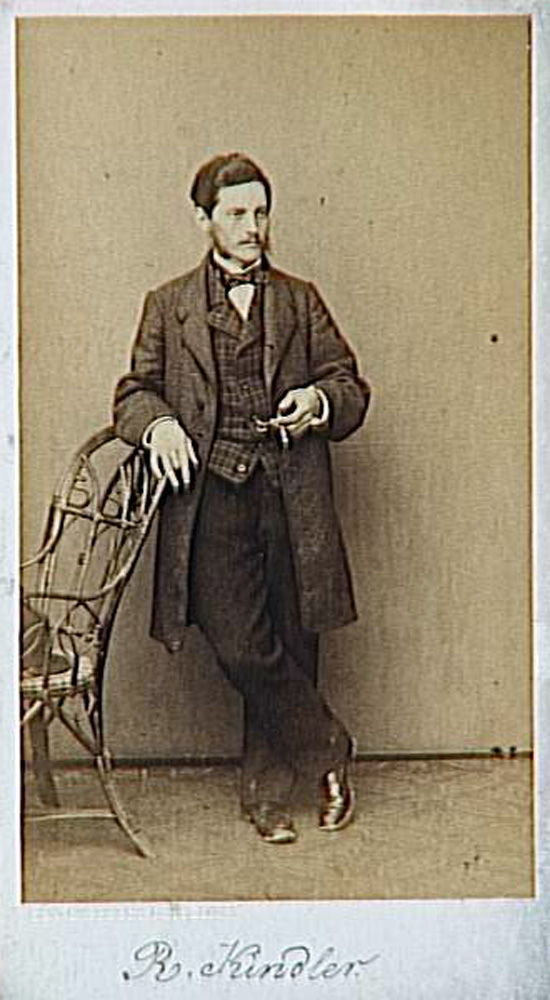
- Albert Kindler; photograph by Arnold Overbeck
- Born: 1833; Allensbach, Germany
- Died: 4 April 1876 (aged 42–43); Merano
- Education: Academy of Fine Arts, Munich; Kunstakademie Düsseldorf
- Occupation: painter
- Known for: Romanticism, Düsseldorfer Malerschule
- Notable work: "Wedding Procession on the Rhine"

Albert Kindler (1833 – 4 April 1876) was a German genre painter in the late Romantic style; associated with the Düsseldorfer Malerschule.

== Biography ==
He was born in Allensbach. He began his studies at the Academy of Fine Arts, Munich but, by 1856, he had moved to Düsseldorf, where he studied with Friedrich Wilhelm von Schadow at the Kunstakademie. This was followed by private classes with Karl Ferdinand Sohn.

His professional career began in the studios of Rudolf Jordan. It was there he became associated with the Düsseldorfer Malerschule, whose works drew upon the newly prosperous middle-class for their inspiration and support.

Taking into account the places where they might eventually be hung, his paintings were mostly in smaller formats. They made use of the Tyrolean Alps and Black Forest for their backgrounds and often had a medieval flavor. Many were mildly humorous, but he always strove to accommodate the tastes of his audience.

His breakthrough came in 1859 with what is still one of his most popular works, "Wedding Procession on the Rhine". A steel engraving was made by Friedrich Oldermann (1802–1874), and it was widely distributed. Several other versions of the original motif followed. Its success attracted imitators and outright plagiarism. An Austrian landscape painter, Franz Richard Unterberger, copied most of the staffage and the architecture for his 1865 painting, "Wedding in the Harbor". The original may now be found in the Brooklyn Museum of New York.

For several years, he was a teacher at the Kunstakademie. A lengthy trip to Spain in the 1860s prompted him to paint larger works with Spanish themes, but they never became popular. He died in Merano, Italy, where he had been staying at a spa in an effort to improve his poor health.

== Selected paintings ==
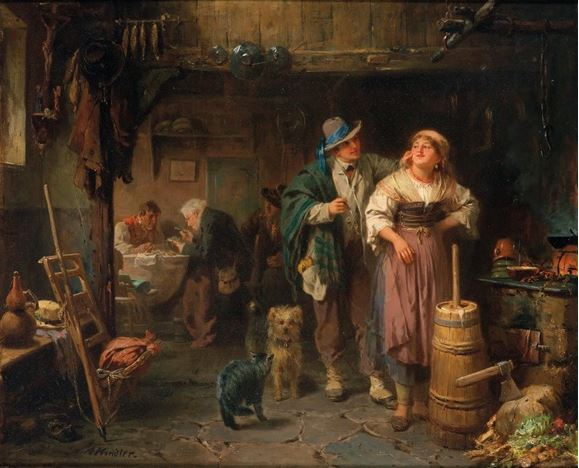
In the Tavern Kitchen

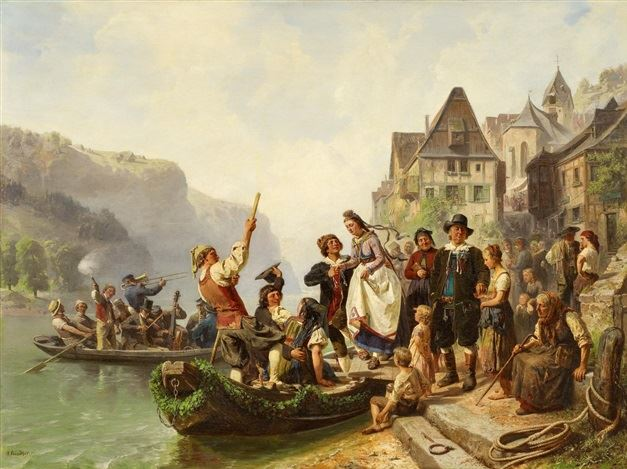
Wedding Procession on the Rhine

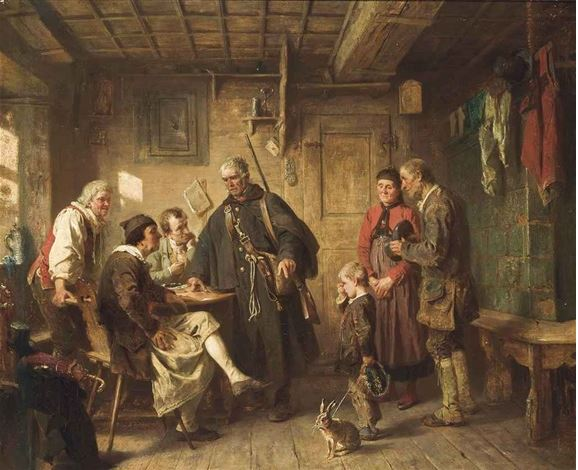
Dispute Over a Hare
