= Rudolf Jordan (painter) =

German painter

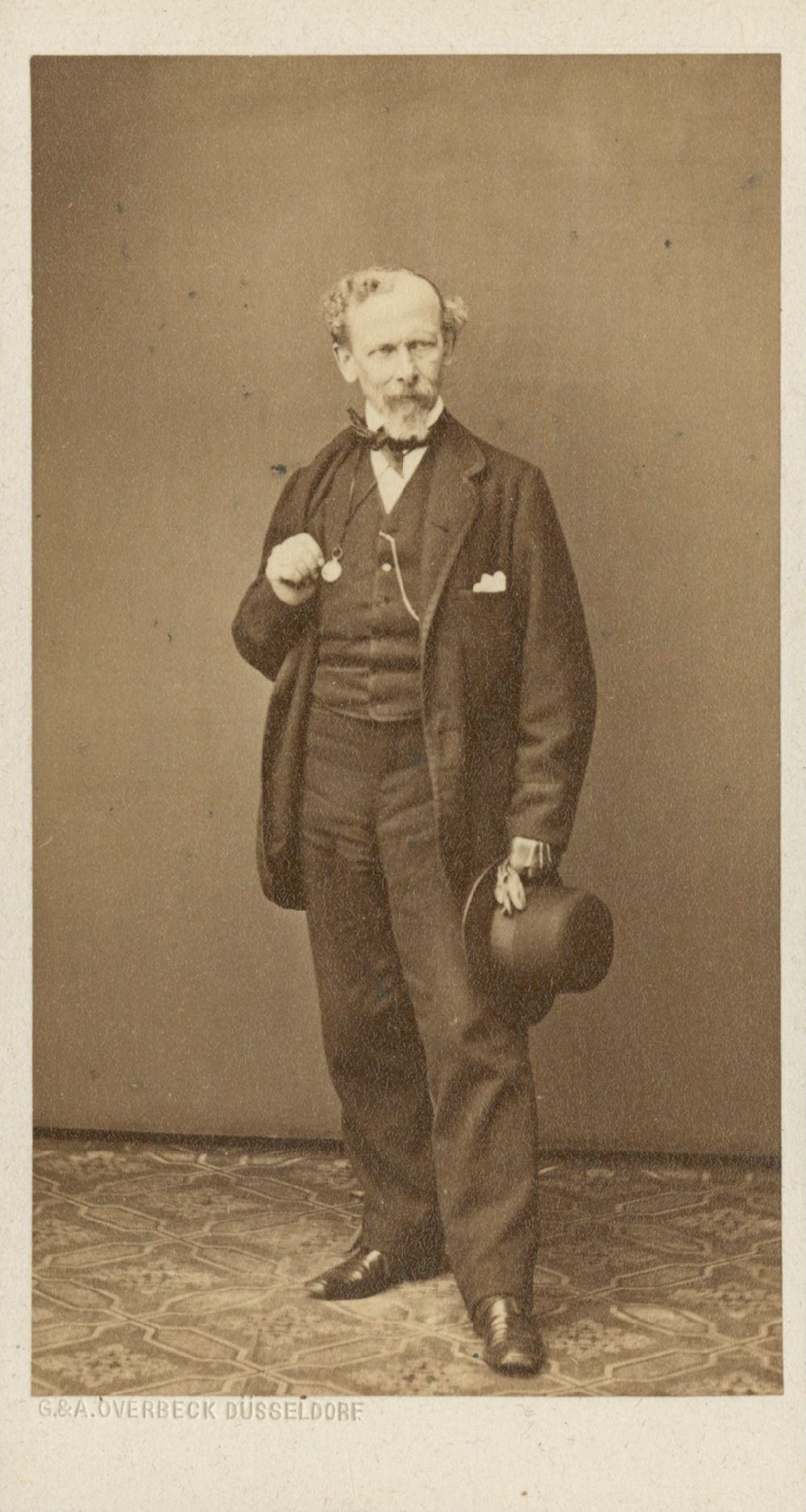
Rudolf Jordan by G. & A. Overbeck (firm), c. 1868

Wilhelm Rudolf Jordan (4 May 1810 – 20 March 1887) was a German genre painter, illustrator, etcher and art teacher.

== Biography ==
He was born in Berlin. His father was a member of the Judicial Council and he was a descendant of Charles-Étienne Jordan, advisor to Frederick the Great. After completing his basic artistic studies with Karl Wilhelm Wach at his private school in Berlin, Jordan moved to the Kunstakademie Düsseldorf, where he took master classes with Friedrich Wilhelm Schadow and Karl Ferdinand Sohn. In 1837, he became a member of the Prussian Academy of Arts.

He graduated from the Kunstakademie in 1840 and, from 1848, operated his own studio; creating genre scenes and giving lessons. He is considered to be one of the founders of the ethnographic approach to genre painting. During this time, he was named a "Titularprofessor"; a largely honorary title.

After 1843, following the success of his painting Heiratsantrag auf Helgoland (Marriage Proposal in Helgoland), he devoted himself mostly to portraying fisherman and sailors, which involved frequent journeys to Belgium, Holland and France. Many of these works became popular and were widely disseminated as lithographs and engravings.

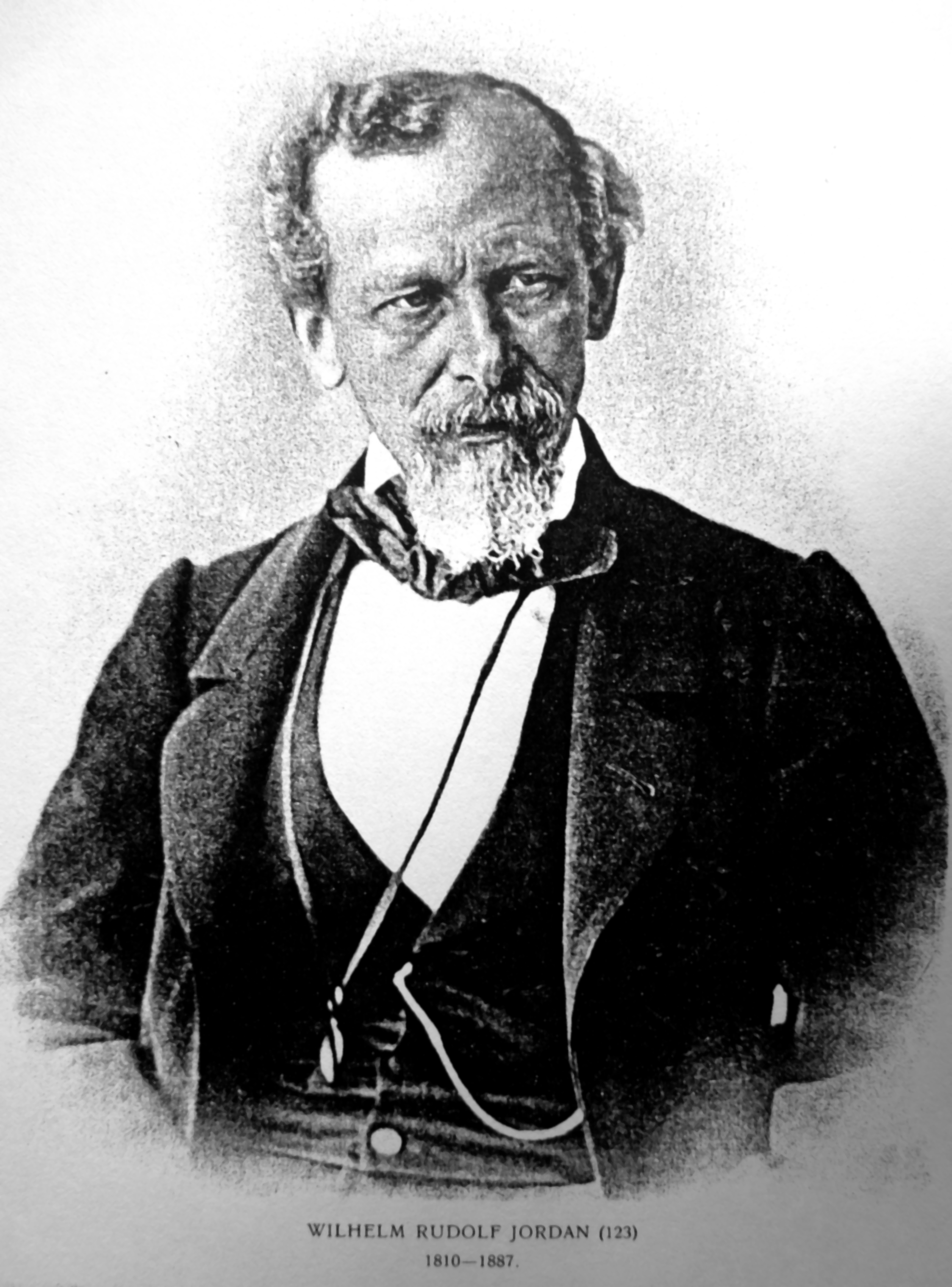
Rudolf Jordan (c.1880)

In 1848, he was one of the founders of "Malkasten", a progressive art society in Düsseldorf. That same year, during the Revolution, he served as a member of the Bürgerwehr (Vigilance committee) under Commander Lorenz Clasen, also a painter by profession.

In 1869, he was awarded the Order of the Red Eagle. A year before his death, he was presented with the Order of the Crown. He was also a recipient of the Commander's Cross in the Order of Vasa. He died in Düsseldorf.

His first wife, Sophie von Mülmann (1811–1863), was a painter of some note.

== Notable students ==
- Anton Dieffenbach
- Ernestine Friedrichsen
- Albert Kindler
- Heinrich Ludwig Philippi
- Henry Ritter
- Raphael Ritz
- Emil Gottlieb Schuback
- Richard Sohn
- Benjamin Vautier
- Josef Wilhelm Wallander

== Selected illustrations and paintings ==
More digitalized illustrations may be found in the corresponding article on German Wikipedia

- K. Stieler, H. Wachenhusen, F.W. Hackländer: Rheinfahrt. Von den Quellen des Rheins bis zum Meere. (From the Source of the Rhine to the Sea), Kröner, Stuttgart 1875. Digitalized online
- Johann Karl Musäus and Julius Ludwig Klee (eds.). Volksmährchen der Deutschen. (Popular Tales) with woodcuts and original drawings, Mayer und Wigand, Leipzig 1842. Digitalized online
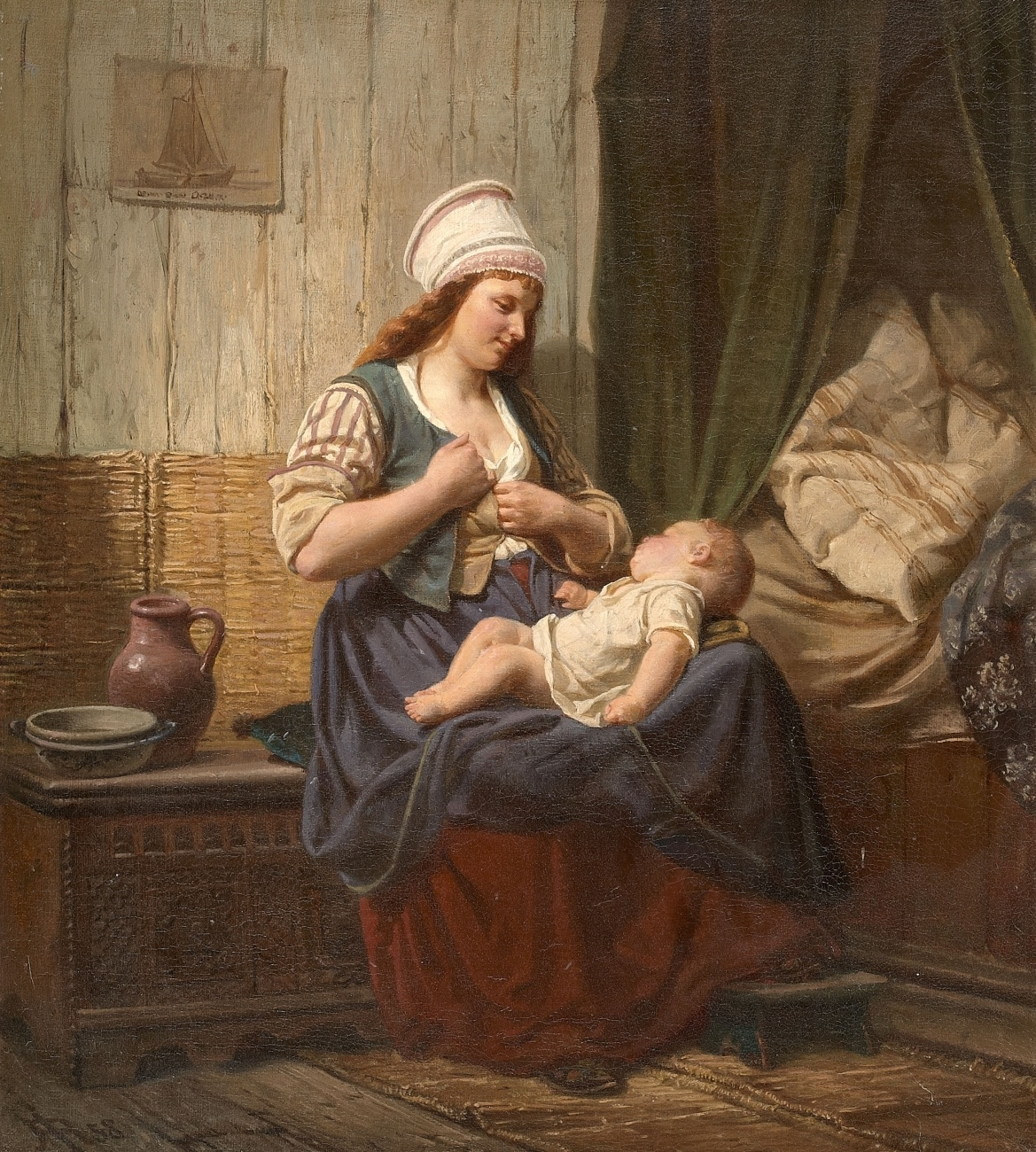
Mother and Child

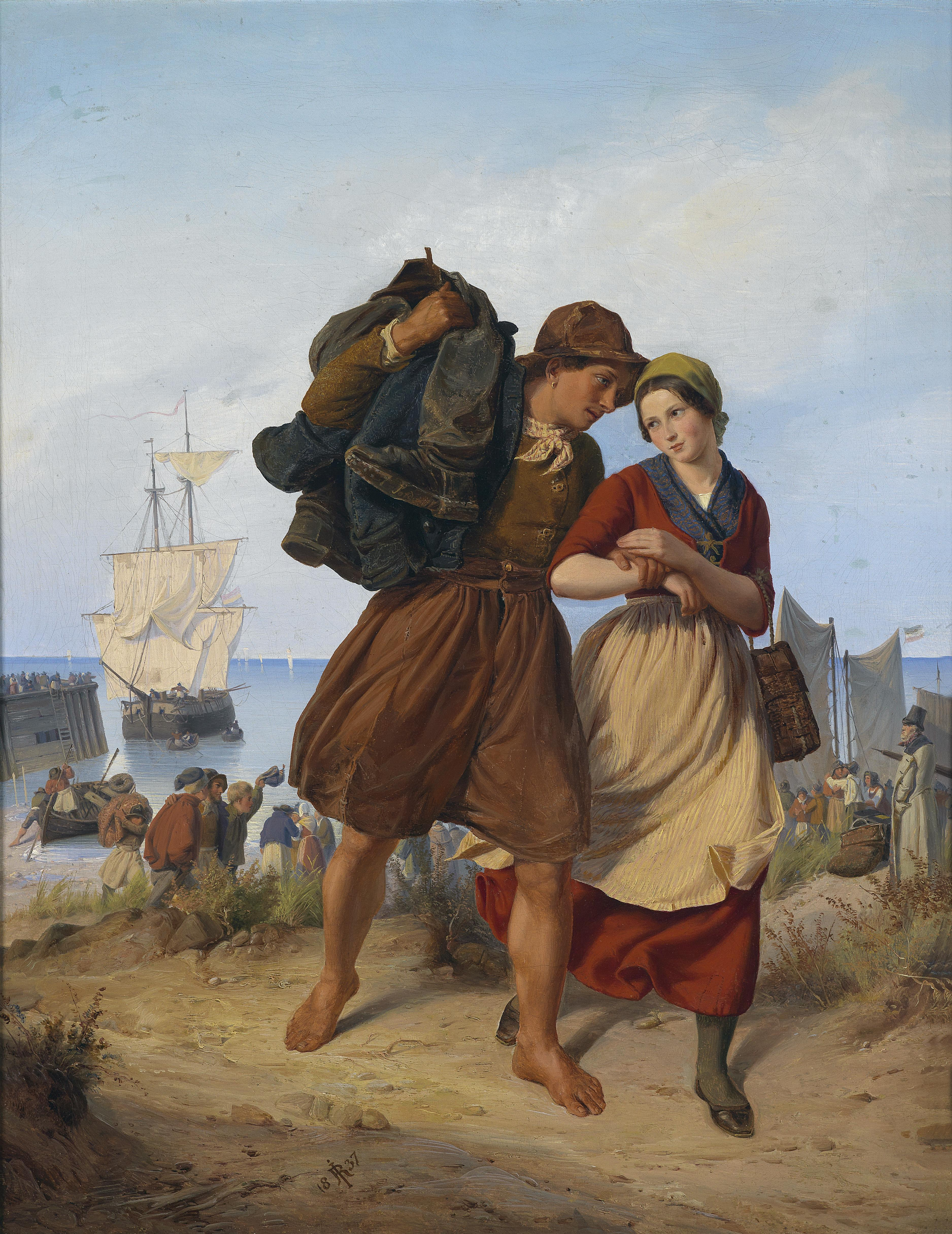
The Fishermen's Homecoming

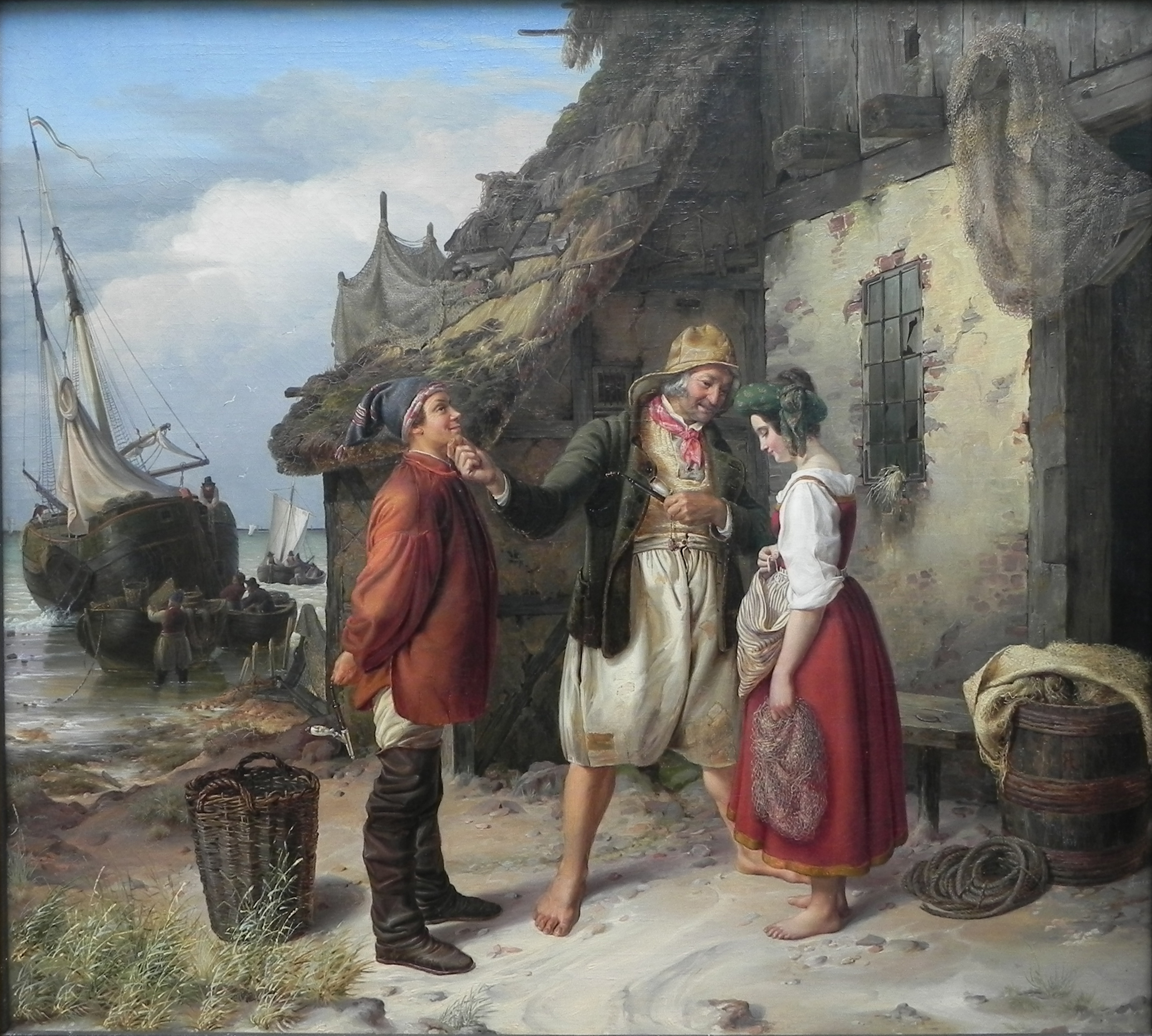
Marriage Proposal in Helgoland

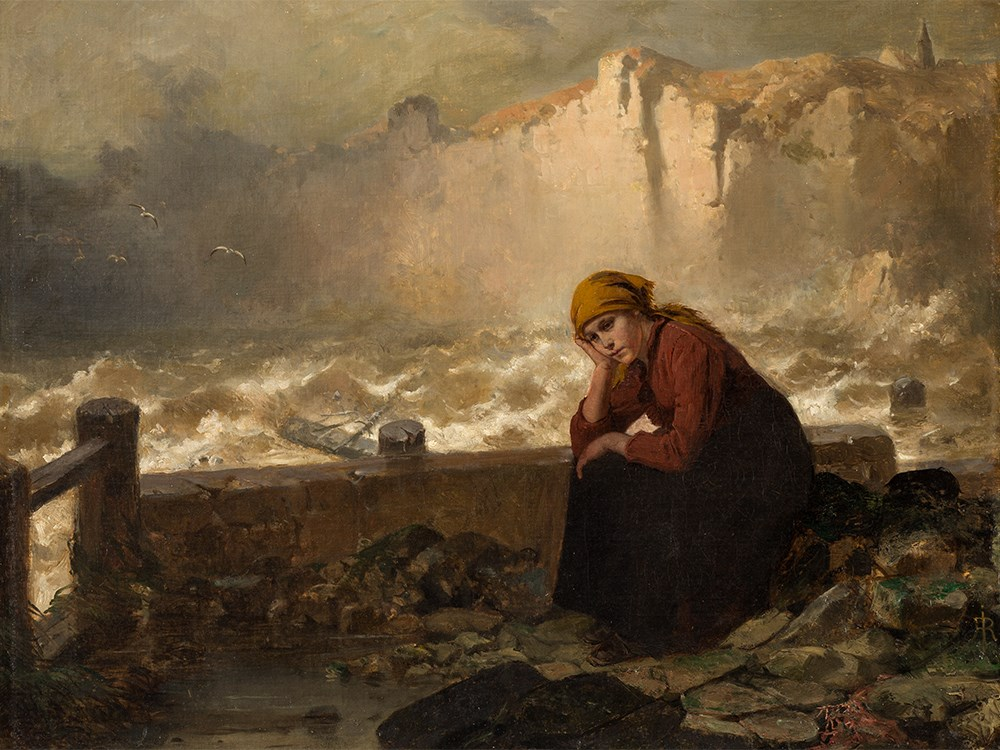
The Cliffs

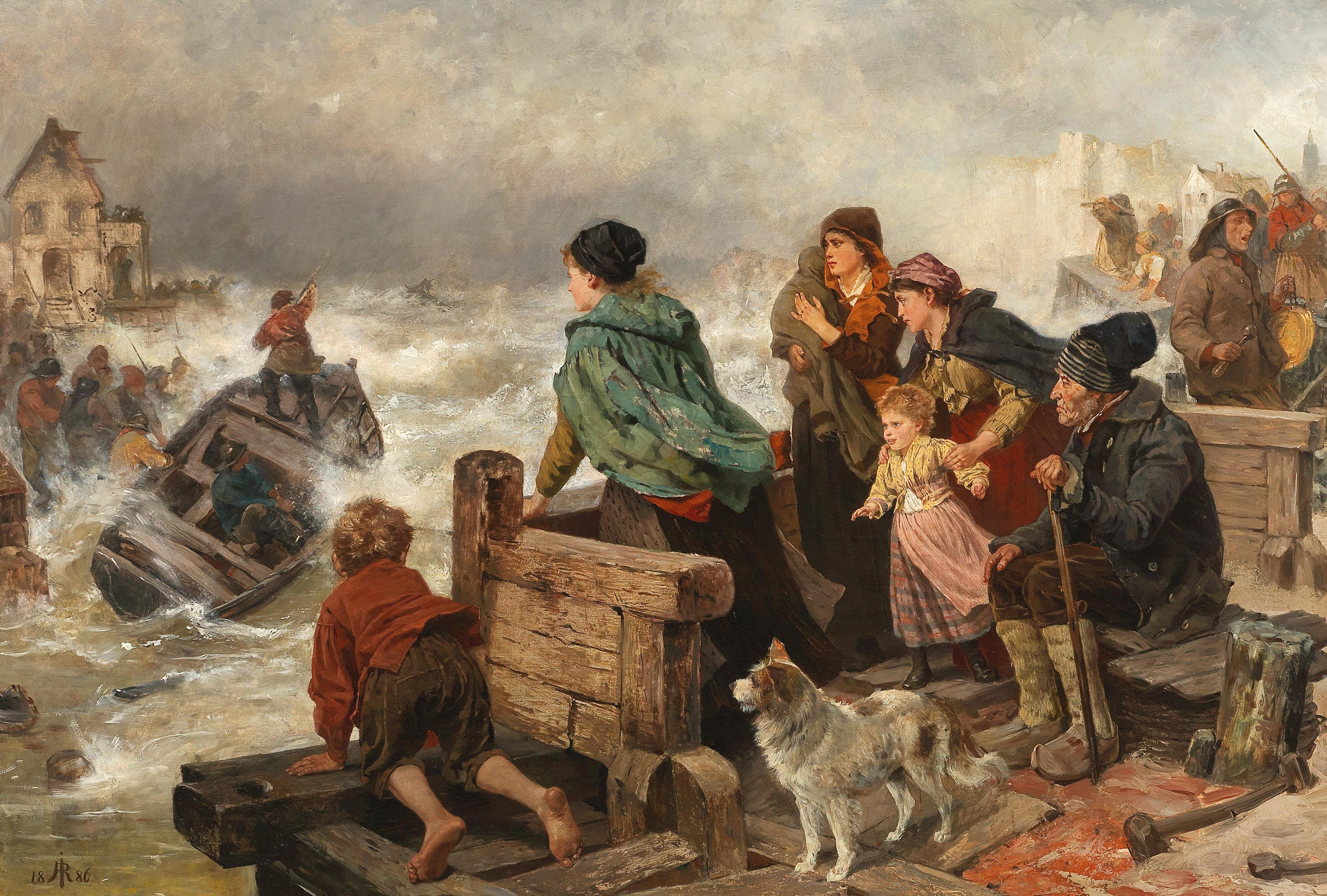
Storm by the Coast

== Sources ==
- "Jordan, Rudolf". In: Hermann Alexander Müller: Biographisches Künstler-Lexikon. Die bekanntesten Zeitgenossen auf dem Gebiet der bildenden Künste aller Länder mit Angabe ihrer Werke. Bibliographisches Institut, Leipzig 1882
- "Jordan, Rudolf". In: Thieme-Becker, Allgemeines Lexikon der Bildenden Künstler von der Antike bis zur Gegenwart. Vol.19, E. A. Seemann, Leipzig 1926, pgs.161–162.
- Hans Paffrath/Kunstmuseum Düsseldorf: Lexikon der Düsseldorfer Malerschule. Vol.2, Bruckmann, München 1998, ISBN 3-7654-3010-2, pgs.193–196
