= Carl Gehrts =

German painter (1853–1898)

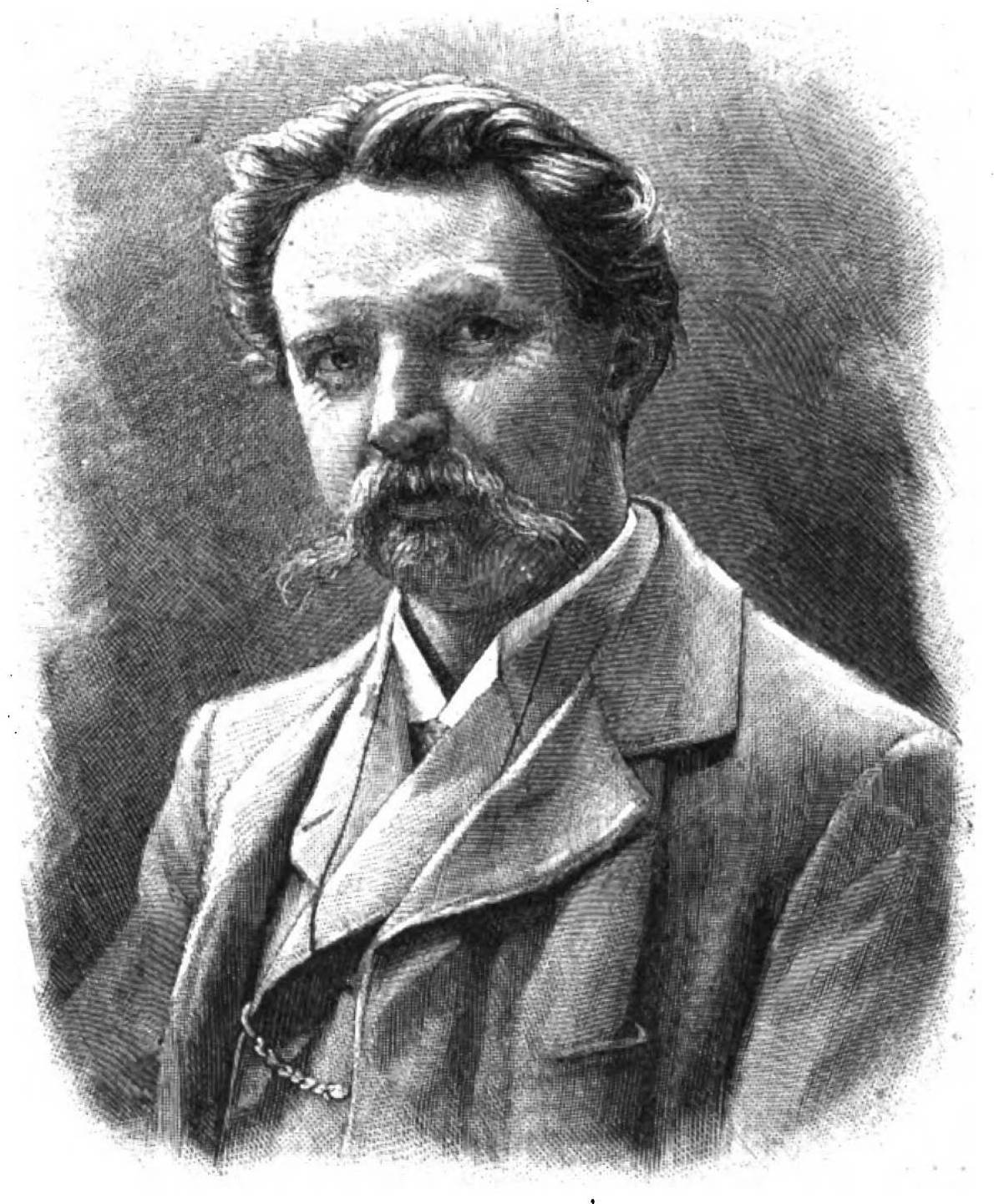
Carl Gehrts

Carl Gehrts, also Karl Gehrts, complete name Karl Heinrich Julius Gehrts (11 May 1853 – 17 July 1898) was a German painter, illustrator and academic scholar. As a professor, he taught at the Kunstakademie Düsseldorf.

== Life ==
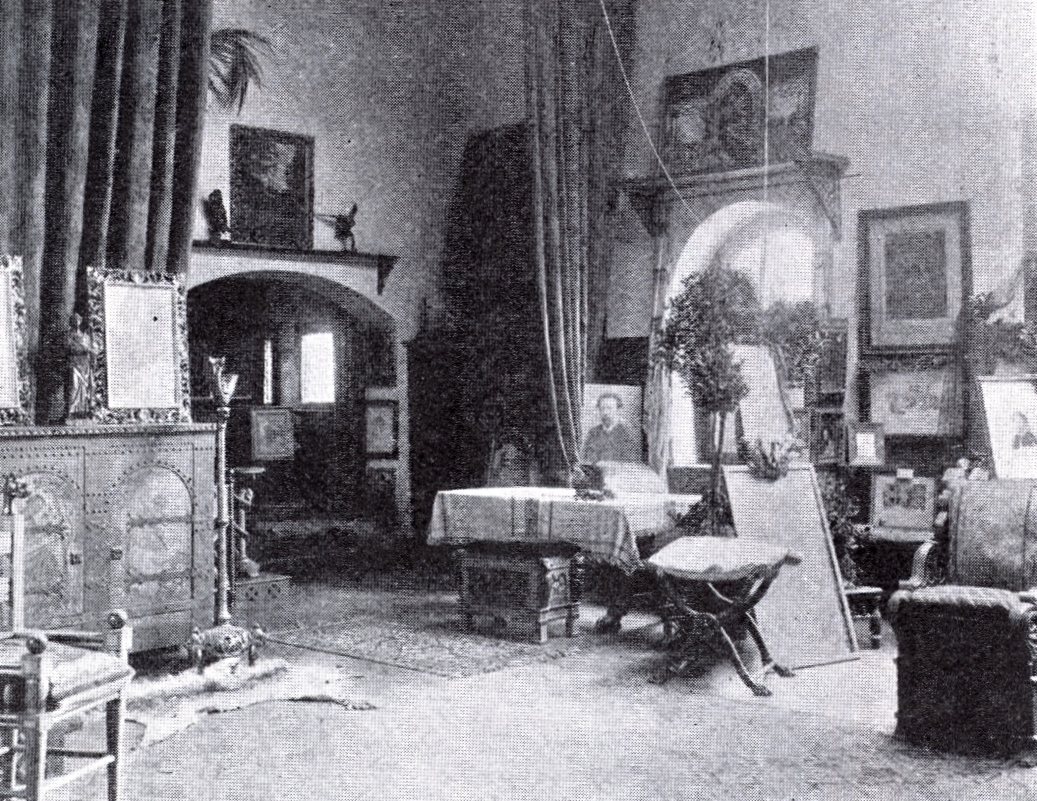
Gehrts' Atelier in the Villa Waldfrieden

Born in St. Pauli near Hamburg Gehrts, son of a Hamburg master painter, was the elder brother of the painters and illustrators Johannes Gehrts and Franz Gehrts. After attending the Hamburg Gewerbeschule in the evenings, where he was taught by Friedrich Heimerdinger, among others, he studied with the help of scholarships at the Kunstakademie Weimar under Ferdinand Brütt, Karl Gussow and Albert Baur from 1871. He followed his teacher Baur to Düsseldorf in 1876. There he worked as a history, landscape, portrait and genre painter. He was a friend of Emil Zeiß. He had close artistic contact with August Wittig, who taught sculpture at the Düsseldorf Academy of Arts, and in later years also with the illustrator Heinrich Otto. Gehrts found social connections in the circle of the writer Sophie Hasenclever, wife of the writer Richard Hasenclever and daughter of Friedrich Wilhelm von Schadow, as well as in the Malkasten, of which he was a member. In 1879 he married Anna Koettgen (1855–1901), the daughter of the painter Gustav Adolf Koettgen, a landscape painter and craftswoman who had become his private pupil from 1877. Gehrt's daughter Erna (1881–1957) married in her first marriage Hans Erich Hoesch (1881–1920), co-owner of the ironworks Eberhard Hoesch & Söhne, after whose death in second marriage Willy Hopp (1878–1957), factory owner and chairman of the supervisory board of the Hoesch AG.

His private studio was in his home, the Villa Waldfrieden in the Düsseldorf suburb of Rath, which he had built by the Düsseldorf architect Carl Wilhelm Schleicher. Gehrts was a popular and busy artist until he died of a nervous condition at the Schumannhaus Bonn in Endenich near Bonn in 1898 at the age of 45.

== Work ==
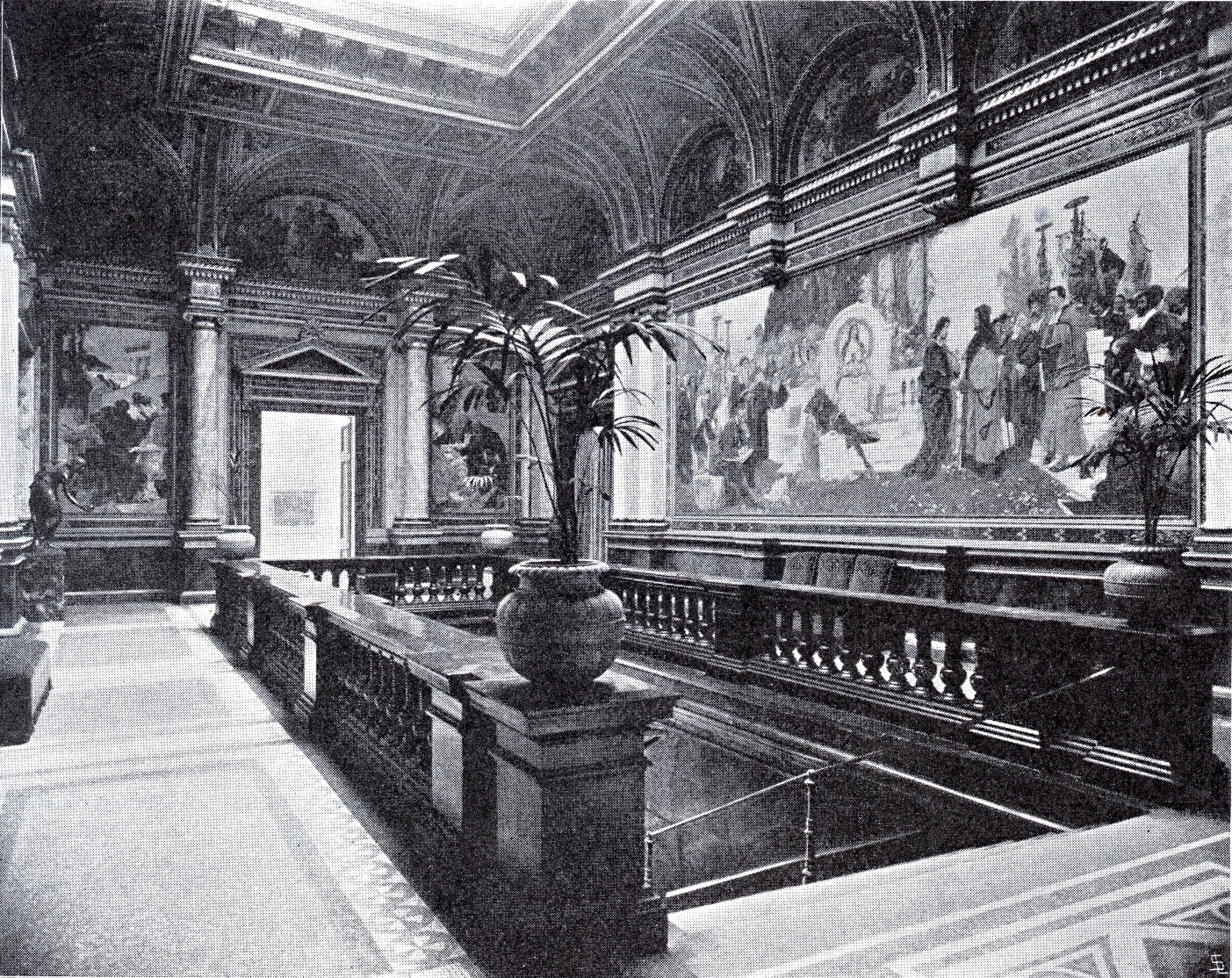
Kunsthalle Düsseldorf, Staircase, on the right the mural Die Kunst in der Renaissance

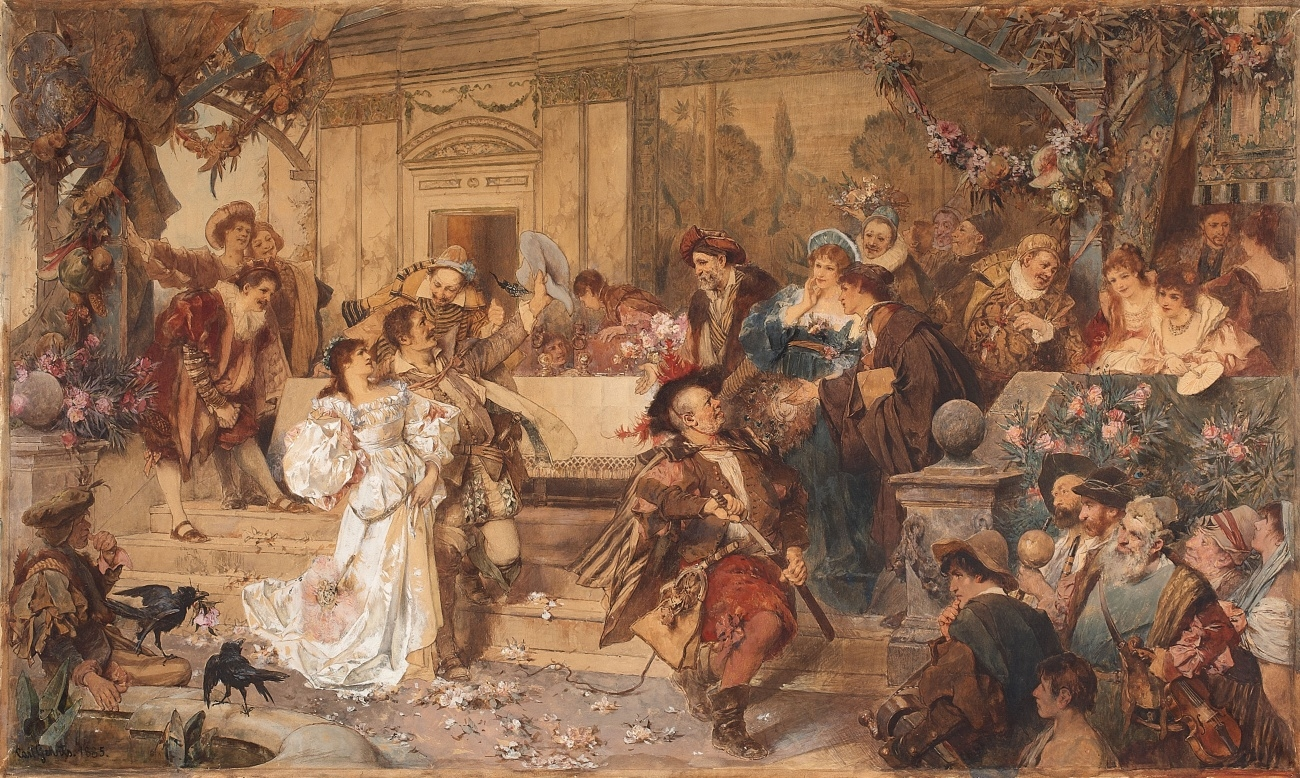
Hochzeit des Petrucchio, watercolor, 1885

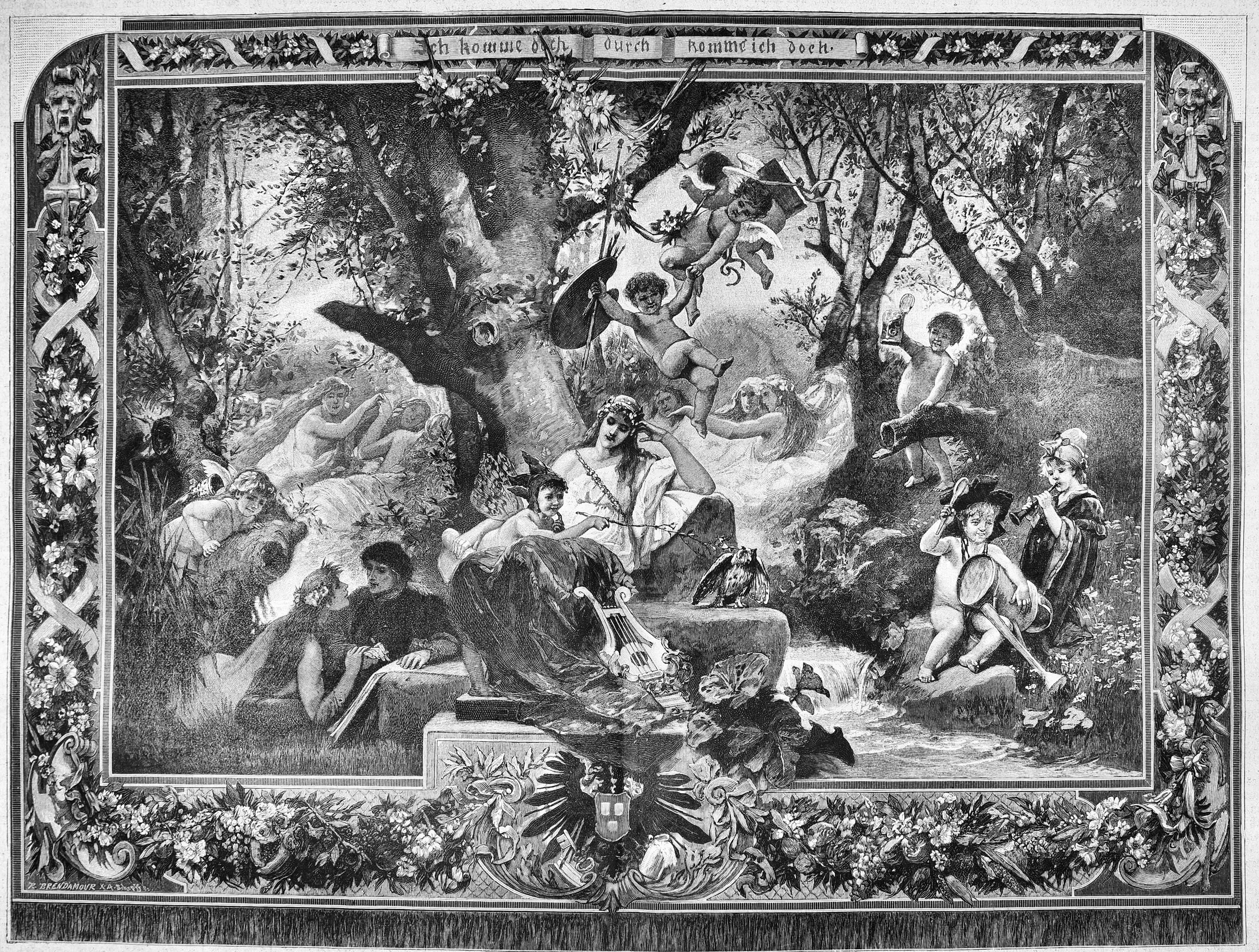
The new curtain of the Malkastenbühne, illustration in Die Gartenlaube, 1894

Gehrts became known above all for his decorative paintings, colour glazing and book and jewellery graphics. His main work is considered to be the cycle of paintings for the upper floor of the staircase of the old Düsseldorf Kunsthalle with the murals Die Kunst im Alterthum and Die Kunst in der Renaissance, which were celebrated by contemporaries. Gehrts was also active as an illustrator for books and magazines, for example for the Fliegende Blätter and Die Gartenlaube. His figures of brownies, gnomes, mermaids and elves, which he developed from legends and fairy tales, were particularly popular. Among his watercolours, the work Wedding of Petrucchio stands out. Through the mediation of his patron, the Hamburg export merchant Arnold Otto Meyer, he also received some commissions in Hamburg and the surrounding area, such as three coloured glazings for the windows of the Bürgerschaftsaal in the Hamburg City Hall.

After the end of historism, his work was quite critically evaluated. The Art journal Die Kunst und das schöne Heim characterised him in 1901 as the "last romantic among German illustrators". In 2015, an exhibition by the Dr. Axe-Stiftung under the title Carl Gehrts und die Düsseldorfer Malerschule in Dahlem-Kronenburg presented a part of his works as well as pictures of his contemporaries from the Düsseldorf school of painting.

- Die Ankunft des Seeräubers Störtebecker in Hamburg, 1876
- Das Gastmahl des Grafen Gero, 1876
- Ein Narrenkrieg im Burgsaale, Illustration, 1879
- Das Gastmahl des Hiero, 1879–1882
- Allegorical and ornamental wall decorations of the art exhibition and the textile and machinery hall on the Gewerbe- und Kunstausstellung Düsseldorf 1880, together with Karl Rudolf Sohn as well as Ernst and Fritz Roeber.
- Stahl und Eisen, Illustration, 1881
- Hochzeit des Petrucchio, watercolor, 1885
- Bismarck-Adresse des Künstlervereins „Malkasten“ in Düsseldorf, 1885.
- Dezemberfest Malkasten 1887 Düsseldorf: „Eine Weltausstellung 1887 in der Seestadt Düsseldorf“, wood engraving 1887
- Four murals inside the Hotel-Restaurant Münker-Kaletsch (Café Central), Königsallee 32, 1887, realized by Oscar Wichtendahl and Franz Gehrts.
- Six allegorical murals on the main periods of art history in the Alte Kunsthalle Düsseldorf, including Die Kunst im Alterthum and Die Kunst in der Renaissance (als sich gegenüberstehende Pendants 1887 entworfen, frescoes between 1889 und 1897 damaged in 1942 by air raids during the Second World War, removed in 1944, then lost), there also 16 lunettes on thema Die Freuden und Leiden des Mägdleins Malerei
- Porträt des Bildhauers Clemens Buscher, sign. 6 January (18)92 CG, Stadtmuseum Landeshauptstadt Düsseldorf
- New curtain of the Malkastenbühne, 1894
- Orientalische Händler auf der Wartburg
