= Heimerdinger =

Heimerdinger is a surname. Notable people with the surname include:

- Chris Heimerdinger (born 1963), American author
- Friedrich Heimerdinger (1817–1882), German painter
- Mike Heimerdinger (1952–2011), American football coach
- Cecil B. Heimerdinger, a fictional character in League of Legends and Arcane (TV series)
