= Hasenclever =

Hasenclever is a German surname. Notable people with the surname include:

- Johann Peter Hasenclever (1810–1853), German painter
- Peter Hasenclever (1716–1793), German ironmaster, worked in New Jersey and New York
- Sophie Hasenclever (1823–1892), German poet and translator
- Walter Hasenclever (1890–1940), German writer
- Wilhelm Hasenclever (1837–1889), German politician
