= Brütt =

Brütt is a surname of German origin. Notable people with that name include:

- Adolf Brütt (1855-1939), German sculptor
- Ferdinand Brütt (1849-1936), German painter

== See also ==
- Pavel Brutt (born 1982), Russian cyclist
