= Johannes Gehrts =

19th century German illustrator

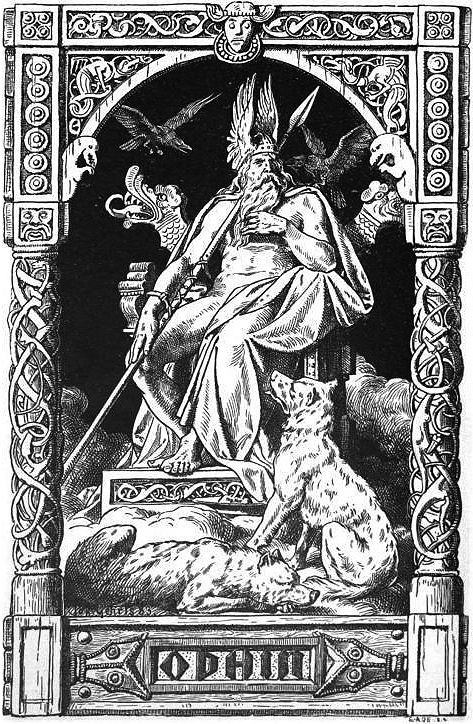
Odin flanked by his ravens Huginn and Muninn, and the wolves Geri and Freki (1901)

Johannes Gehrts (26 February 1855 – 1921), brother of Carl Gehrts (1853–1898), was a leading German illustrator whose work appeared in popular magazines such as Die Gartenlaube, in the design of children's books and in works of his friend Felix Dahn. He depicted scenes from Germanic and Norse mythology, legends and sagas, pirate stories, travel adventures and fairy-tales. He also illustrated reports on the scientific expeditions of the German physician and anthropologist Karl von den Steinen. During World War I, Gehrts produced a number of works, in dull blacks and grays, showing scenes from the front, a few of which became postcards.

Gehrts attended the art academy of Weimar from 1873 to 1876, and lived in Düsseldorf from 1884 onwards.

== Gallery ==
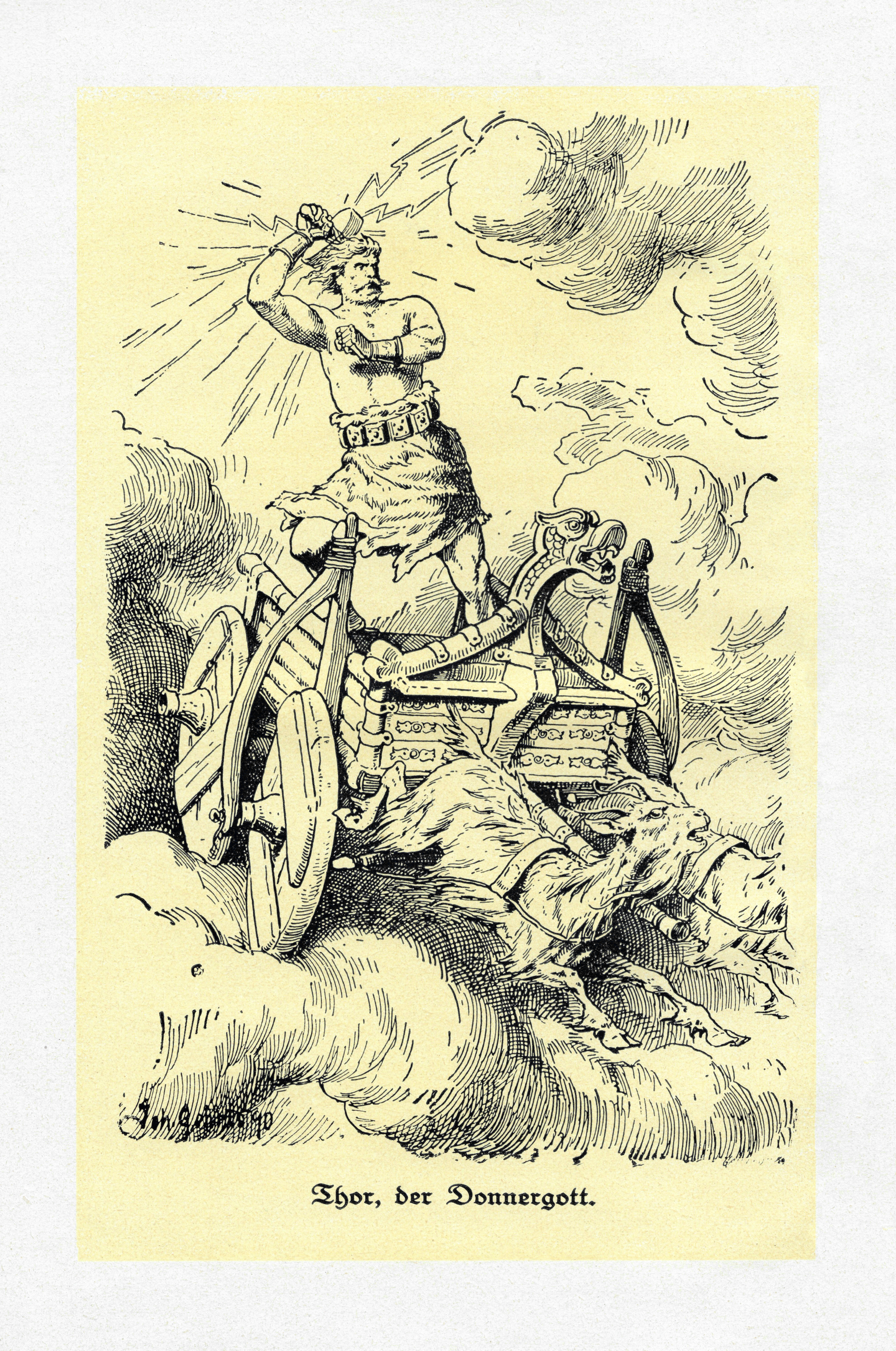
Thor, the thunder god

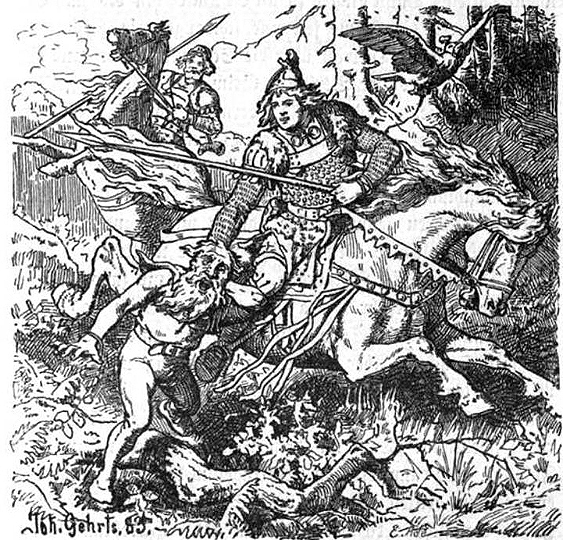
Dietrich catches the dwarf Alfrich (1883)

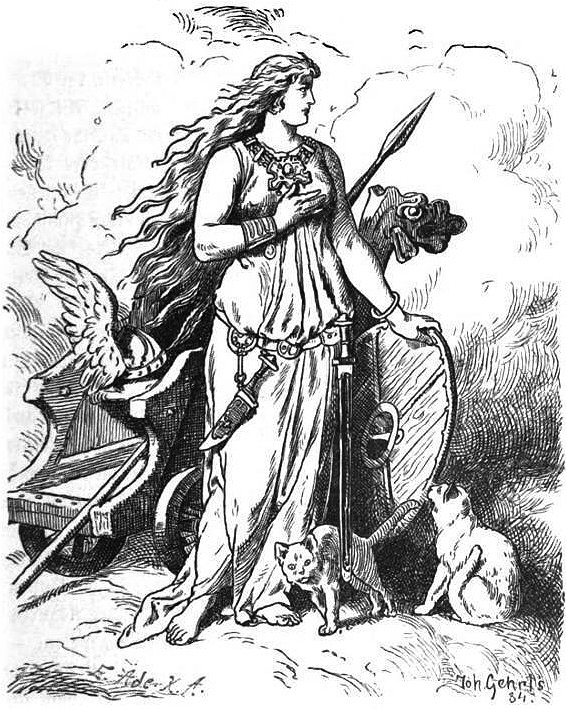
Freya

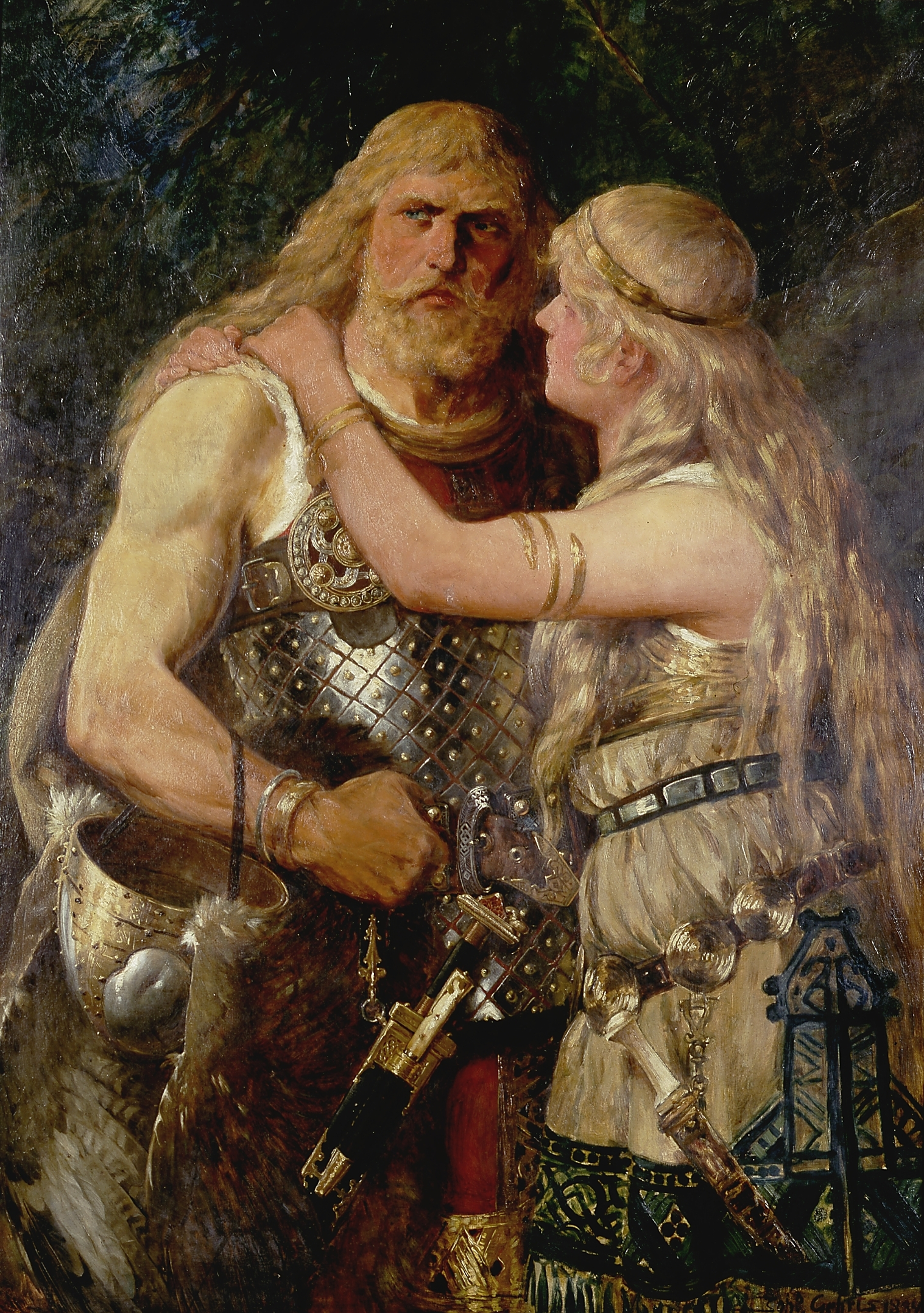
Arminius says goodbye to Thusnelda (1884)

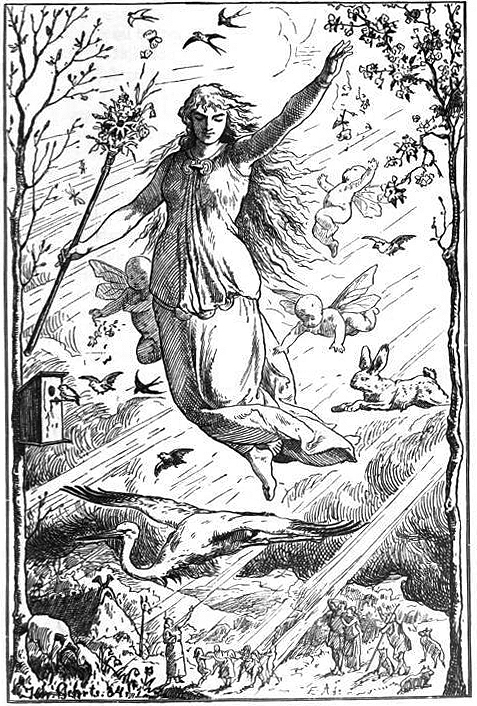
Ostara (1884)

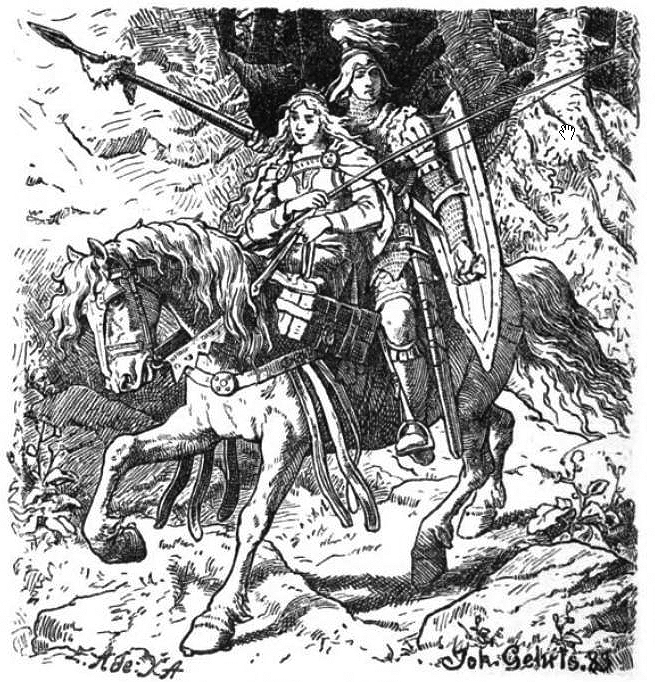
Walther and Hildegund on the run (1883)

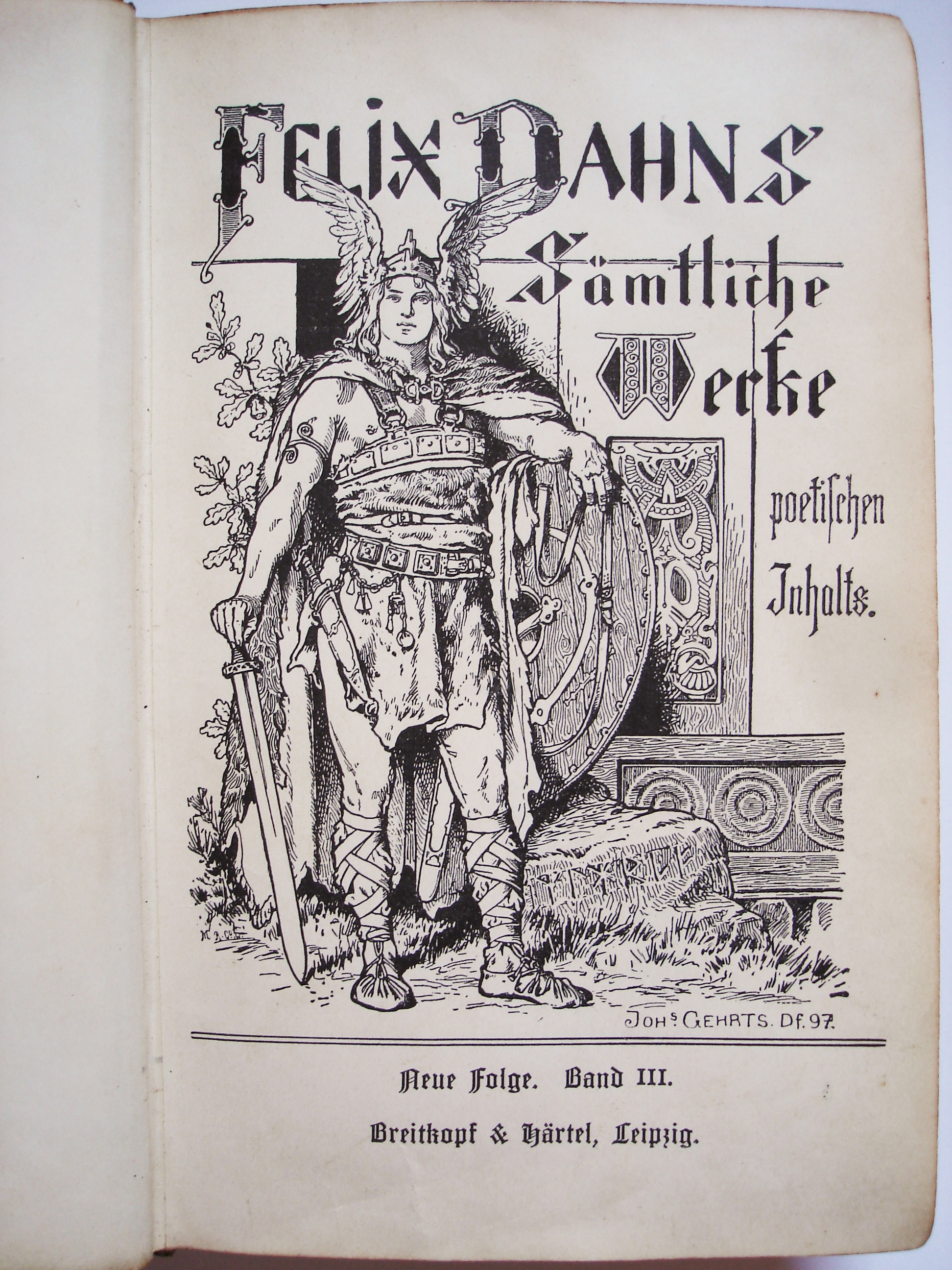
Title page for Felix Dahn's works

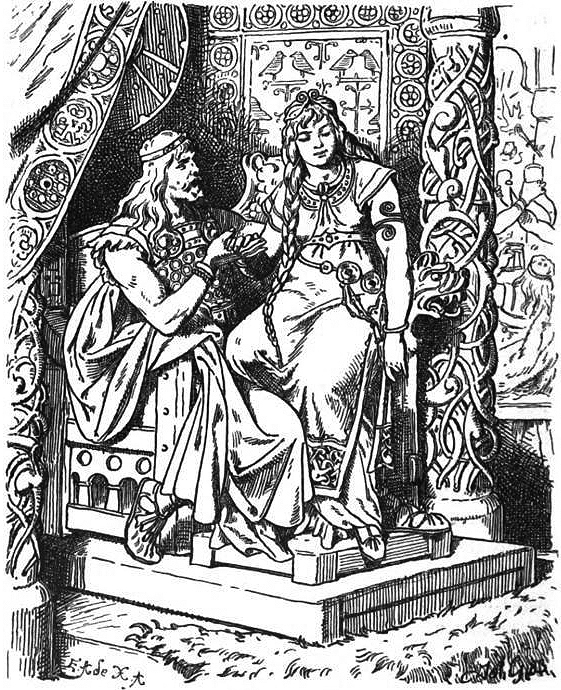
Oserich und Oda

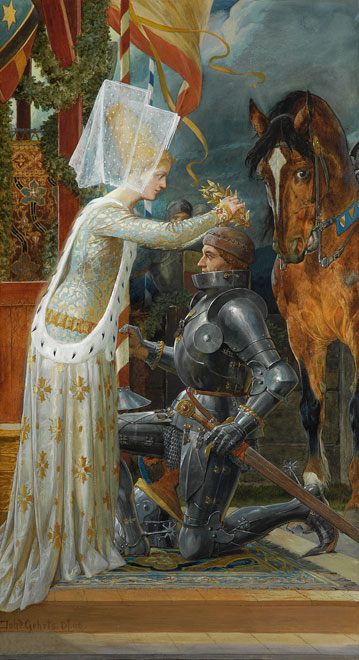
Ritter Ivanhoe

== See also ==
- List of German painters
