= Emil Zeiß =

German painter

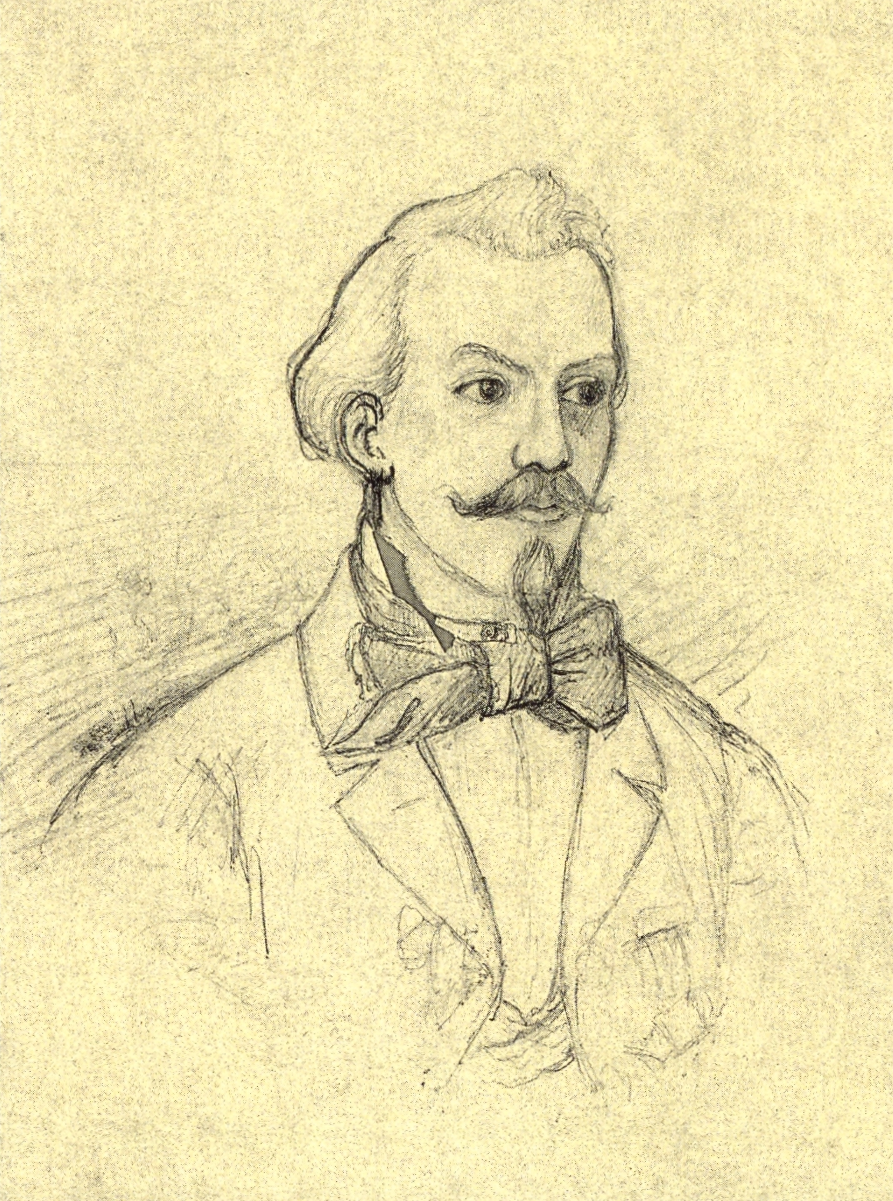
Emil Zeiß: Self-portrait from his student days

Emil Zeiß (2 July 1833 – 14 April 1910) was a German Protestant minister and painter. His body of work includes 33 sketchbooks and 1092 identified individual works, largely donated by his son to the Lippe Museum.

== Life ==
Zeiß was born in the village of Stapelage (now part of Lage) in the Principality of Lippe. He attended the University of Marburg. On 30 November 1859 he was admitted as a candidate for ministry in the Reformed church after passing the first theological examination. Three years later, on 12 November 1862 he passed the second theological examination. He was called to be a pastor for the Church of Lippe in Barntrup and stayed there for two decades.

In 1904 he suffered a stroke and a year later he retired. He died in 1910 in Schwalenberg, where his son, Alexander Zeiß held a pastorate from 1885 to 1938.

== Work ==
Zeiß worked mainly in watercolors and pencil, but there are some oil paintings. His main subjects are architecture, town views and landscapes from 1860 to 1880. Although he occasionally gave paintings to friends and relatives, he could not be persuaded to participate in exhibitions during his lifetime, despite requests to do so. He was friends with the painter Carl Gehrts (1853–1898). Today, Zeiß's many paintings of towns and villages in the Lippe area are important sources of local and regional history, showing the towns and villages before the advent of industrialization.
