= Sophie Hasenclever =

German poet and translator

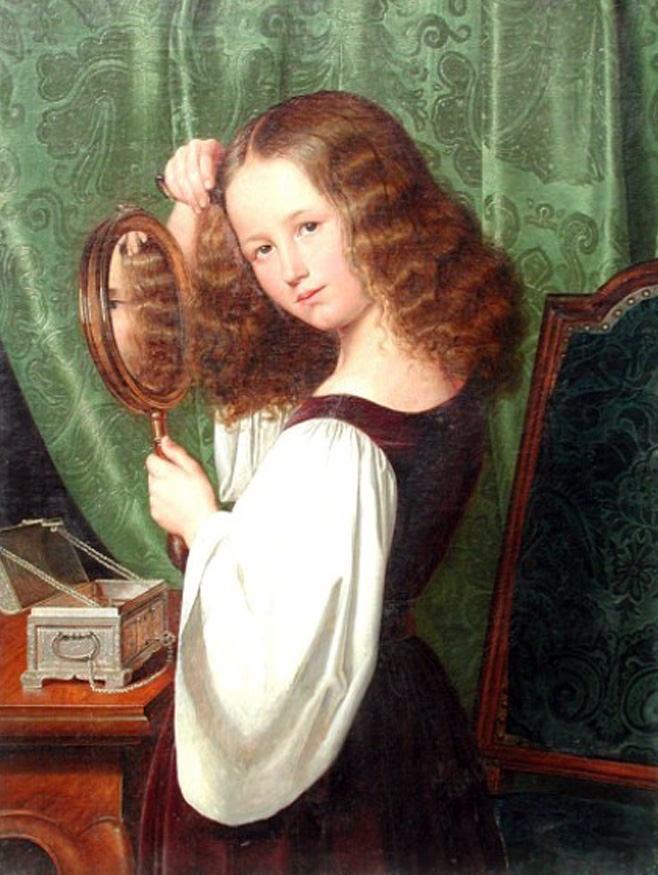
Sophie von Schadow painted by her father, Wilhelm von Schadow, 1833

Sophie Hasenclever (6 January 1823 as Sophie von Schadow – 10 May 1892) was a German poet and translator.

== Life ==
Sophie von Schadow was born in Berlin, the only daughter of Wilhelm von Schadow and his wife Charlotte von Groschke, who came from Kurland. Her father was a professor at the Prussian Academy of Arts at the time of her birth and became director of the Kunstakademie Düsseldorf in 1826. Sophie von Schadow grew up in the Düsseldorf artistic milieu. In her parents' house at Flinger Steinweg (today Schadowstraße) 54, the painters of the Düsseldorf school of painting, writers and composers socialised, including Felix Mendelssohn Bartholdy, who lived in the neighbourhood for several years. Von Schadow, who painted his daughter's portrait several times, gave her painting lessons in person. At the age of six, Sophie travelled to Italy with her parents for the first time, and ten years later, for the second time in Rome, she learned the Italian language.

In 1845, at the age of 21, she married the doctor Richard Hasenclever, who was Sanitätsrat from 1847. The couple lived in Grevenbroich until 1848, where he worked as district doctor. Richard Hasenclever was variously active artistically, as a writer and politically, and later became a co-founder of the Old Catholic movement and a member of the Reichstag. The couple had two children, Anna (b. 1846) and Felix (1851–1892). Their son later joined the navy and became a corvette captain and naval attaché. Their daughter Anna married the merchant Eduard Paniel (1849–1907) in 1877. For the two decades after the birth of her children, Sophie Hasenclever did not appear in public as a poet, but devoted herself to family life, which corresponded to the social expectations of married women. In fact, Sophie Hasenclever worked on her own poetry and translations even during the family phase.

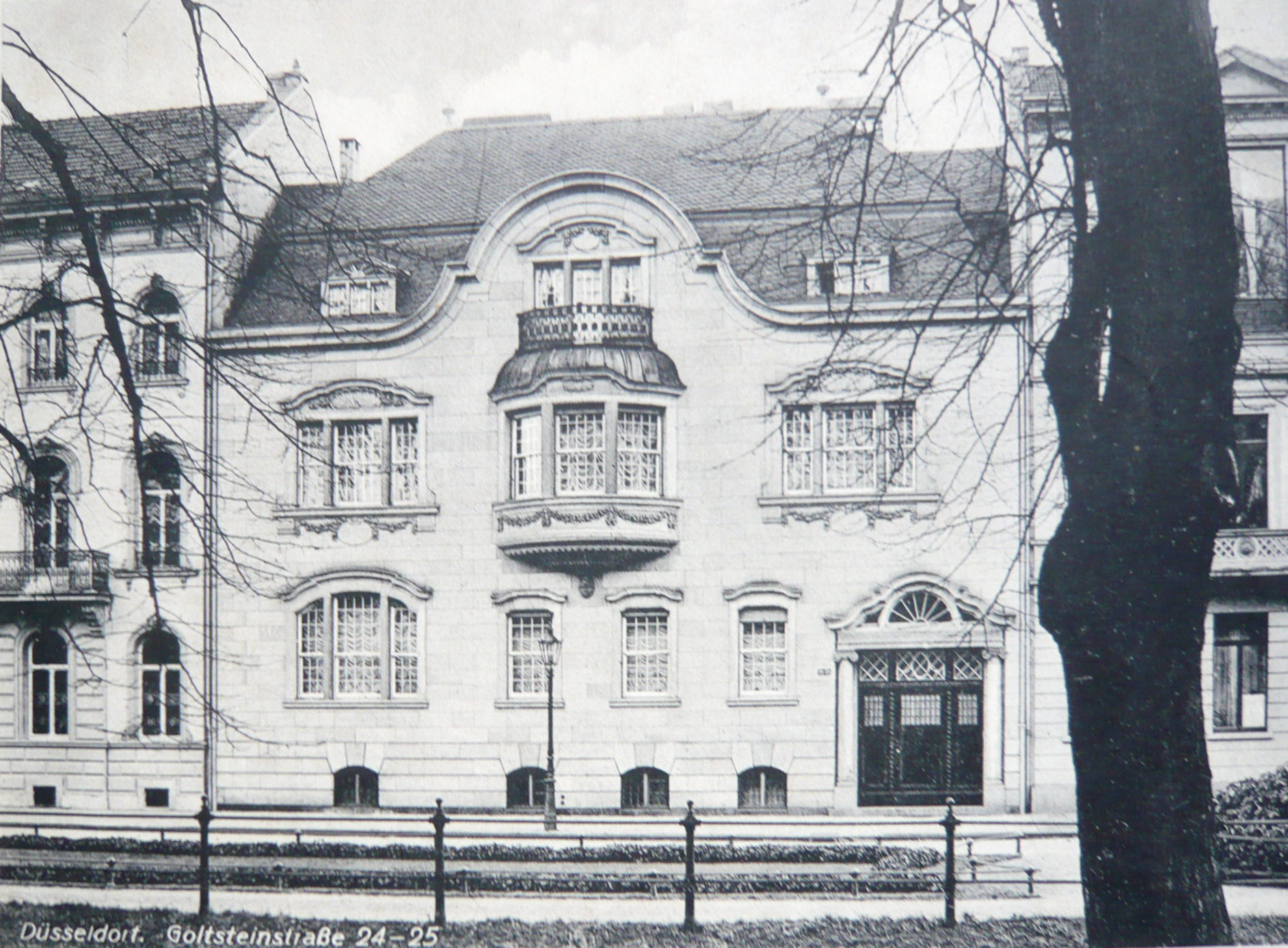
Goltsteinstraße 24

In Düsseldorf, they lived at Hofgartenstraße 8 until the early 1860s, also the death house of their father in 1862. Later, they had a house at Goltsteinstraße 24. Direct neighbours at the end of the 19th century were the family of the painter Karl Rudolf Sohn and the Else Sohn-Rethel. The older sculptor August Wittig lived in the Hasenclevers' house and around 1880 the painter Hermann Schmiechen. Here she and her husband ran a künstlerisch-literarischen Salon where many greats of the time came and went, among them the poet Karl Immermann and Gottfried Keller, as well as the composers Ferdinand Hiller, Robert Schumann and the composer and pianist Clara Schumann. The painter Carl Gehrts found social connections in the circle of the writer Hasenclever.

In 1873, her husband, together with like-minded people, founded the Old Catholic Association, from which the Old Catholic Church congregation in Düsseldorf emerged. Sophie Hasenclever joined, "following her conscience, out of full conviction" - said Pastor Wilhelm Schirmer at her funeral.

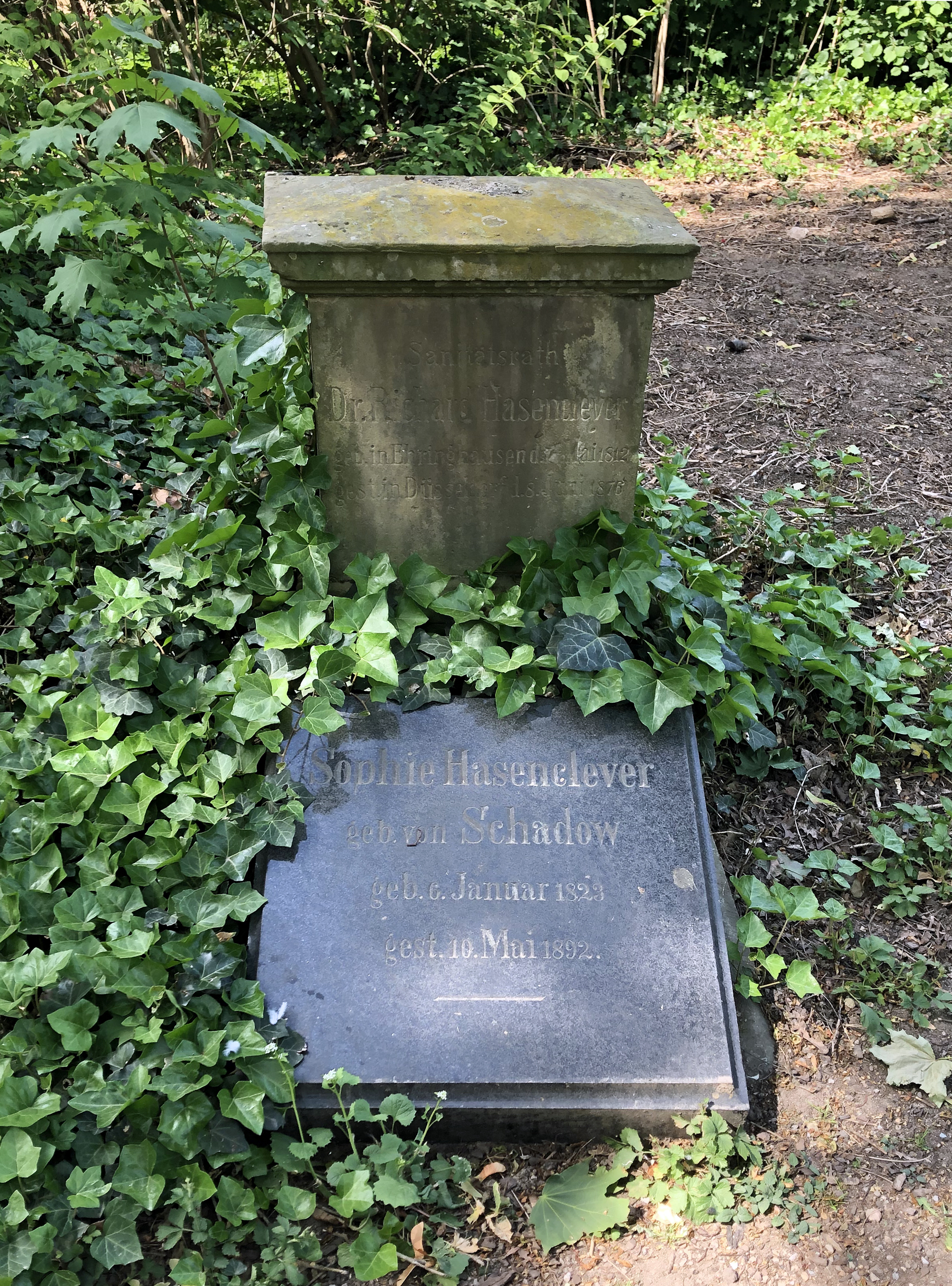
Grave site of Sophie and Richard Hasenclever (2020)

In 1892, Hasenclever died in Düsseldorf at the age of 68, leaving behind a wealth of unpublished manuscripts. Her grave is located at the Golzheimer Friedhof.

== Work ==
Among Hasenclever's works are various poems critical of civilisation, and her novellas are often about man who must prove himself in a crisis situation. Many of her poems, fairy tales, comedies and satires have remained unpublished. In part, she wrote under the pseudonym S. Rolant including the historical novel Geisterschlacht. Hasenclever also made a name for herself as a translator. She mastered not only the Italian but also the French language. Over the years, she produced translations with her own introductions, in which she classified the respective work in terms of literary history.

From the 1870s onwards, Sophie Hasenclever published, among others, the novelette, Aus der Kriegszeit 1870-71 (From the War of 1870–71) and the poetry collection Rheinische Lieder (Rhenish Songs), which were widely acclaimed. The literary historian Heinrich Groß attested Sophie Hasenclever with this collection "a lasting place in German literature". In 1874, her translation of the poems of the Breton poet Auguste Brizeux appeared. In 1875, on the occasion of the 400th anniversary of Michelangelo's birth, she presented a translation of his entire poetic oeuvre, which she had worked on for a full decade and which is still not outdated today.

In addition to nature hymns and poems critical of civilisation, in which she warned against advancing industrialisation, there were variations on love, loneliness and death. In the two-volume edition of her Novellen und Märchen published in 1884, which she dedicated to the Swiss writer Gottfried Keller, she thematised above all crisis and conflict situations in which people have to prove themselves.

She wrote the text for Mendelssohn-Bartholdy's Athalia, which was performed privately at the court of Karl Anton, Prince of Hohenzollern, who resided in Düsseldorf at the time. The composer Ferdinand Hiller added to his cantata for solos, choir and orchestra Nala und Damayanti is based on Hasenclever's adaptation of this Indian story. The story is about King Nala, who loses his kingdom through a passion for gambling and finally regains it, and about his faithful wife Damayanti. In preparation, Hasenclever had studied ancient Indian literature for years. In 1890 her translation of Dante's Divine Comedy.

== Work ==
- A. Briseux, Gedichte, translations, 1874
- Aus der Kriegszeit von 1870 bis 1871, Novellas, 1877
- Rheinische Lieder, poems, 1881
- Novellen und Märchen, 2 volumes, 1884
- Dantes Göttliche Komödie, translation 1889, hardcover edition, Felix Bagel, 1915
- Michelangelos Gedichte. Sämmtliche Gedichte Michelangelo's in Guasti's Text, mit deutscher Uebersetzung von Sophie Hasenclever, eingeführt durch M. Jordan. Dürr, Leipzig, 1875
- Michelangelo, Poesie album (Lyrikreihe), 1973
