= Albert Baur =

German painter (1835–1906)

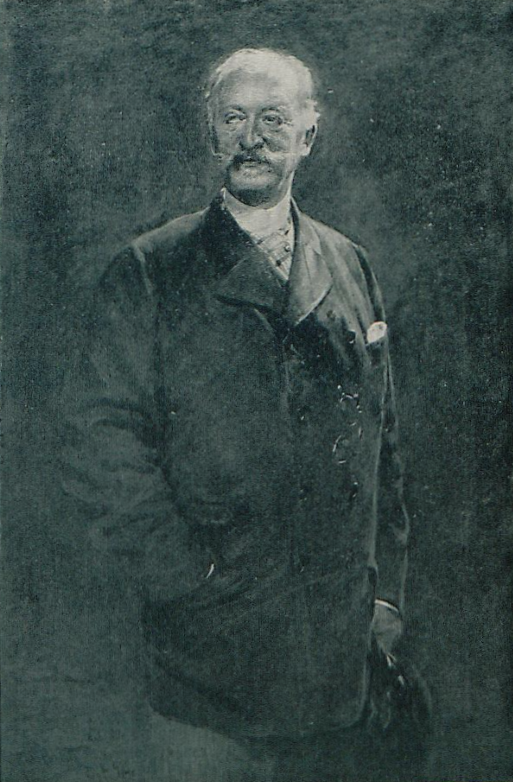
Albert Baur, portrait by Ferdinand Brütt (1894)

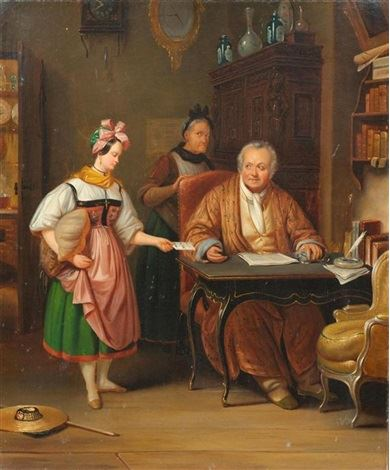
Presenting the Letter

Albert Baur (7 July 1835 – 7 May 1906) was a German painter, illustrator and engraver, associated with the Düsseldorfer Malerschule. He is sometimes referred to as Albert Baur the Elder, to distinguish him from his son, Albert, who was also an artist.

== Biography ==
He was born in Aachen to a family of bankers and was originally sent to Bonn to study medicine. In 1854, against his parents' wishes, he quit medical school and enrolled at the Kunstakademie Düsseldorf, where he studied from 1855 to 1857. His primary instructors there were Christian Köhler and Heinrich Mücke. He also took private lessons from Wilhelm Sohn and Joseph Kehren. In 1860, he moved to Munich and spent two years as a student of Moritz von Schwind. In 1863, he married Marie Beuth (1841–1917) and they had four children.

In 1864, he received a prize for his matte paintings of the Last Judgment at the Landgericht in Elberfeld. This work was commissioned by the jurist, Johann Friedrich Hector Philippi, the father of Baur's friend and school colleague, Heinrich Ludwig Philippi, whose influence prompted him to specialize in history painting. One of his first major works depicted the body of Otto III being carried across the Alps to Germany.

In 1872, he was named a professor at the Grand-Ducal Saxon Art School, Weimar, but his attendance was apparently rather sporadic as he took numerous study trips throughout Europe. He returned to Düsseldorf in 1876 and lived there for the rest of his life.

Among the best known works from this later period are a series of "Nischenbilder" (niche paintings) for the Neues Rathaus (Town Hall), depicting the Love of Art, Industriousness, Desire for Knowledge (Wissensdrang) and Patriotism. Later, he added a mural showing Düsseldorf being taken over by Brandenburg in 1609, following a royal succession dispute.
