= Friedrich Heimerdinger =

German painter

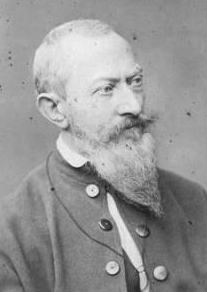
Friedrich Heimerdinger (1874)

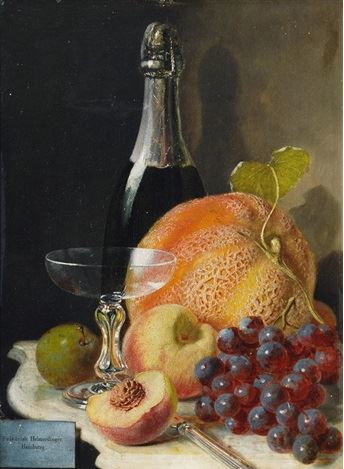
Still life with melon and peaches and champagne bottle

Johann Friedrich Andreas Heimerdinger (10 January 1817, Hamburg - 3 October 1882, Hamburg) was a German painter; specializing in still-lifes.

== Biography ==
After qualifying to enter a university, he completed a degree in education. Then, at the age of twenty-two, he left Hamburg to attend the Kunstakademie. He stayed there until 1841. Theodor Hildebrandt was his primary instructor. On Hildebrandt's recommendation, he was able to attend the Academy of Fine Arts, Munich, from 1842 to 1845. Following graduation, he made an extensive study trip throughout Switzerland, then returned to Hamburg.

There, he worked as a freelance artist and founded a "Schule für angehende Maler und Bildhauer" (School for aspiring painters and sculptors), where he taught "modern art". It proved to be a great success. His best known students include the animal painters, Ludwig Beckmann and Friedrich Rückart, the marine painter, Franz Johann Wilhelm Hünten, and the genre painters, Heinrich Ehrich and Ferdinand Brütt.

He was a member of the Hamburger Künstlerverein von 1832, a progressive artists' association. His largest exhibit was in 1869, at the Glaspalast in Munich. He held numerous smaller exhibitions at the Academy of Fine Arts, Vienna. He was primarily known for still lifes and "Trompe-l'œil" images.

He also wrote several small textbooks, notably: Elements of drawing based on physical objects for teachers and for self-teaching as well as for technical educational institutions (1857), and Preliminary exercises on the elements of drawing based on physical objects for children aged 7-10 years (1868)

== Sources ==
- Ernst Rump: Lexikon der bildenden Künstler Hamburgs, Altonas und der näheren Umgebung. Könnecke, Hamburg 1980 (reprint of the 1912 edition), ISBN 3-7672-0677-3
- "Friedrich Heimerdinger", in: Meyers Konversations-Lexikon, 4th ed. 1888–1890, vol.9, pg.85 f.
