= Ferdinand Brütt =

German painter

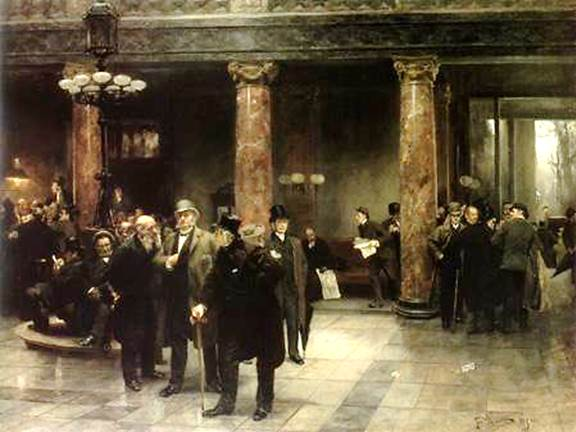
At the Bourse (1888)

Ferdinand Martin Cordt Brütt (13 July 1849 – 6 November 1936) was a German painter. He was a distant relative of the sculptor Adolf Brütt.

== Life and work ==
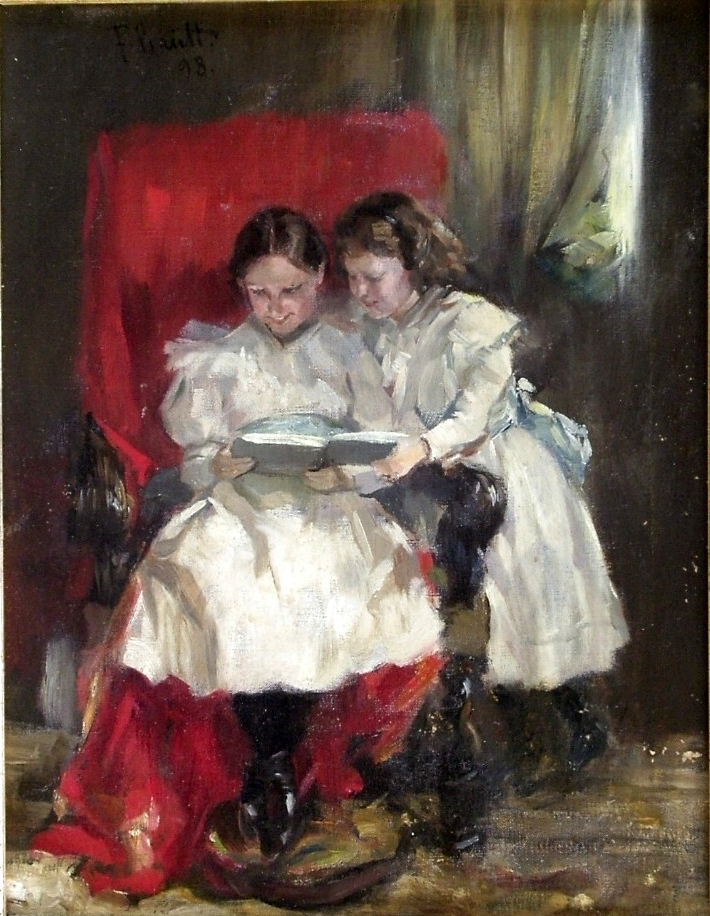
The Artistt's Daughters, Reading (1898)

He was born in Hamburg and took his first art lessons at the Hamburg School of Applied Arts, where he studied with Günther Gensler and Friedrich Heimerdinger. On their recommendation, he transferred to the Weimar Saxon-Grand Ducal Art School in 1870, where his teachers were Albert Baur, Karl Gussow and the history painter Ferdinand Pauwels. Baur would be particularly influential in forming Brütt's mature style.

When Baur accepted a professorship at the Kunstakademie Düsseldorf, Brütt went with him and became a specialist in painting courtroom scenes. He was able to draw from his own experiences, having spent quite a bit of time on jury duty, developing the genre based on earlier work by Louis Gallait and Hendrik Leys.

In 1889, he took an extended study trip to Italy where he found himself less inspired by the "Old Masters" than he was by the landscapes. This prompted further trips to the Alps and the North Sea. In 1893, he was appointed a Royal Prussian Professor.

In 1898, his friend Anton Burger invited him to stay at the Kronberger Artists' Colony in Kronberg im Taunus. He lived and worked there until 1920. He executed several municipal commissions in Frankfurt from 1905 to 1913, including several large wall and ceiling decorations for various public buildings and designs for the Bürgersaale (Civic Hall) in the Rathaus. In 1920, he went to live with his son, a District Court Councillor, in Bergen, where he died in 1936.

His style may generally be described as impressionistic, although he preferred scenes with large crowds in urban or indoor settings. His initial phase extended through the 1880s, when he developed an interest in more subtle displays of light and color. After 1902, he concentrated on large landscapes.

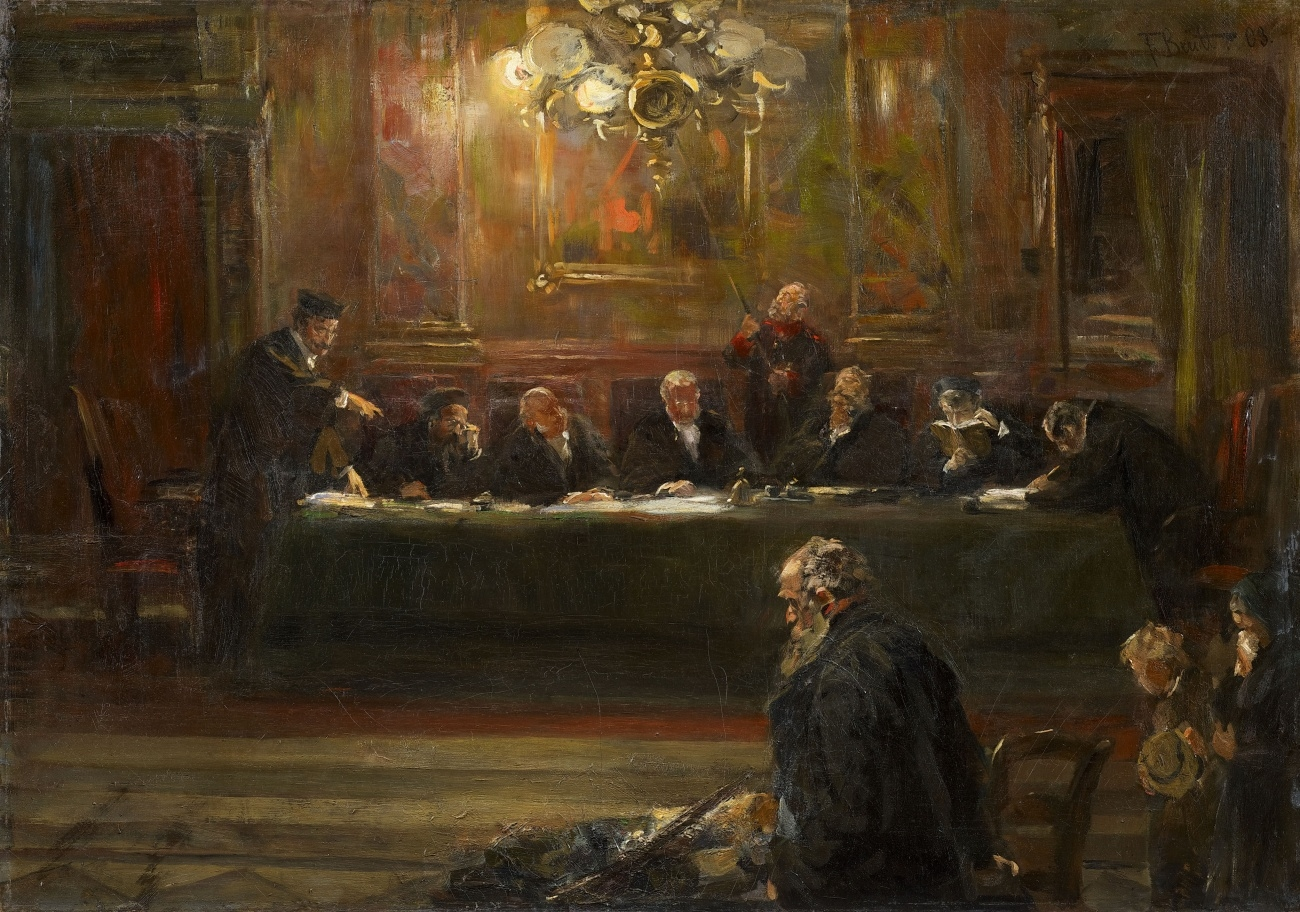
Before the Judges (1903)
