= Willy Spatz =

German painter and lithographer

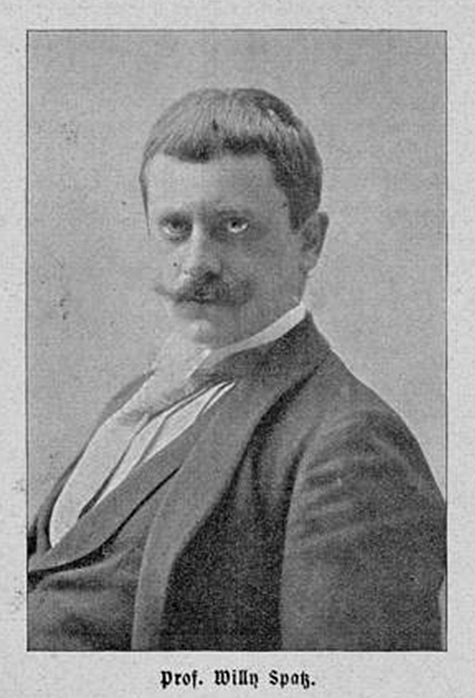
Willy Spatz. Illustration of the title page of "Rhein und Düssel", the illustrated Sunday supplement to the Düsseldorfer Neuesten Nachrichten, No. 4 from 27 January 1907

Willy Spatz (7 September 1861 – 4 August 1931) was a German painter and lithographer.

== Life and work ==
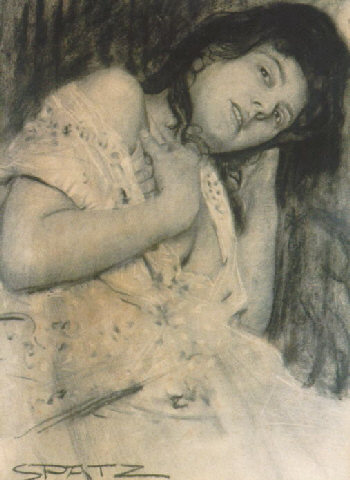
Willy Spatz: Porträt einer jungen Frau. Charcoal on cardboard. Year of origin not known

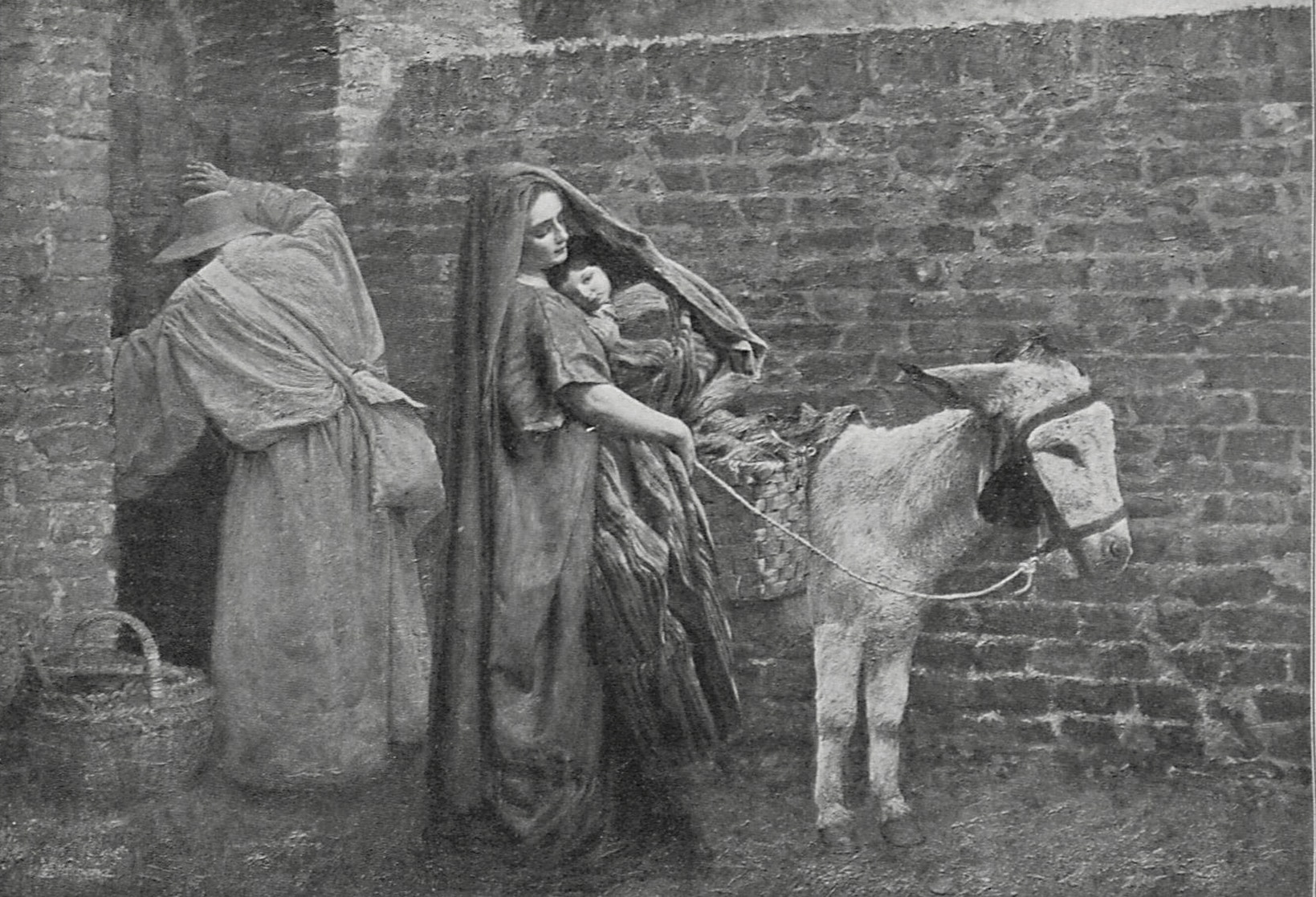
Flucht der Heiligen Familie, exposed in Ausstellungspalast Düsseldorf, 1902

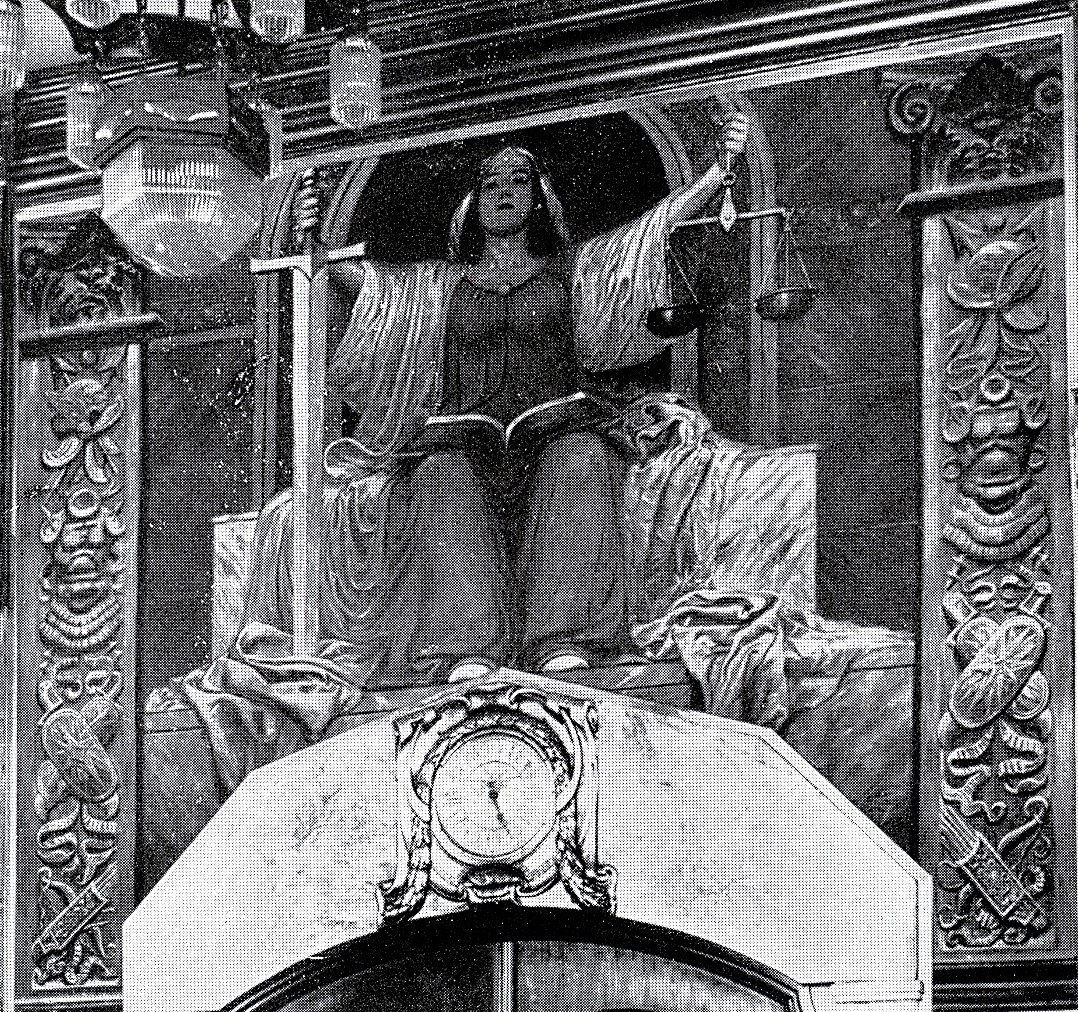
Die Gerechtigkeit, Symbolist Mural of a seing Lady Justice im Oberlandesgericht Düsseldorf, 1913

Born in Düsseldorf, Spatz, called Willy, was the fifth child of eight children of Gustav Wilhelm Gerhard Spatz, merchant and lottery collector in Düsseldorf and Johanna Wilhelmina, née Erbach.

In 1879, Spatz completed his school education at the Humboldt-Gymnasium Düsseldorf in Klosterstraße Düsseldorf. Until 1891, living in the house of his mother Sternstraße 71, he then attended the Kunstakademie Düsseldorf. There he was a pupil of Hugo Crola (preparatory class), Heinrich Lauenstein (elementary class), Adolf Schill (decoration and ornamentation class) and Johann Peter Theodor Janssen, whose master pupil he became. He learned printmaking techniques from Carl Ernst Forberg. He developed his talent as a lithographer as a member of the "St. Lukas Club", founded by Olof Jernberg, Heinrich Hermanns, Helmuth Liesegang, August Deusser, Otto Heichert, Gustav Wendling and Arthur Kampf, who had married his youngest sister Mathilde Spatz (1869–1950) in 1889.

Spatz then went to Munich for a year to Carl von Marr at the Munich Academy of Fine Arts. Both in colouristic and in terms of the way of depicting religious motifs in a contemporary and genre-like manner, which was peculiar to Munich art, this period was of great importance for his artistic development. He undertook a study trip to Paris.

In 1897, Spatz received an appointment at the Düsseldorf Academy, first as professor of the elementary class. Until 1926, he was ordentlicher Professor Head of the Painting Department, alongside which he ran a ladies' painting school in the studio building Wunderbau in Pempelfort until 1915. Spatz is considered one of the late representatives of the Düsseldorf school of painting. Even his early paintings are characterised by a mixture of traditional pathos of history painting, genre-like tendencies and modern striving for abstraction. His work shows the effective light treatment of Parisian salon painting, atmospheric design devices of Art Nouveau and a stark, partly caricaturistic realism of the Old Masters.

He is particularly known for his large-scale historicising mural and oil Painting. In particular, a mural cycle in the chapel of Burg Castle on the Wupper (created from 1899 to 1901) gave him the breakthrough for a whole series of further such creations. In the chapel, he depicted The Power of Christianity over the Human Spirit. The first picture shows St. Suitbertus, preaching, the "Apostle of the Bergisches Land". The second picture is a triptych and illustrates the biblical word I will draw them all to myself. The third painting shows The Little Rose Garden of the Heavenly Paradise. Other works of this kind include five murals, a seeing Justitia and four historical scenes from German court life in the large plenary hall of the Oberlandesgericht Düsseldorf from 1913. In 1902, Spatz received the Order of the Red Eagle IV. Class, awarded by Wilhelm II.

Most of Spatz's large works were destroyed during the Second World War. However, the cycle in the Düsseldorf Higher Regional Court has survived, together with his explanations. In it, Spatz depicted scenes "from the development of German legal life". The painting Gang der Hirten zur Heiligen Familie from 1892, damaged during the war, has now been extensively restored and is in the Museum Kunstpalast.

According to Friedrich Schaarschmidt, curator of the Düsseldorf Art Academy, Spatz marked the beginning of an independent line, a "phantastic direction" in painting, which Schaarschmidt described as "a kind of Düsseldorf Neuromanticism". Schaarschmidt recognised a difference from the religious painting of the late Nazarenes and Eduard von Gebhardt, particularly in the "unrealistic" use of colour, which he attributed to the artistic intention of evoking psychological effects and moods. Spatz, however, strove for an exact historical representation with regard to his figures. Therefore, he conducted extensive research into sources before producing his paintings. For him, historical accuracy took precedence over artistic freedom. For many of his works, it could be proven that the persons depicted showed strong similarities to Düsseldorf personalities.

Spatz was a member of the Düsseldorf artists' association Malkasten, around 1900 on the board and (at least for the first issue of 1900) also artistic advisor to the journal Die Rheinlande. During the First World War, he kept a historically important diary in 21 volumes of about 10,000 pages.

After his death in 1931 at the age of 59, a memorial exhibition was held in his and Wilhelm Degode's honour at the Alte Kunsthalle in early 1932.

== Students ==
- Ellen Auler, private student
- Henriette Paula Häberlin
- Paul Häberlin
- Richard Bloos
- Lorenz Bösken
- Wilhelm Brandenberg (alias Wilhelm Ludger)
- Max Burchartz
- Wilhelm Christens
- Walter Corde
- Edgar Ehses
- Robert Erbelding
- Arthur Erdle
- Willy Hanft
- Ada Haseloff-Preyer, private student
- Edmund Anton Kohlschein
- Will Küpper
- Anna Martens, private student
- Heinz May
- Elisabeth Meyhöfer, private student
- Gabriele Münter, private student
- Heinrich Nauen
- Walter Ophey
- Wolfgang Pagenstecher
- Josef Pallenberg
- Josefa Pernstich
- Oswald Petersen
- Wilhelm Pippert
- Heinrich Repke
- Emma Ritter, private student
- Georg Sluyterman von Langeweyde
- Paula Sedana Schiff-Magnussen, private student
- Wilhelm Schmetz
- Hans Schröers
- Albert Spethmann
- Wilhelm Techmeier
- Gustava von Veith, private student
- Carl Weisgerber
- Paul Wellershaus
