= Wilhelm Schneider-Didam =

German portrait painter (1869-1923)

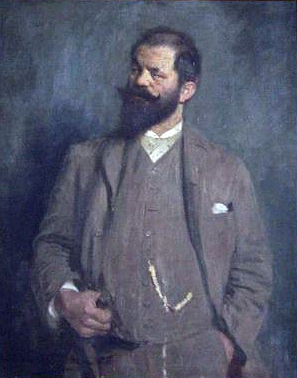
Portrait of the sculptor, Clemens Buscher (1897)

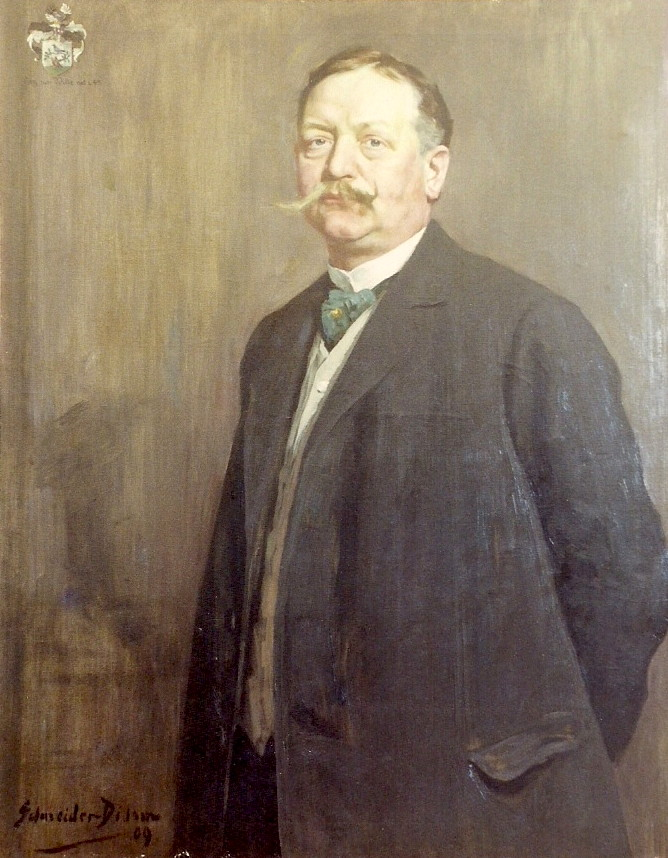
Portrait of the painter, Fritz von Wille (1909)

Wilhelm Schneider-Didam (14 May 1869 – 5 April 1923) was a German portrait painter of the Düsseldorf school of painting.

== Life ==
Born in Altenhundem, Province of Westphalia, Schneider-Didam first attended the painting and drawing school of the Kölnisches Stadtmuseum in 1886/1887. From 1887 to 1893, he then studied at the Kunstakademie Düsseldorf. There, Hugo Crola, Johann Peter Theodor Janssen and especially the portrait painter Julius Roeting were his teachers.

In 1894, he made his debut in his first exhibition, which was held in the Galerie Eduard Schulte in Düsseldorf. Through portraits of fellow artists, Schneider-Didam soon gained a reputation as a painter of excellent portraits of gentlemen. Until his death he lived in Düsseldorf, where he was a member of the artists' association Laetitia and the Malkasten.

Together with Eugen Kampf, he ran a private painting school for women, the Damenakademien München und Berlin und Malerinnenschule Karlsruhe, which was initially located at Jacobistraße 14a, and later, in the early 20th century, in the so-called Hungerturm, also known as the Eiskellerberg, opposite the Academy of Arts. Sibylle Ascheberg von Bamberg, Gertrud Friedersdorf (b. 1882), Alice Jacobs (b. 1879) and Paula Baruch, later wife of Paul Häberlin, were among his pupils.

Schneider-Didam died in Düsseldorf at the age of 53.

== Work ==
- Clemens Buscher, portrait, 1897, Buscher-Museum, Gamburg
- Der Kunstkritiker, 1901
- Fritz von Wille, Portrait, 1909, Fritz-von-Wille-Museum, Bitburg

== Exhibitions (selection) ==
- “Mal doch!“ Andreas Dirks (1865–1922), Sylt Museum, Keitum / Sylt, Andreas Dirks with Eugen Dücker, Theodor von Hagen, Leopold Graf von Kalckreuth, Wilhelm Schneider-Didam, Alexander Essfeld and Ingo Kühl, 2022.
