= Olof Jernberg =

German landscape and marine painter (1855–1935)

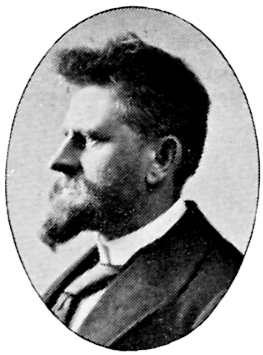
Olof Jernberg; from the Svenskt Porträttgalleri XX (1901)

Olof August Andreas Jernberg (23 May 1855 – 15 February 1935) was a German landscape and marine painter of Swedish ancestry; associated with the Düsseldorfer Malerschule.

== Life and work ==
He was born in Düsseldorf. His father was the Swedish genre painter, August Jernberg. After completing his secondary education, he studied at the Kunstakademie Düsseldorf from 1875 to 1876. His primary instructors were Andreas Müller and Heinrich Lauenstein. Later, he worked with Karl Müller, and became a private student of Eugen Dücker, with whom he studied landscape painting until 1879.

From 1880 to 1881, he was in France, where he occasionally sought advice from the Swedish painter, Hugo Salmson. He also came under the influence of the Barbizon school, especially the works of Jean-François Millet and Théodore Rousseau, and developed a preference for painting en plein air. This was followed by others travels, notably to Sweden, and he was a frequent guest at the artists' colony in Katwijk.

When he returned to Düsseldorf, he worked as an assistant to Dücker at the Kunstakademie; a position he held until 1898. In 1889, together Heinrich Hermanns, Eugen Kampf and Helmuth Liesegang, he was one of the co-founders of the "Lucas Club"; an organization opposed to the exhibition policy of the Kunstverein für die Rheinlande und Westfalen. One of their goals was to combine the stylistic approaches of the Barbizon and Hague schools with the aesthetics of Impressionism. Two years later, the Lucas Club was subordinated to the new Freie Vereinigung Düsseldorfer Künstler. In 1899, a new "St. Lucas Club" was founded by Liesegang and the other founders of the original Club, with the addition of August Deusser, Otto Heichert and Gustav Wendling. Until 1897, he was also a member of the progressive artists' association "Malkasten" (Paintbox).

In 1898, he was awarded the title of Professor and, in 1901, appointed to the Kunstakademie Königsberg. From 1918 until his death, he taught landscape painting at the Prussian Academy of Arts. In 1922, he was honored with a solo exhibition at the Düsseldorfer Kunstpalast. His best known students include Theo von Brockhusen, Hermann Busse, and Heinz Heinrichs. He died in 1935 in Berlin.

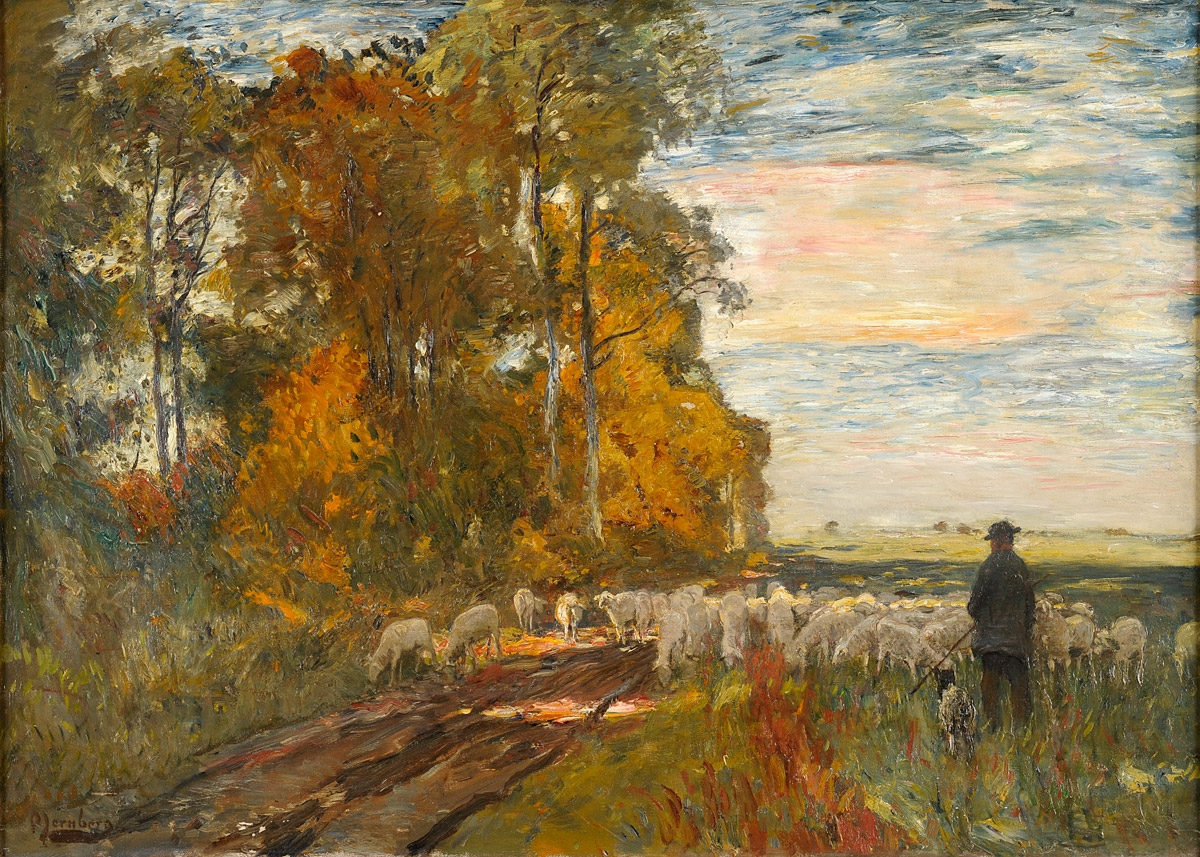
Autumn Landscape with a Shepherd and His Flock
