= Wilhelm Schreuer =

German painter (1866–1933)

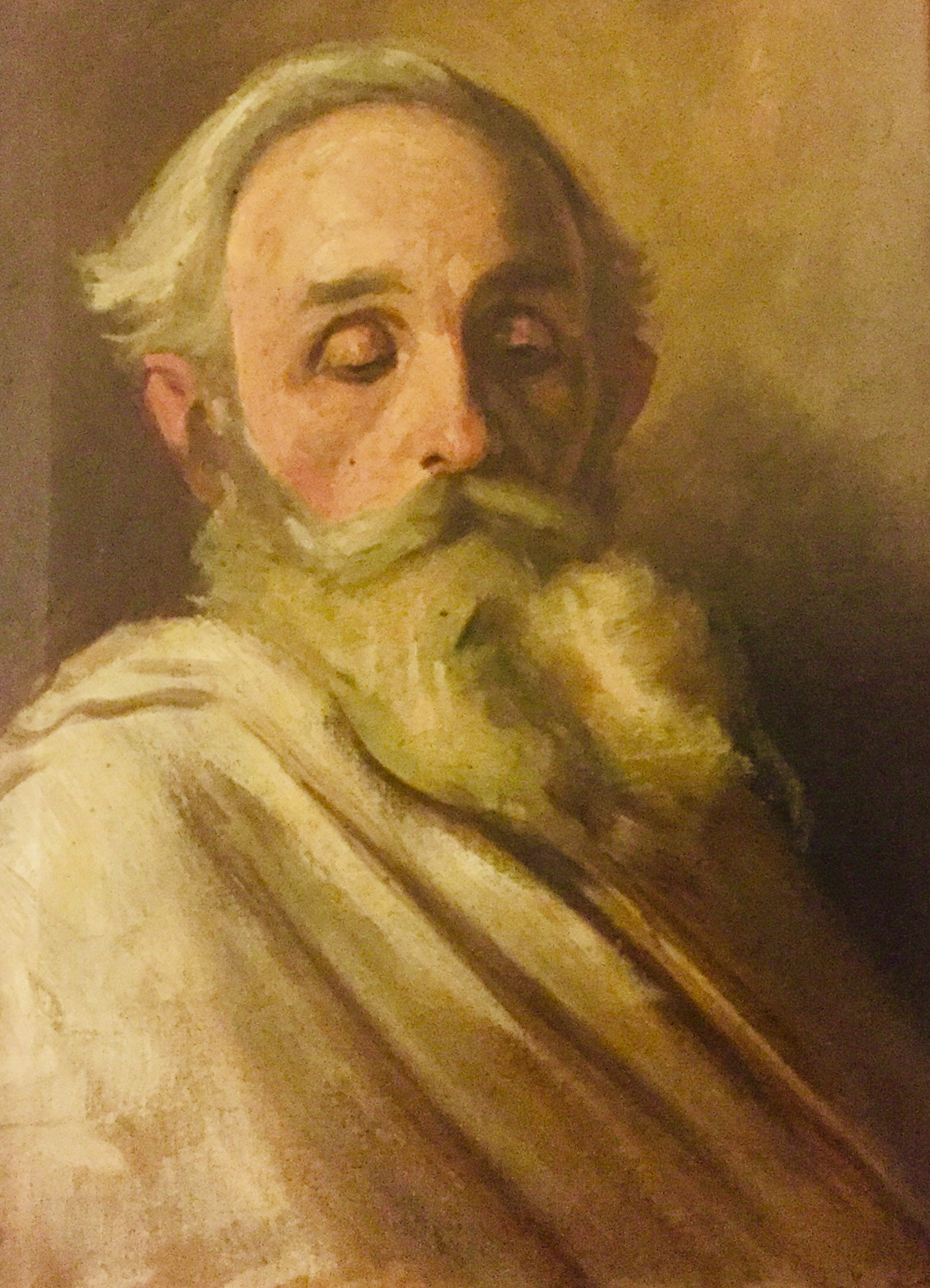
Self-portrait (c.1920)

Wilhelm Schreuer (28 September 1866 – 11 November 1933) was a German painter; associated with the Düsseldorfer Malerschule.

== Biography ==
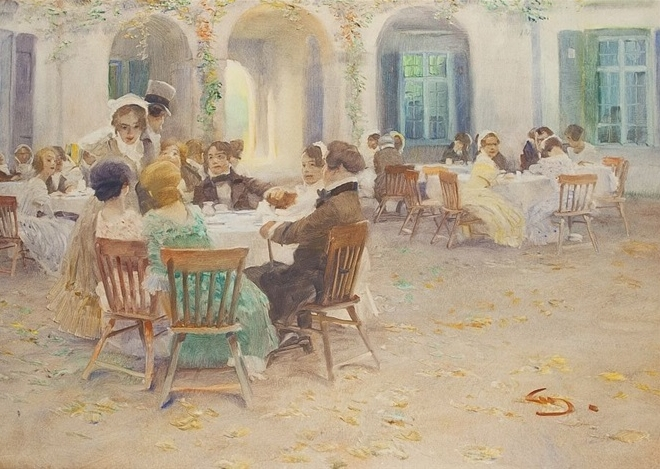
Courtyard Garden Café

He was born in Wesel. His father, Johann Heinrich Schreuer, was a master baker. In 1872, the family moved to Cologne, where his father had bought a bakery. In addition to his professional work, he drew and painted in his spare time. As a result, Wilhelm developed an interest in art, which his family encouraged. In 1884, after completing his secondary education, he was admitted to the Kunstakademie Düsseldorf. His initial instructors were the decorative painter, Heinrich Lauenstein, and Hugo Crola, known for his portraits. From 1886 to 1890, he was a master student in the studios of Johann Peter Theodor Janssen.

From 1896, he was a member of the progressive artists' association, Malkasten. His exhibitions with them were largely successful, and he acquired the patronage of Eduard Schulte, an art dealer who had galleries in Cologne and Berlin. In 1899, he married the painter Maria Pauly (1874–1955), a daughter of the art dealer, Leo Pauly. They had five sons and five daughters.

In 1913, the Hamburger Kunstverein held an exhibition focusing on the art of various German cities, and Schreuer was chosen to represent Düsseldorf. During World War I, he served as a war painter/correspondent on the fronts in France and Belgium.

During the 1920s, he participated in numerous notable exhibitions, in both Düsseldorf and Cologne. Some of his paintings were purchased by the Wallraf-Richartz-Museum. Others may be seen at the Stadtmuseum Landeshauptstadt Düsseldorf. Schreuer died in 1933 in Düsseldorf. In 1934, a major retrospective of his work was held at the Kunstverein für die Rheinlande und Westfalen.

Most of his works were created with a distinctive technique, involving diluted colors on a damp surface, applied to glued paper; a method that makes major corrections almost impossible. The resulting surface is smooth as glass. Often, the effect is nearly monochromatic. Although he painted a wide variety of subjects, scenes from inns, restaurants, dance halls, and various events were obviously his favorites.

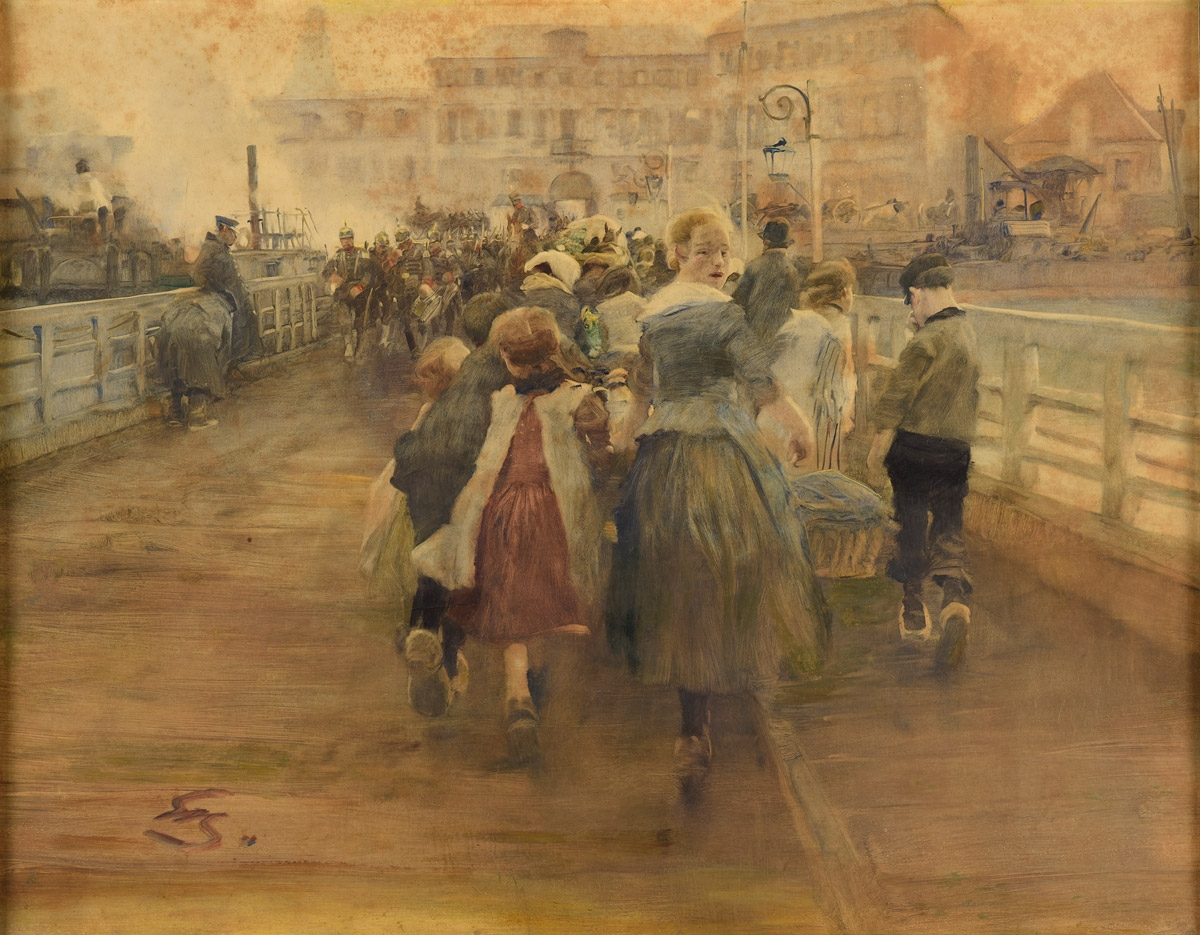
The Old Pontoon Bridge, Düsseldorf
