= August Jernberg =

Swedish artist

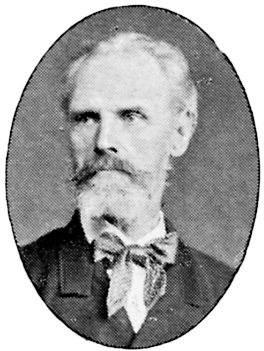
- Born: August Jernberg; 16 September 1826; Gävle, Sweden
- Died: 22 June 1896 (aged 69); Düsseldorf, German Empire
- Known for: Painter
- Movement: Düsseldorf school of painting

August Jernberg (16 September 1826 – 22 June 1896) was a Swedish artist. He was a member of the Düsseldorf school of painting.

== Biography ==
He was mainly a painter of portraits in his early years; he also painted historical and biblical pictures. In the 1860s he became a genre and landscape painter. He studied at the Royal Swedish Academy of Fine Arts in Stockholm from 1843 to 1846 and then traveled to Paris, where he studied from 1847 to 1853 with Thomas Couture (1815–1879).

He exhibited at the Scandinavian Art Exhibition at Stockholm in 1850 and at the Exposition Universelle (1855) at Paris. In 1854, he settled in Düsseldorf and was admitted as a member to the Kunstakademie Düsseldorf. He remained in Düsseldorf until his death, with the exceptions of some shorter trips.

In 1848, he married Margareta Bjurling (1823–1903). They were the parents of several children including their son Olof Jernberg (1855–1935) who was a German landscape and marine painter.

== Gallery ==
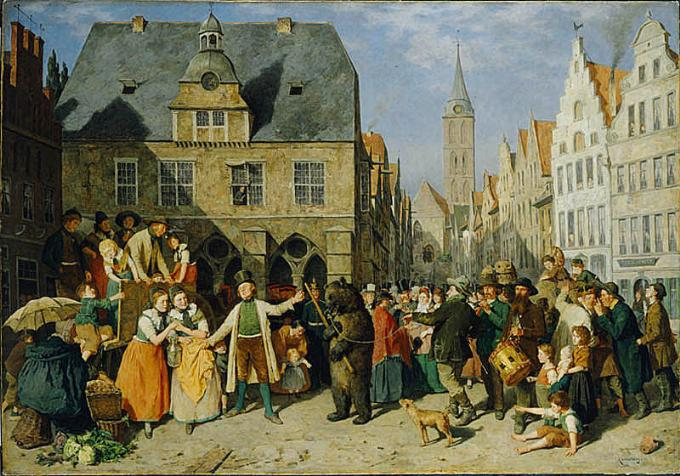
A Dancing Bear (1865)

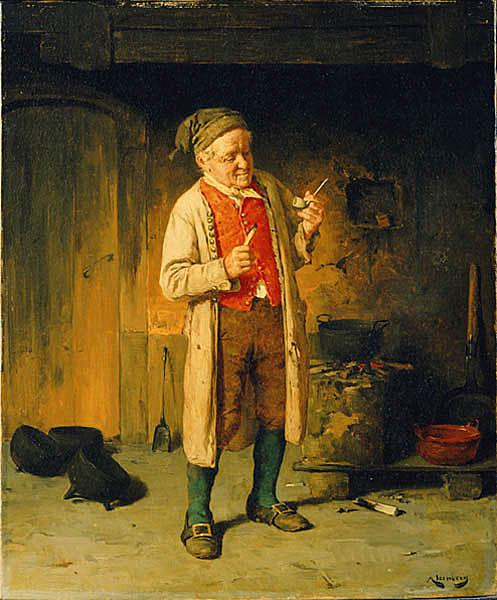
The New Pipe

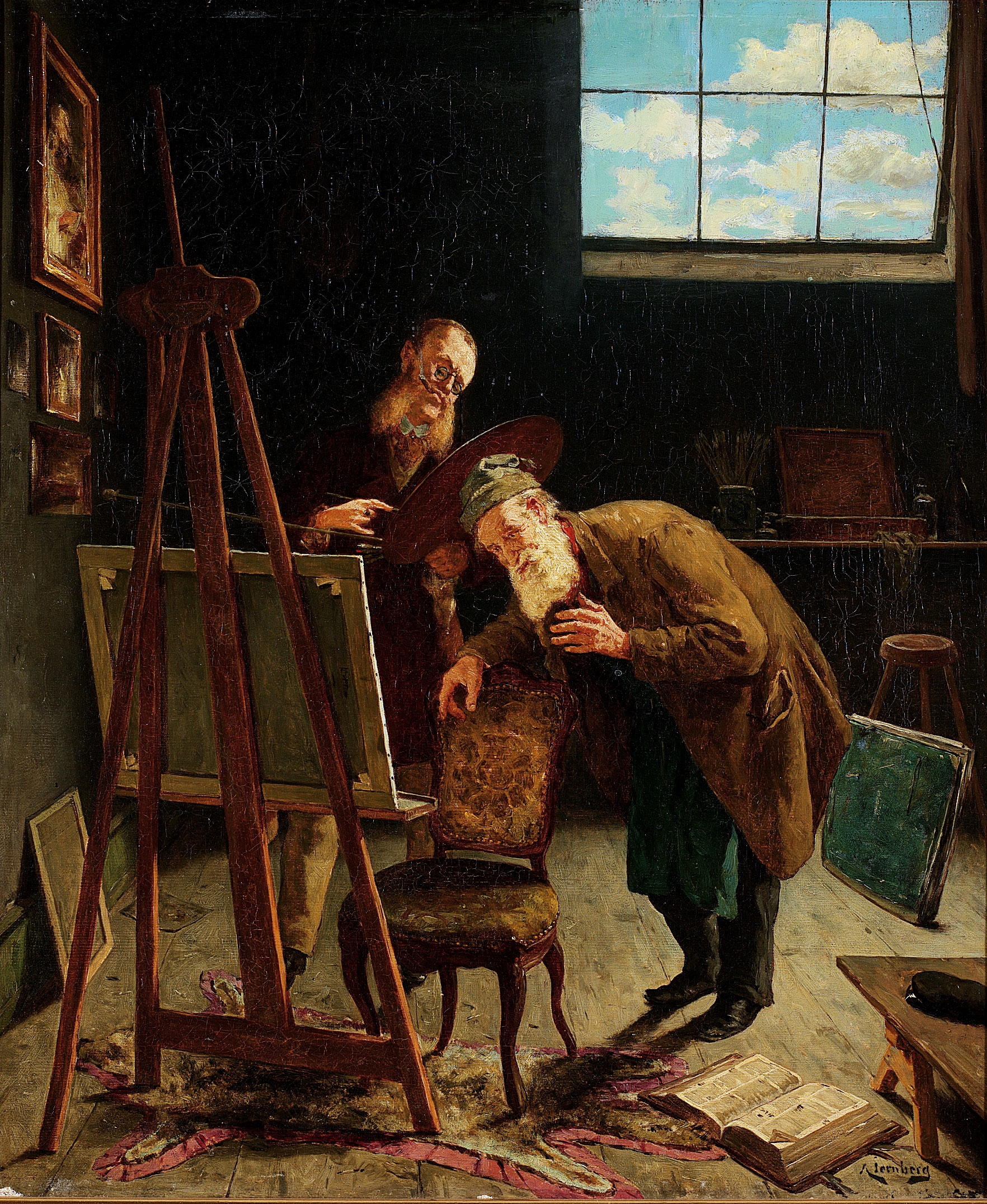
Interior from an artists studio

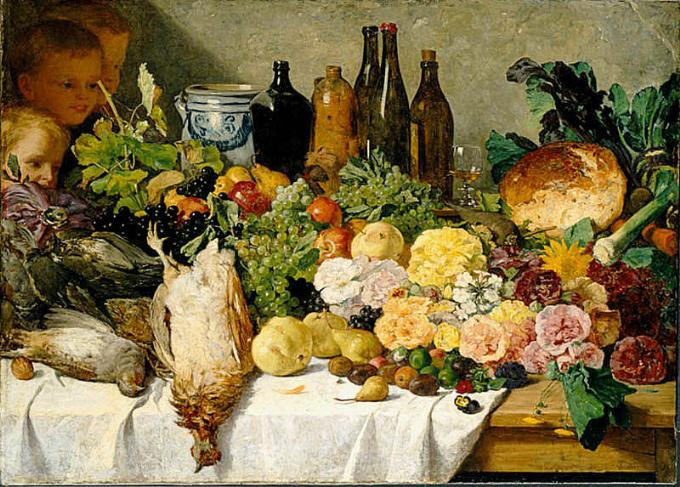
Still life (1863)

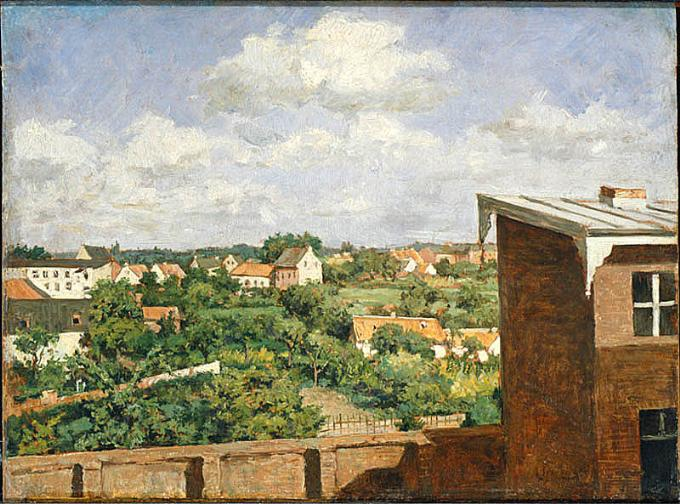
View from Düsseldorf (ca 1865)
