= Eugen Kampf =

German painter (1861–1933)

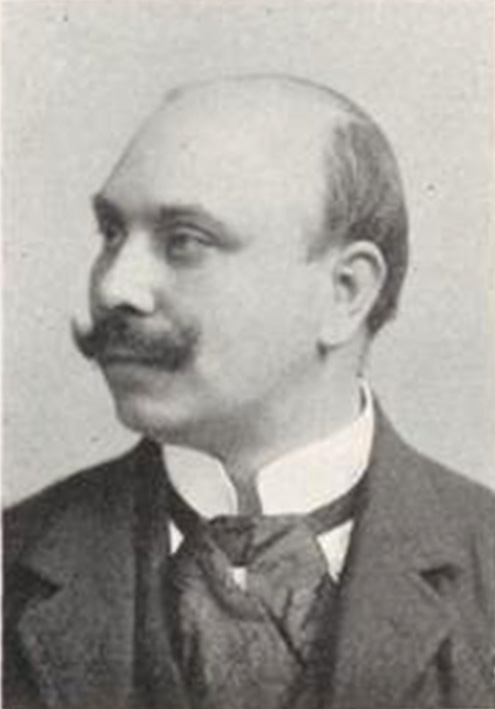
Eugen Kampf (1904)

Eugen Kampf (16 March 1861 – 13 April 1933) was a German painter; associated with the Düsseldorf school of painting. He specialized in rural and village scenes.

== Biography ==
He was born in Aachen. His father, August Kampf, was a painter and photographer. He and his younger brother, Arthur Kampf, shared an early interest in painting. From 1878 to 1880, Eugen took his first lessons at the Artesis Hogeschool Antwerpen in Flanders, then at the Kunstakademie Düsseldorf, where he studied with Eugen Dücker until 1883. He completed his studies in 1884 at the Académie royale des Beaux-Arts de Bruxelles.

He returned to Düsseldorf in 1889. There, in response to the conservative policies of the Kunstverein für die Rheinlande und Westfalen, he joined with Olof Jernberg, Heinrich Hermanns and Helmuth Liesegang to form the "Lucas-Club"; an association of forward-looking landscape painters. By 1891, the club had become subordinated to the Freie Vereinigung Düsseldorfer Künstler, and remained so until 1899, when a new "St. Lukas-Club" broke away.

Kampf was also an active member of several other artists' associations. Together with Wilhelm Schneider-Didam, he operated a "Damenakademie" (school for women) and conducted classes in a building across the street from the Kunstakademie. In 1908, he became a Professor at the Kunstakademie.

From 1880 on, he hosted exhibitions at the Glaspalast in Munich, as well as in Dresden and Leipzig, and received a gold medal at the Große Berliner Kunstausstellung of 1906. He also exhibited at the Exposition Universelle (1900) and the "Exposición de arte alemán" in Buenos Aires (1913).

His works may be seen at the Suermondt-Ludwig-Museum in Aachen and the Museum Kunstpalast, among others. His son, Ari Walter Kampf (1894-1955), also became a painter.

Kampf died in Düsseldorf at the age of 72.

== Selected paintings ==
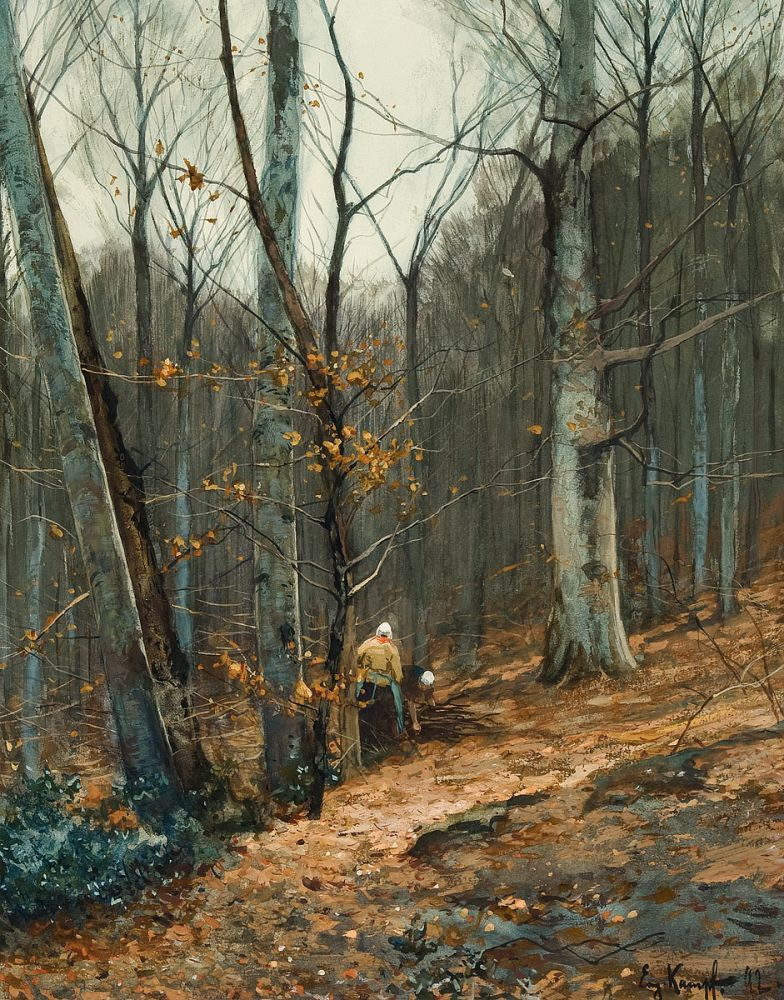
The Brushwood Gatherers

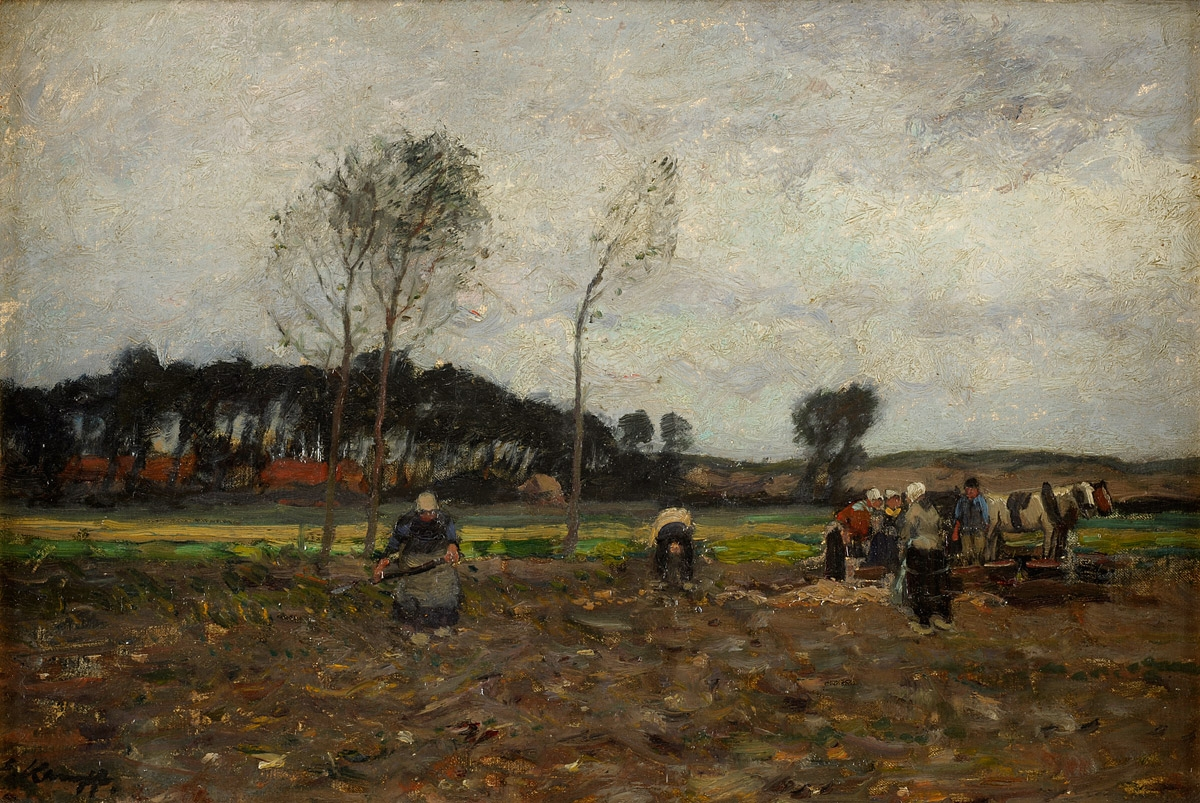
Potato Harvest

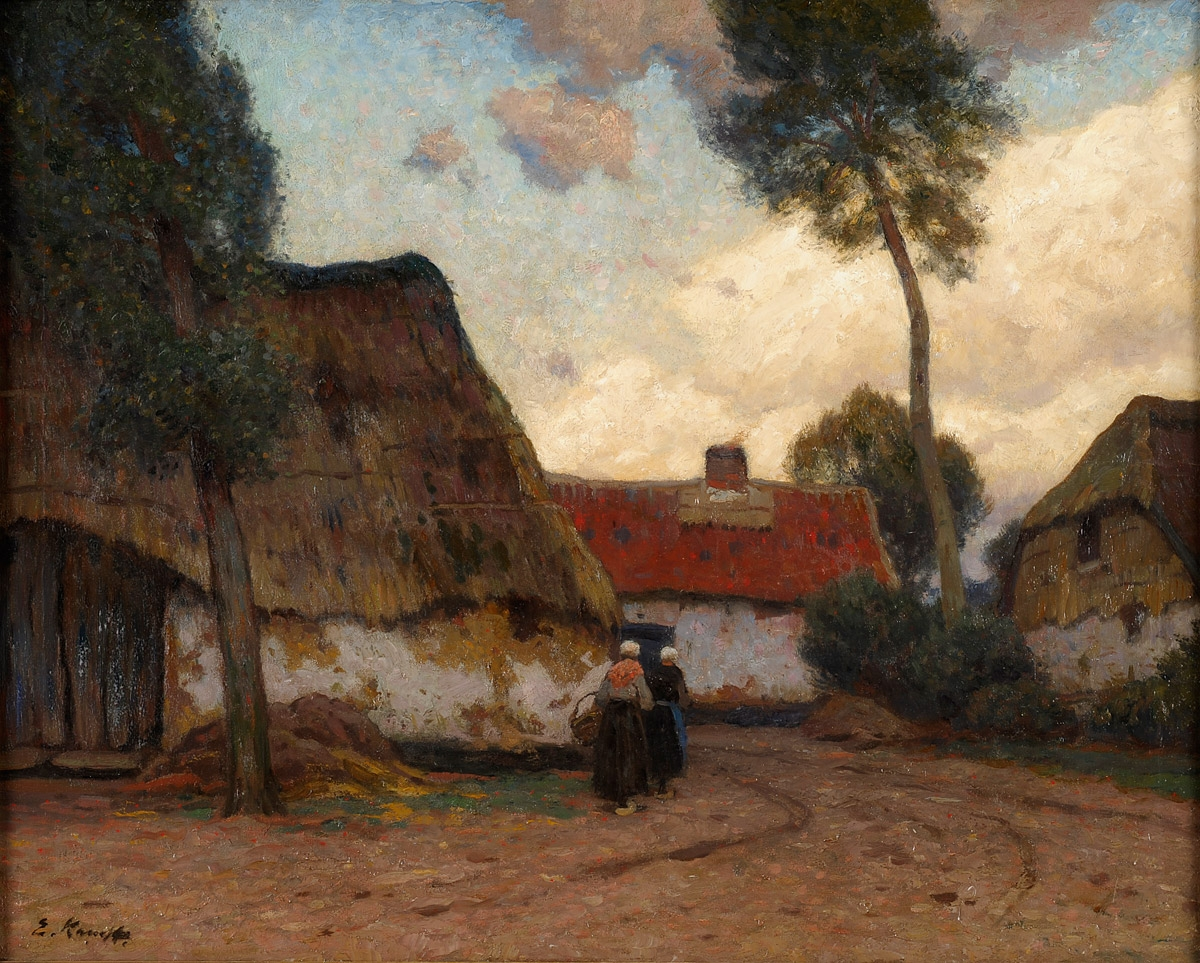
Village Street in Flanders

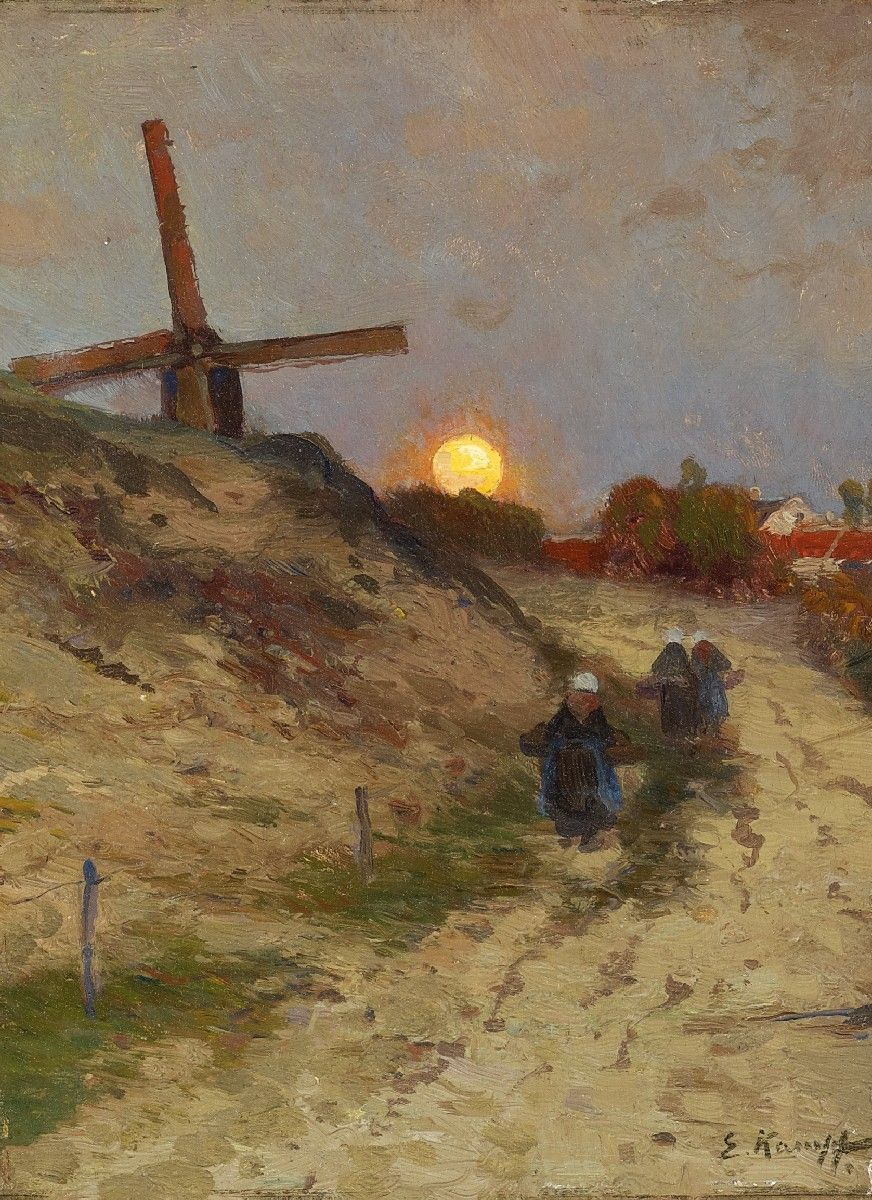
Moonrise Over the Sand Dunes

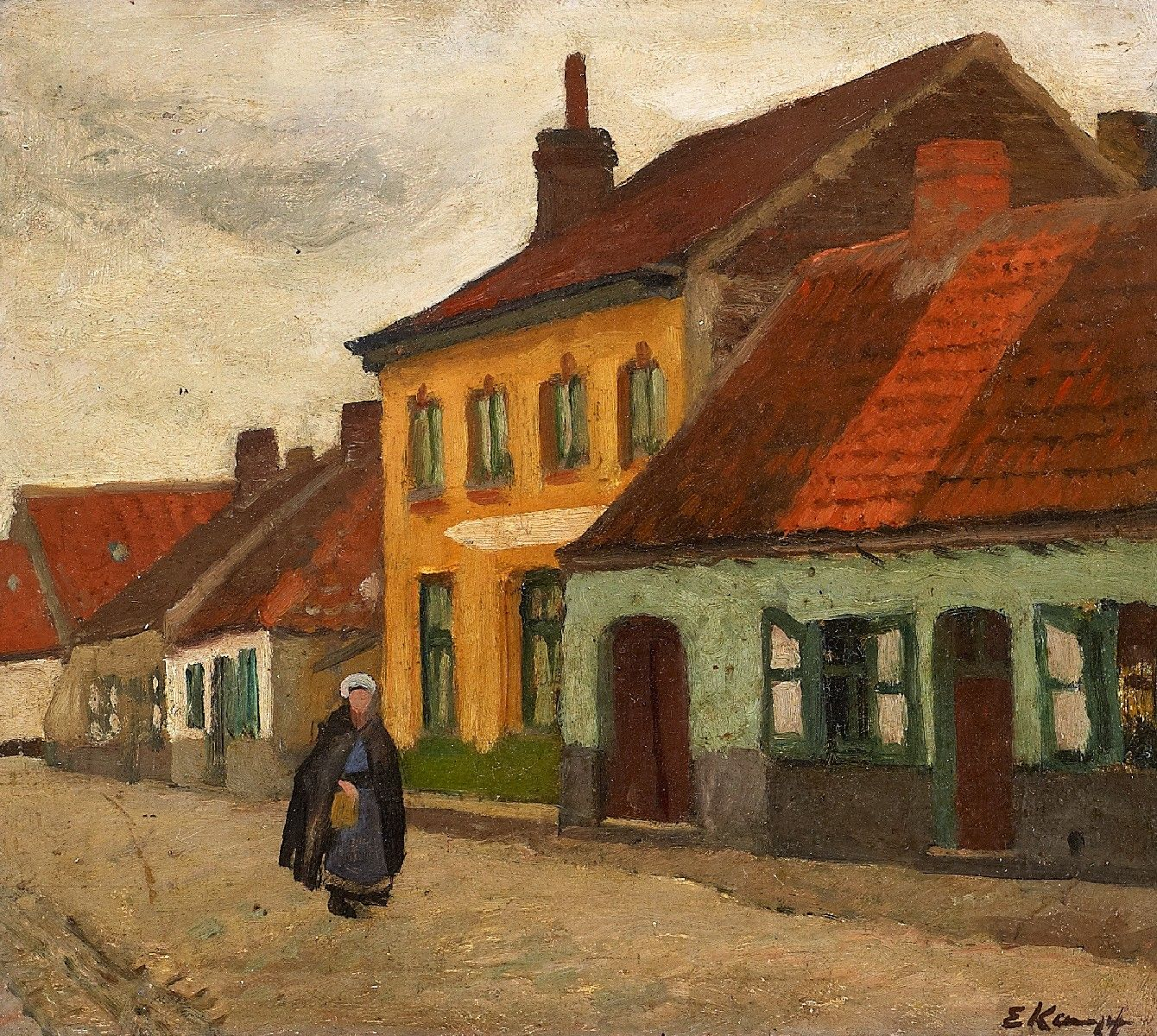
On the Way to Market
