= Helmuth Liesegang =

German painter (1858–1945)

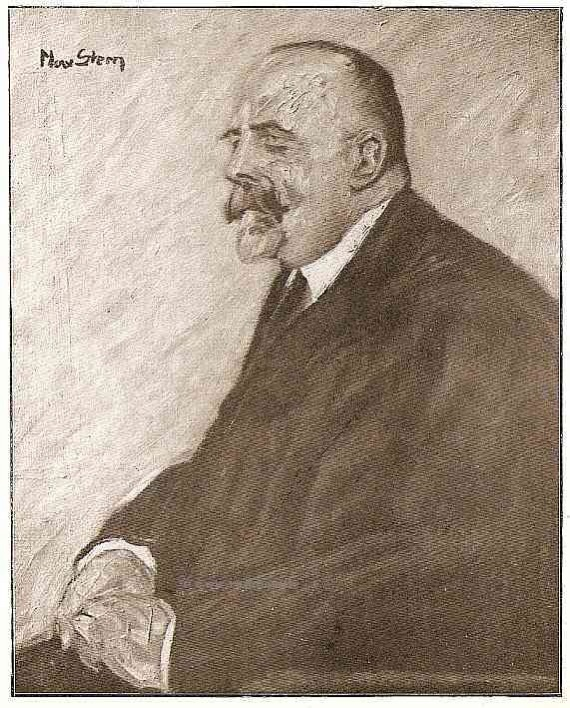
Helmuth Liesegang, by Max Stern (c.1910)

Helmuth Heinrich Liesegang (18 July 1858, Duisburg – 31 July 1945, Leipzig) was a German landscape painter; associated with the Düsseldorfer Malerschule.

== Life and work ==
He was the son of a gymnasium teacher, Helmuth Karl Albert Liesegang, and his wife, Agnes née Jüngel. In 1868, his family moved to Kleve, where his father was head of the Königliche Gymnasium for twenty-eight years. As a teenager, he loved to roam through the surrounding woods, sketching. After completing his secondary education, he enrolled at the Kunstakademie Düsseldorf, where he studied from 1877 to 1885. His primary instructor there was Eugen Dücker. He also learned etching from Carl Ernst Forberg.

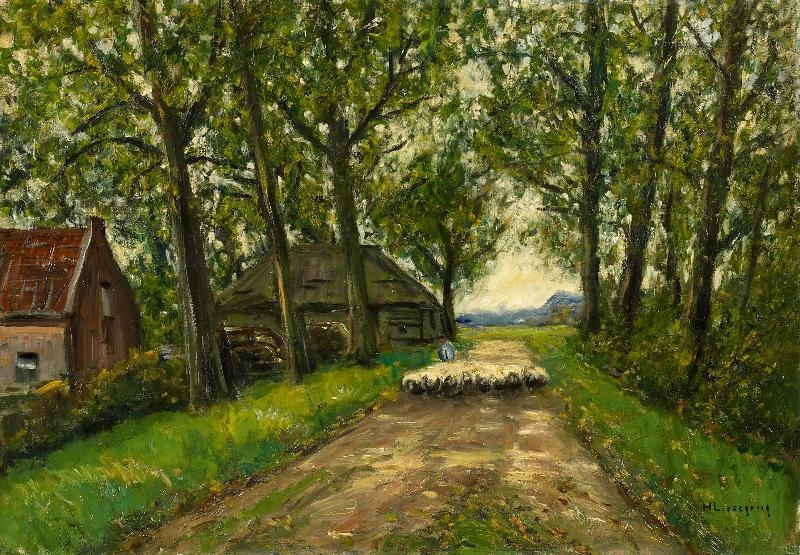
Summer Lane with a Flock of Sheep

In 1885, together with his friend, Arthur Kampf, he visited Paris, where he came under the influence of the Barbizon school; especially Jean-François Millet and Jules Bastien-Lepage. Later, he became interested in the Hague school; travelling throughout Belgium and Holland, sketching landscapes. In 1888, he became an honorary member of the artists' association, Malkasten (Paintbox). The following year, together with Olof Jernberg, Eugen Kampf and Heinrich Hermanns, he founded the "Lucas Club"; as a reaction to the exhibition policies of the Kunstverein für die Rheinlande und Westfalen. The Club sought to combine the stylistic approaches of the Barbizon and Hague schools with the aesthetics of Impressionism.

Two years later, the Lucas Club was subordinated to the new Freie Vereinigung Düsseldorfer Künstler. In 1899, a new "St. Lucas Club" was founded by Liesegang and the other founders of the original Club, with the addition of August Deusser, Otto Heichert and Gustav Wendling. He was also a member of the Deutscher Künstlerbund and the Verein der Düsseldorfer Künstler.

In his later years, he was awarded the title of Professor, and continued to take part in large exhibitions; notably those of "Young Rhineland". In 1929, he published a memoir: Aus meinen Lehr- und Wanderjahren (From my Apprenticeship and Travelling Years). In 1943, he was awarded the Goethe-Medaille für Kunst und Wissenschaft and, the following year, received the Cornelius-Preis.

When Düsseldorf was heavily damaged by bombing raids, he was evacuated to Leipzig, where he died at the age of eighty-seven. He was returned to Düsseldorf for burial at the Nordfriedhof. A street nearby is named after him. In 1989, a piece of a column from the New Town Hall was erected there, as a memorial.

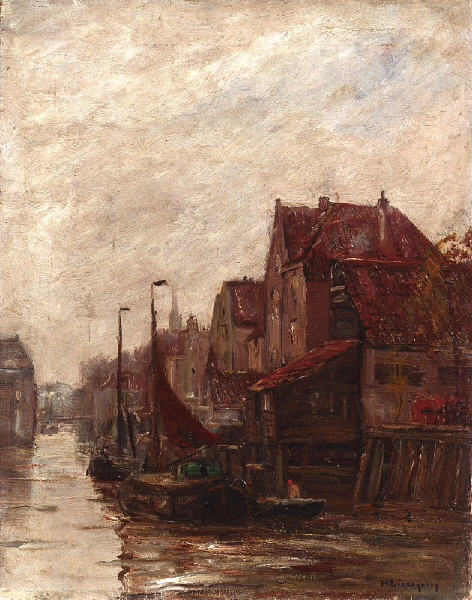
Belgian Port
