= Fritz Neuhaus =

German painter (1852–1922)

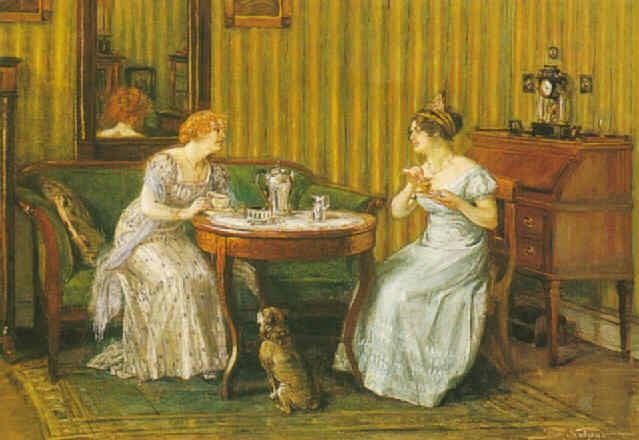
The Tea Party

Karl August Friedrich Neuhaus, known as Fritz (3 April 1852, Elberfeld – 5 September 1922, Düsseldorf) was a German genre and history painter; associated with the Düsseldorfer Malerschule.

== Life and work ==
He grew up in modest circumstances. After serving an apprenticeship with a lithographer in Barmen, he enrolled at the Kunstakademie Düsseldorf in 1873. There he studied with Eduard von Gebhardt and Wilhelm Sohn. During this time, he began sharing a studio with Friedrich Gerhardt. His debut came in 1878, at an exhibition in Berlin. He graduated in 1880 and married Bertha Zilcher.

After 1884, he taught painting and figure drawing at the Kunstgewerbeschule Düsseldorf (School of Arts and Crafts), where he also maintained a studio. By the latter part of the 1880s, he had become successful enough to afford an apartment and studio in an upper-class part of the city. In 1892, he participated in a competition to provide decorative paintings for the new Town Hall. His entry was given third place. It depicted a performance and banquet, honoring Emperor Wilhelm I, that was held in the event hall of the artists' association "Malkasten" (Paintbox) in 1877. Two years after the competition he was able to paint it, in the form of a mural, in one of the Town Hall's meeting rooms. It was destroyed during World War II.

In 1898, he was awarded the title of Professor. By 1912, he was able to move into his own, newly built home on Prinz-Georg-Straße. Around that same time his son, Carl (1881–1929), established his own sculpture studio.

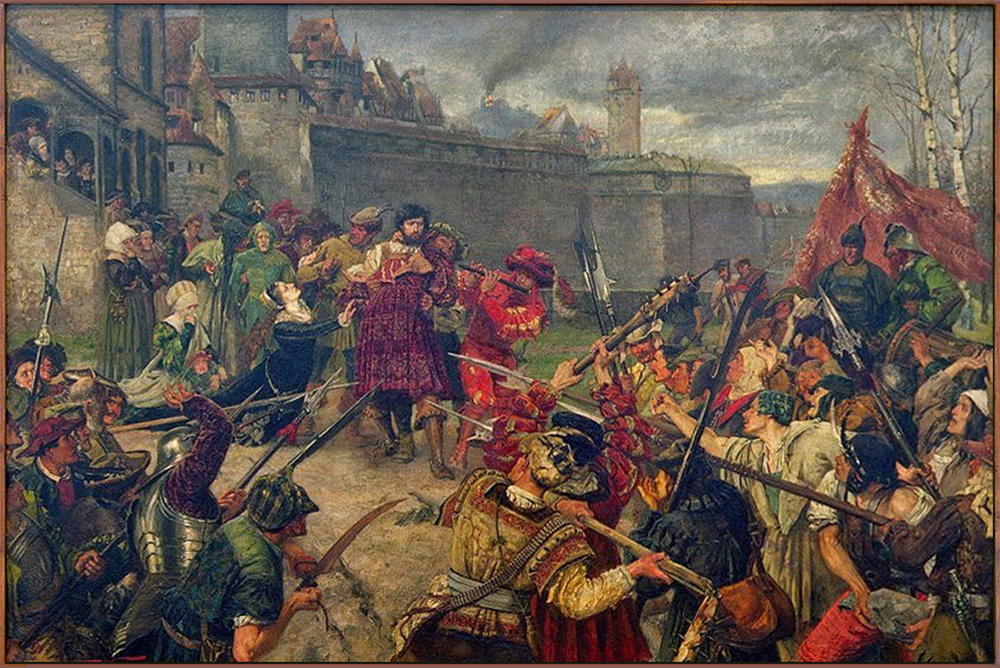
The Murder of Count Helfenstein
