= Josef Pallenberg =

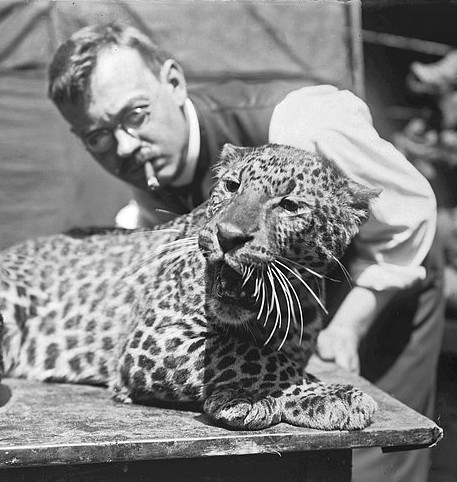
Josef Pallenberg and his leopard

Josef Franz Pallenberg (6 August 1882, Cologne - 26 June 1946, Düsseldorf) was a German sculptor; best known for his animal statues.

== Biography ==
He was the oldest son of Jean Pallenberg, a craftsman, and a nephew of Johann Heinrich Pallenberg, a furniture manufacturer with a Royal Warrant of Appointment to the Prussian Court. At the age of six, a visit to the Cologne Zoo inspired him to begin sketching animals.

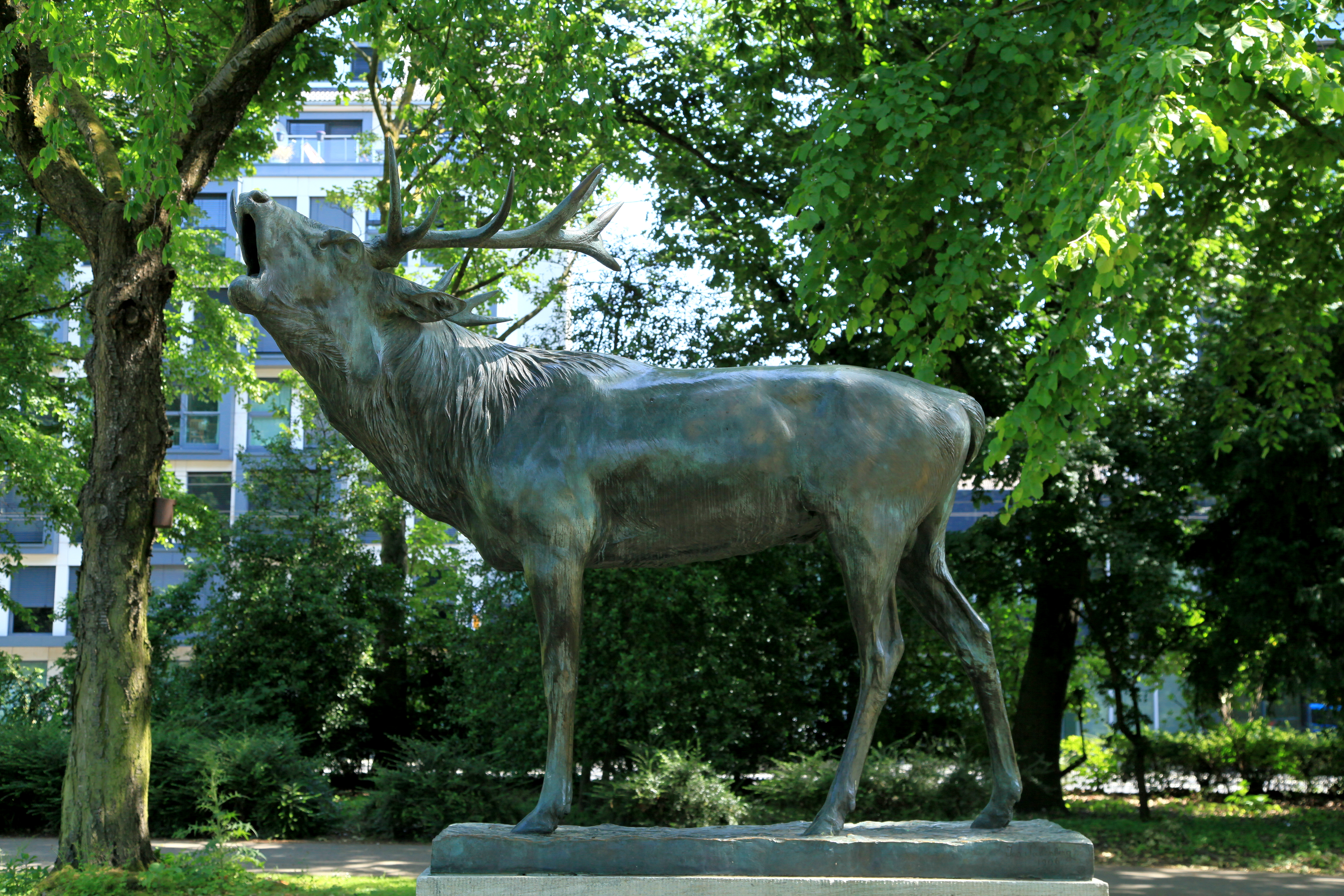
Rutting Stag; Düsseldorf Hofgarten

In 1899, he enrolled at the Kunstakademie Düsseldorf, where he took drawing lessons from Ernst Roeber and Willy Spatz. He soon switched to the sculpture classes taught by Karl Janssen. His first large work, "Sauhatz" (pig hunt) was shown at the Kunstpalast in 1902 as part of the Industrial and Commercial Exhibition. He was, however, denied a medal because it was classified as a "student work". In 1904, he entered sixteen sculptures in the Große Berliner Kunstausstellung. He was awarded a gold medal there in 1907, for his bronze statue, "Fliegende Adler" (Flying Eagle).

After leaving the Kunstakademie, he went to the Berlin Zoo, where the zoologist, Ludwig Heck, became his patron. He produced several large animal sculptures, which caught the attention of Carl Hagenbeck, an animal dealer who is credited with creating the modern zoo. This resulted in a commission to sculpt the bronzes at the entrance gates of the Tierpark Hagenbeck. Pallenberg also sculpted a series of life-sized dinosaur sculptures for the zoo.

At his studio in Cologne, near the zoo, he kept some live animal models; including a lioness named "Juste", and a wolf named "Prinz". He would take them for leashed walks, much to the displeasure of his neighbors. In 1912, he established a private zoo on a larger property, at a new studio in Düsseldorf. His younger brother, Christian, initially helped him care for the animals, until he was drafted. In 1915, Maria Steinhausen, a friend's widow, moved in with her fifteen year old daughter. Together, they took care of the animals and his household. He and Maria were married in 1917.

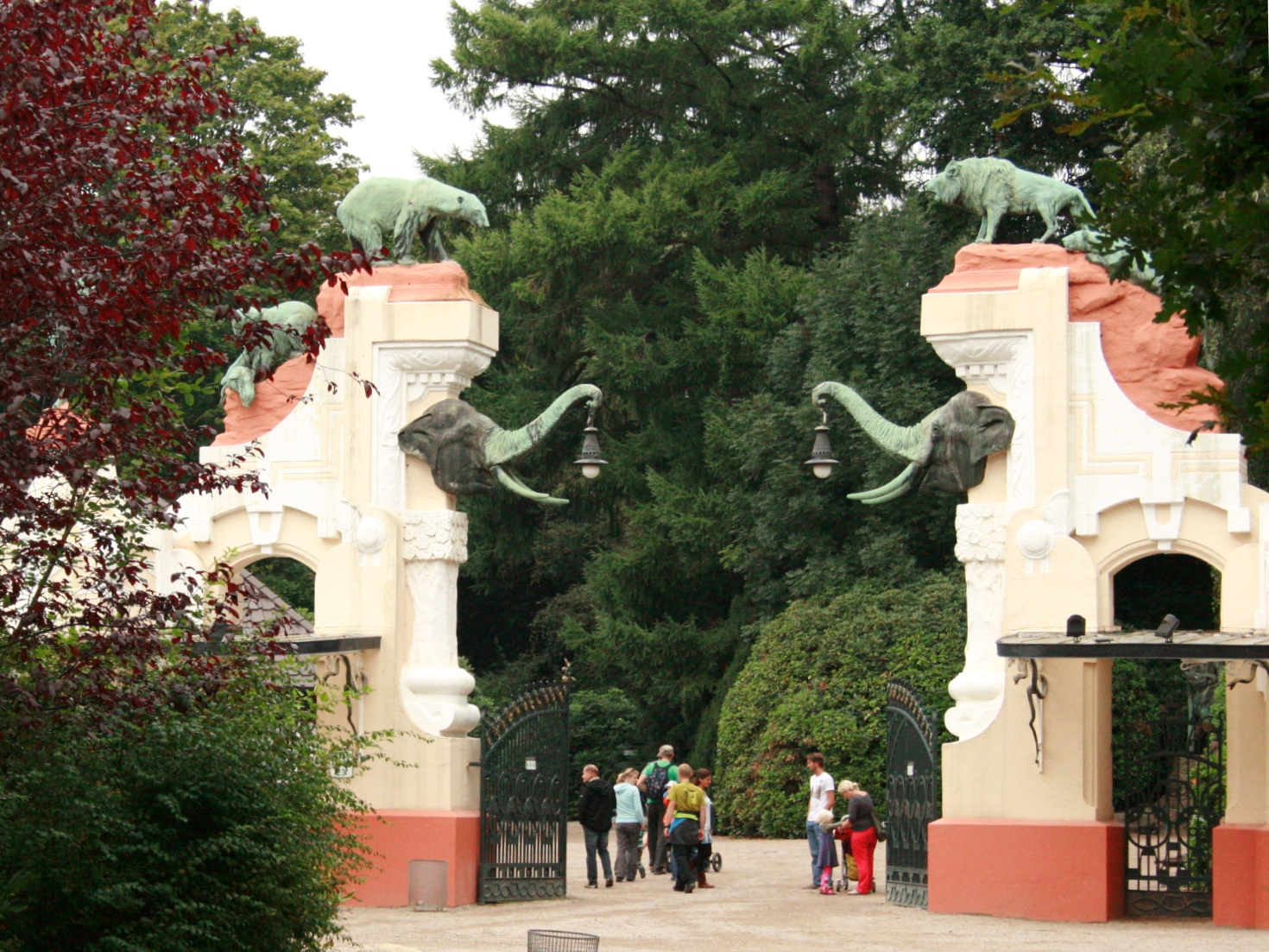
Entrance to the Tierpark Hagenbeck

During World War II, he had to part with most of his animals, due to a lack of food. His studio was seriously damaged by a bombing. Many of his works and most of his anatomical collection were lost. His surviving works were transferred to the Aquazoo Löbbecke Museum. When he died, following a long illness, his natural science collection was donated to them. He was interred at the cemetery in Lohausen, under a boulder with a bronze eagle. In 2013, an exhibit on his life and work was installed at Schloss Benrath.

== Sources ==
- O. Bauer: Ein moderner Tierbildhauer: mit 12 Illustrationen nach photographischen Originalaufnahmen. In: Reclams Universum #26, 1910, pp.591–596
- "Pallenberg, Josef Franz", In: Hans Vollmer (Ed.): Allgemeines Lexikon der Bildenden Künstler von der Antike bis zur Gegenwart, Vol.26: Olivier–Pieris. E. A. Seemann, Leipzig 1932, pg.168
- Horst Sieloff: Josef Pallenberg und seine Tiere. Ein Querschnitt aus dem Schaffen des Düsseldorfer Tierbildners zu seinem 80. Geburtstag, Kulturamt d. Stadt Düsseldorf, 1962
- Dirk Kocks: Josef Pallenberg 1882–1946. Leben und Werk des rheinischen Tierbildhauers. In: Weltkunst, #55 (1985), Vol.18, pp.2538–2542
- H. Rudolf Mückler: Josef Pallenberg 1882–1946. Sein Leben, seine Kunst, seine Tiere. Bongers, Recklinghausen 1992, ISBN 3-7647-0433-0
- Martin Bartelmus, Stefan Schweizer: Der Tierbildhauer Josef Pallenberg (1882–1946), Berlin: Deutscher Kunstverlag, 2020, ISBN 978-3-422-97983-3
