= Heinrich Hermanns =

German painter (1862–1942)

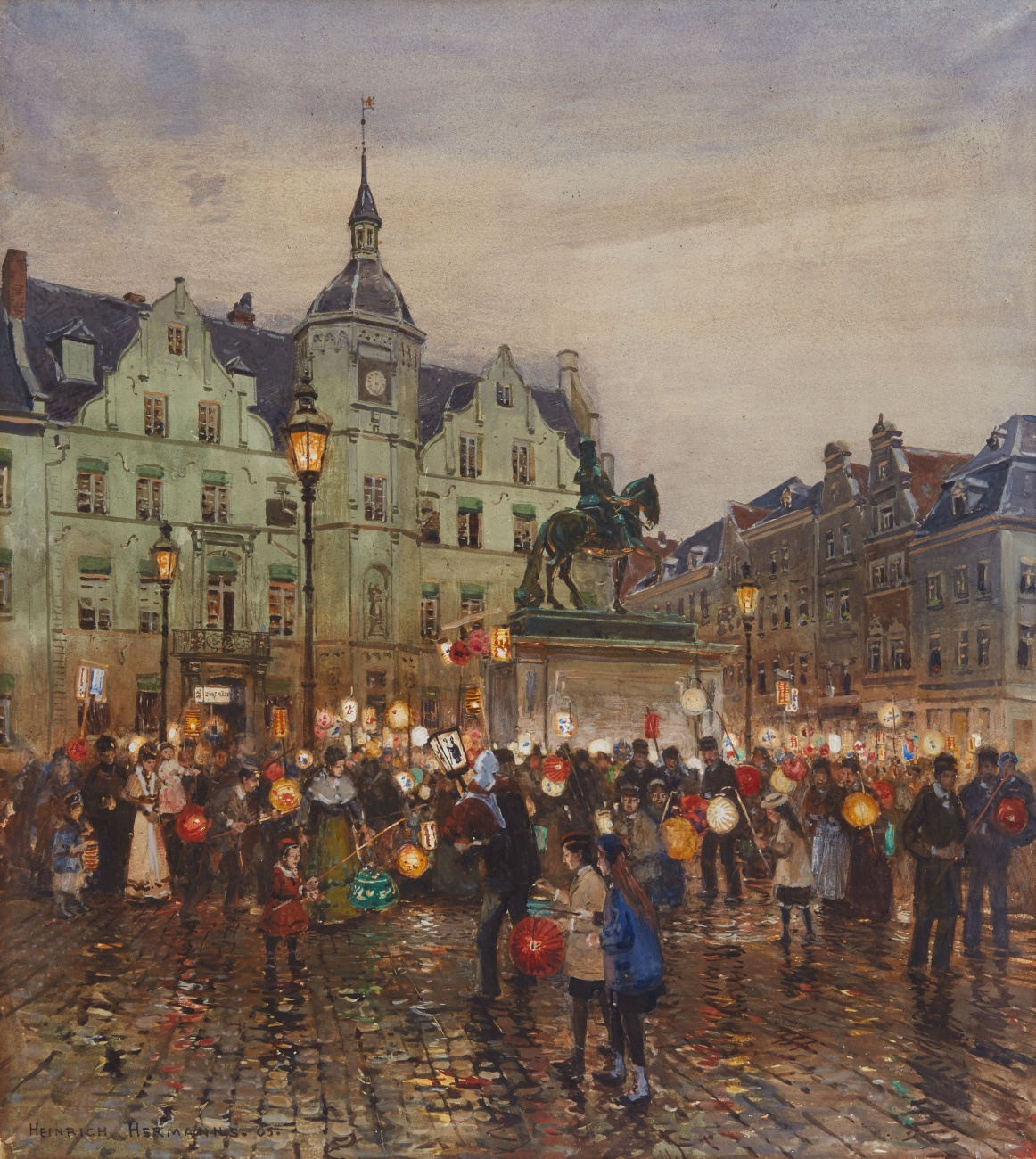
St. Martin's Day at the Marktplatz in Düsseldorf (1905), watercolor

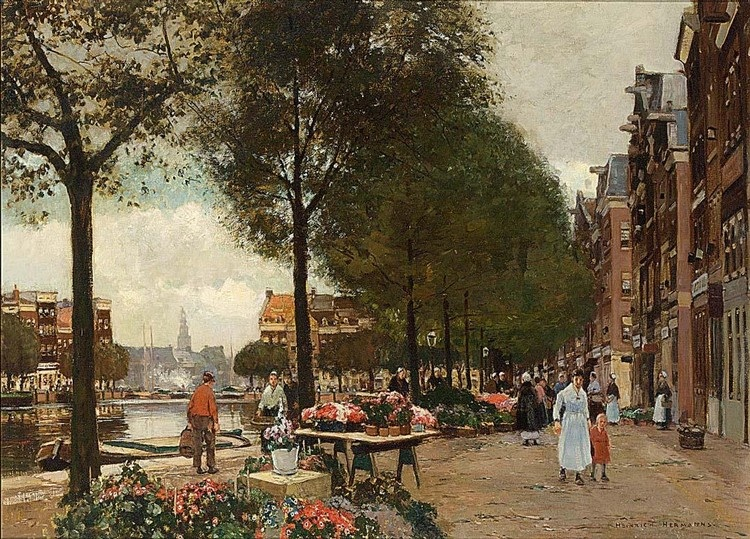
Flower Market in Amsterdam, oil on canvas

Heinrich Hermanns (19 May 1862 – 21 December 1942) was a German lithographer and landscape painter. He was also known for architectural paintings and vedute and was associated with the Düsseldorfer Malerschule.

== Biography ==
Born in Düsseldorf, Hermanns completed his primary education in 1883 and went on to study at the Kunstakademie Düsseldorf with Eugen Dücker, Heinrich Lauenstein, Georg Heinrich Crola and Johann Peter Theodor Janssen. There, in response to the conservative policies of the Kunstverein für die Rheinlande und Westfalen, he joined with Olof Jernberg, Eugen Kampf and Helmuth Liesegang to form the "Lucas-Club"; an association of forward-looking landscape painters. By 1891, the club had become subordinated to the Freie Vereinigung Düsseldorfer Künstler, and remained so until 1899, when a new "St. Lukas-Club" broke away. He graduated from the Kunstakademie in 1893.

He had a special fondness for the landscapes of Holland, West and Northwest Germany. After 1887, he was a frequent visitor to Hümmling. He also took long study trips to France, Spain and Italy, especially Lake Garda, Naples and Sicily. Later, he turned to architectural scenes and interiors; often rendered in watercolors.

Until the 1930s, he held showings at most major German art exhibitions, including the (Glaspalast in Munich, the Große Berliner Kunstausstellung and the Große Kunstausstellung NRW Düsseldorf). In 1900, he was appointed to the artistic advisory board of Die Rheinlande, a cultural journal. Hermanns died in 1942, in Düsseldorf.
