= Arthur Kampf =

German painter (1864–1950)

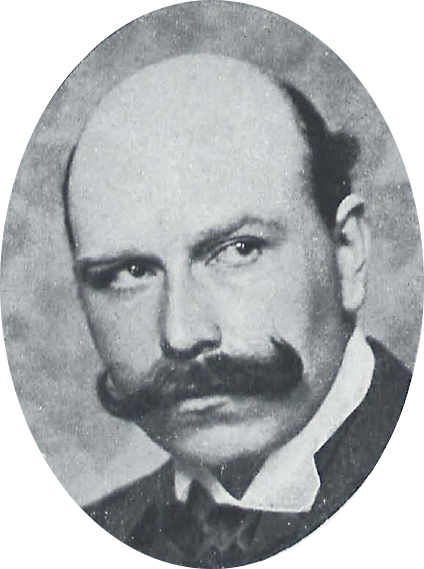
- Arthur Kampf, c. 1902
- Born: September 28, 1864; Aachen, Kingdom of Prussia
- Died: February 8, 1950 (aged 85); Castrop-Rauxel, North Rhine-Westphalia, West Germany
- Education: Kunstakademie Düsseldorf
- Known for: President of the Hochschule für Bildende Künste
- Style: History painting
- Movement: Düsseldorf school of painting
- Spouse: Mathilde Spatz (1869–1950)
- Awards: Adlerschild des Deutschen Reiches

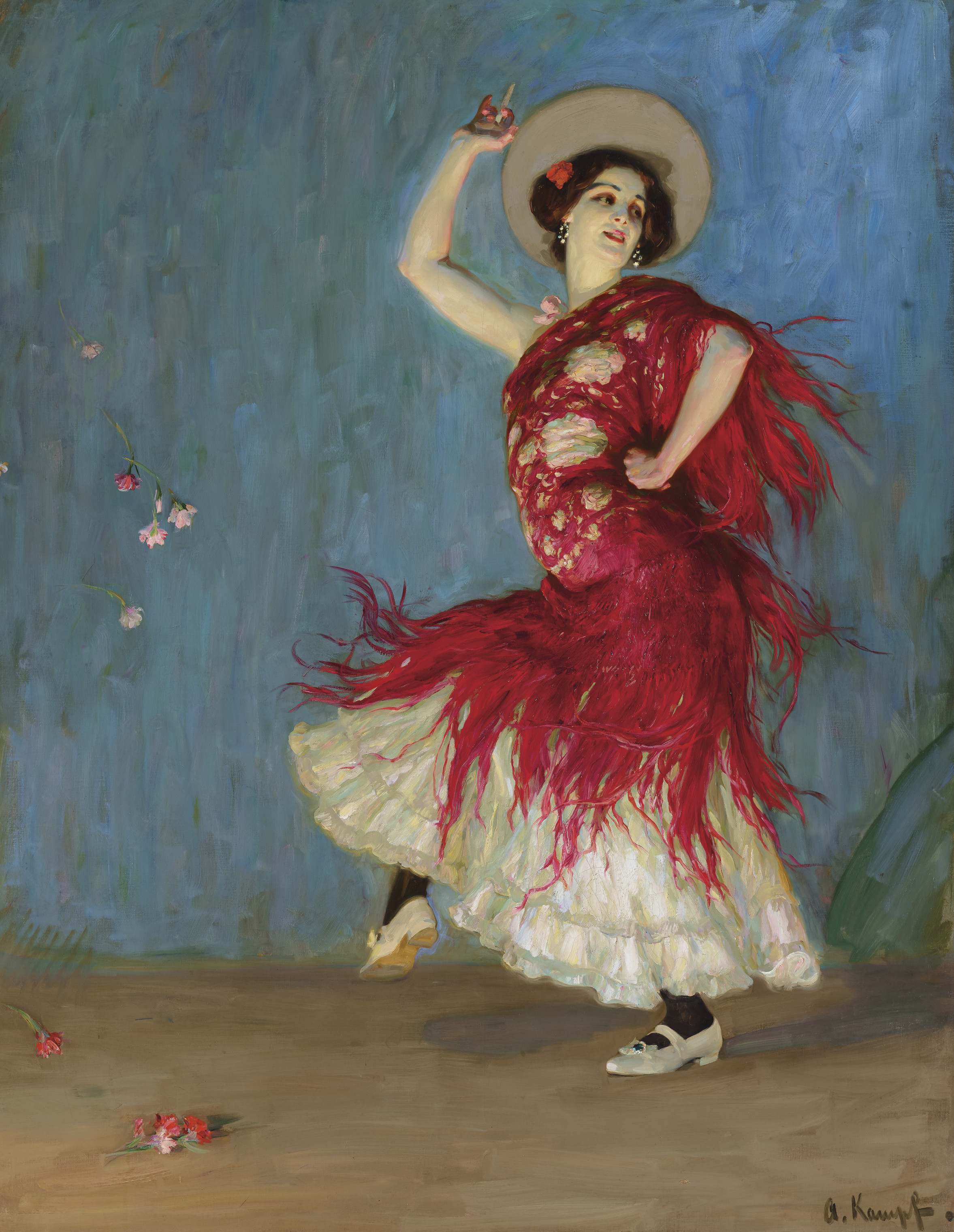
Spanische Tänzerin (likely Rosario Guerrero) (1906), oil on canvas 78 x 61 ½ in. (198.1 x 156.2 cm.)

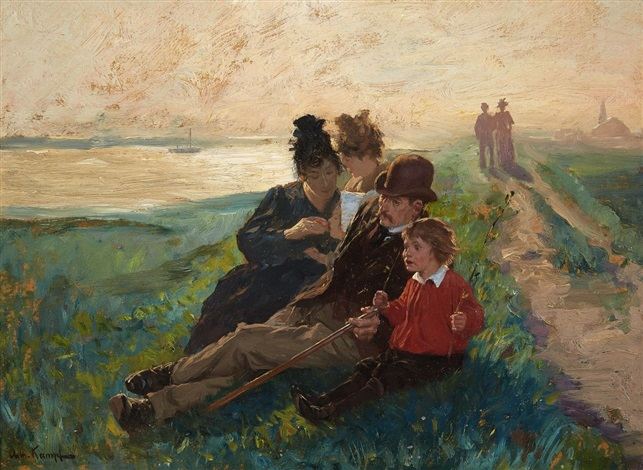
A Summer Outing On The Rheinwiese by Düsseldorf (1900), oil on panel 25.5 x 35 cm. (10 x 13.8 in.)

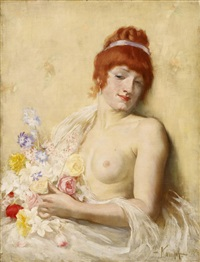
Bildnis einer Dame mit Blumen (1887), oil on canvas 82 x 63 cm. (32.3 x 24.8 in.)

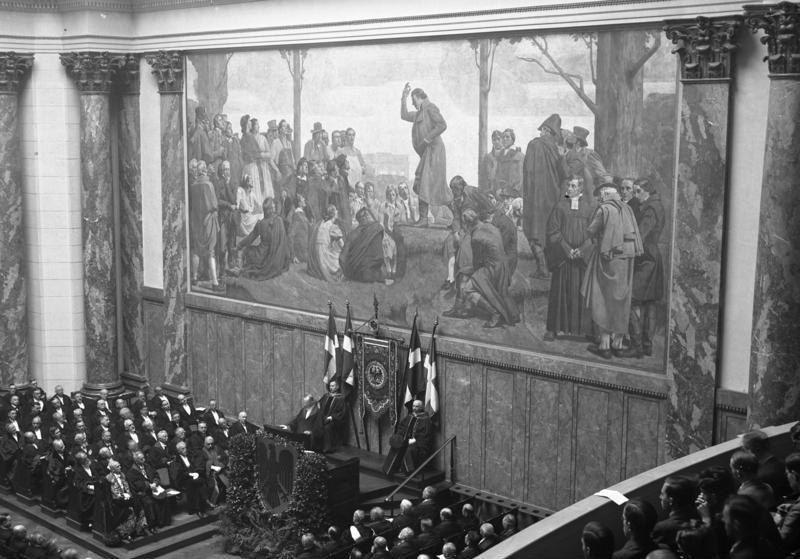
Kampf's monumental mural Fichte's Address to the German Nation (1913–14) in Humboldt University of Berlin (photographed in 1933)

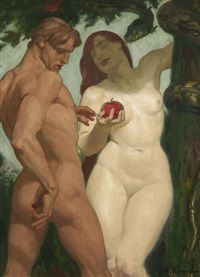
Der Sündenfall (1898), oil on wood 42 x 31.5 cm. (16.5 x 12.4 in.)

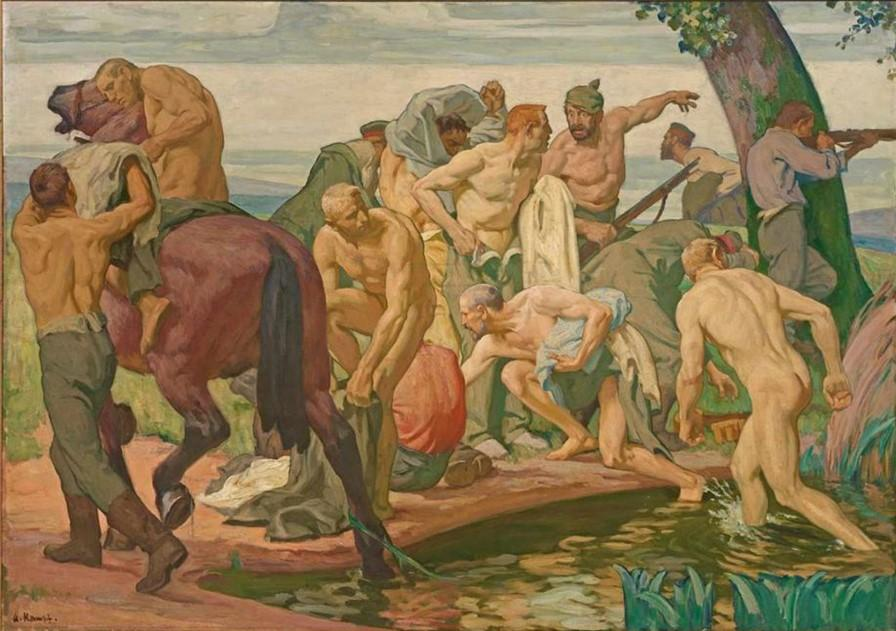
Uberfall 1917 (1917), oil on canvas 160 x 114 cm. (62.9 x 44.9 in.)

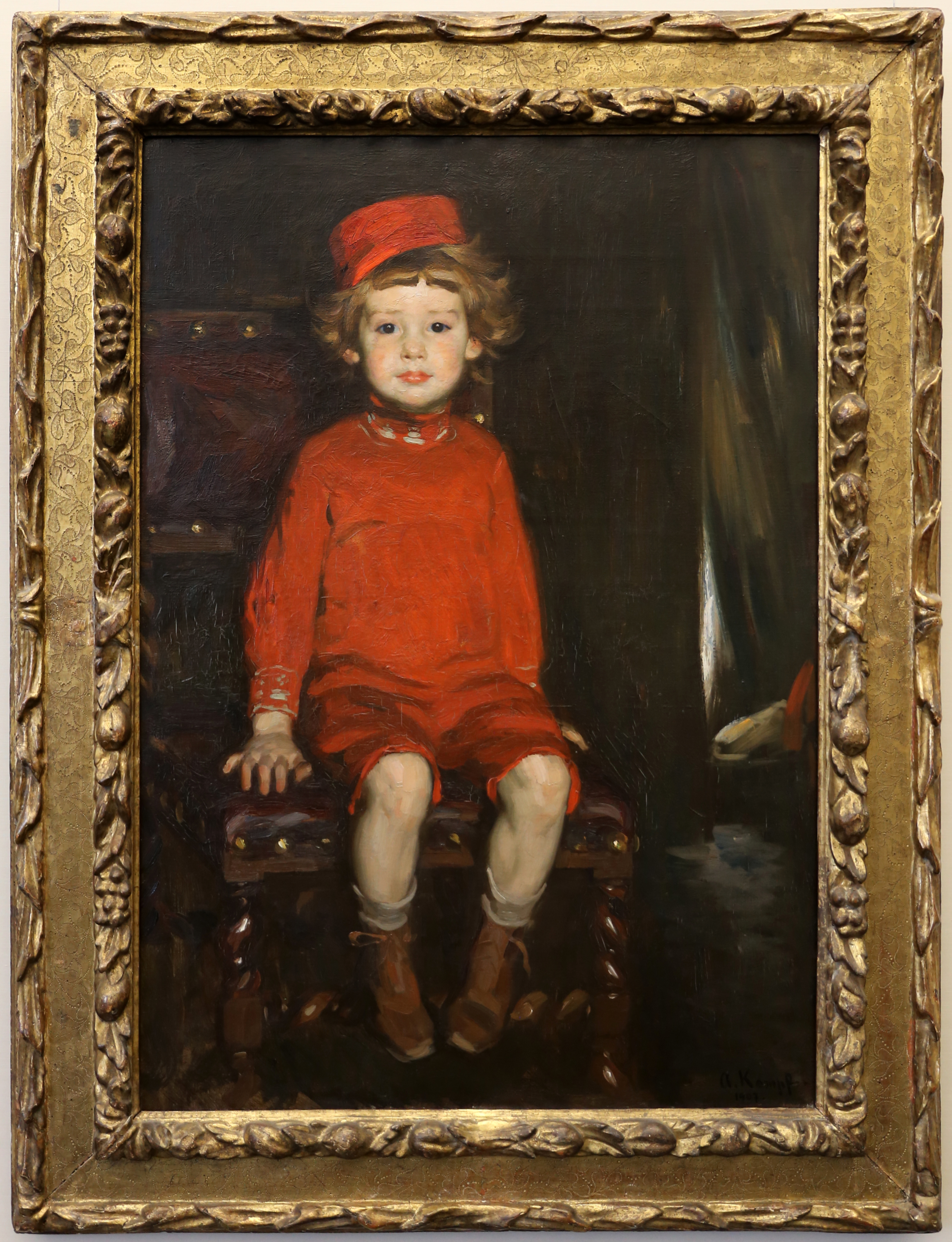
Knabe in Rot (1907), oil on canvas 100 x 70.5 cm (39.4 x 27.7 in.)

Arthur Kampf (28 September 1864 – 8 February 1950) was a German painter. He was associated with the Düsseldorf school of painting.

== Life ==
Kampf studied under Peter Janssen, among others, at the Kunstakademie Düsseldorf from 1879 to 1881.

In 1886, Kampf exhibited The Last Statement. The painting's enormous size (112.2 x 142.5 in.) and controversial subject matter brought Kampf instant fame, and laid the foundation for the types of works he would be characterized by for the rest of his career.

In 1888, a second painting, Exhibition of remains of Emperor William I in Berlin, solidified Kampf's artistic renown as a painter specializing in historical documentation. After completing his education, he became a professor at the Kunstakademie and taught there until 1889, when he moved to Berlin. There he continued to teach at the local Kunstakademie.

In 1911, Kampf was assigned the role of creating the German pavilion at the International Art Exposition of Rome.

In 1914, Kampf and art historian Ludwig Justi created the "Künstler Club", a social group of prominent German artists: Max Liebermann, Max Slevogt, Hugo Lederer, Louis Tuaillonn, Gaul, Fritz Klimsch, architect Ludwig Hoffmann, musicians, Richard Strauss and Engelbert Humperdinck, and film director Max Reinhardt.

From 1915 to 1924, Kampf was president of the Hochschule für Bildende Künste in Berlin. He also became a member of the Prussian Academy of Arts, and gave drawing lessons, notably to Prince August Wilhelm, son of Wilhelm II.

Between 1933 and 1945, the Nazi regime in Germany actively promoted and censored forms of art in accordance with Adolf Hitler's strong personal artistic preferences for classical style and heroic themes. After the Nazis seized power, Kampf became a member of the Nazi Party, his fluency with traditional German art styles and expertise at creating large-scale murals allowing him to become one of the regime's contract artists.

In 1939's "Great German Art Exhibition" (Große Deutsche Kunstausstellung) at the Haus der Kunst in Munich, he was represented by numerous works, including The Struggle of Light Against Darkness, on loan from the Reich Chancellery. The same year, he received the Adlerschild des Deutschen Reiches with the inscription: "To the German painter" (Dem deutschen Maler).

Celebrated for his life's work of paintings, many of which concerned aspects of German history, Kampf was, on the occasion of his 75th birthday, added to the so-called "List of Immortals" (1939). This guaranteed him immunity from interference in artistic work during the Second World War.

In 1944, at the age of 79, Kampf was one of 24 artists, architects, authors, composers, actors, and singers added to the Gottbegnadeten list, meaning he was considered absolutely indispensable to German culture.

In May 1944, Kampf went to the village of Lower Silesia after Berlin was evacuated during bombings by Allied Forces. In Lower Slesia, Kampf's wife, Mathilde, was killed in a traffic accident.

Shortly before his death in 1950, at the age of 85, Kampf published a memoir called Aus Meinem Leben.

Throughout his life, Kampf held membership in the Association of Rhine-Westphalian Artists (honorary membership), the Society of German Watercolorists and the Association of German Illustrators, and he belonged to the Society of Berlin Artists in Berlin (1900–1930). In Düsseldorf, Kampf belonged to the Malkasten Artists‘ Society (1887–1898, honorary member after 1947), the St. Luke’s Artist’s Club (1892–1903), the Society of Düsseldorfer Artists, and to the Free Federation of Düsseldorf Artists.

Kampf's father, August Kampf was an Aachen painter and Imperial court photographer. Kampf's older brother, Eugen, was also a well known painter.

== Style ==
Kampf's work is most strongly associated with the genre of traditional history painting, though throughout his lifetime he explored styles influenced by Impressionism and Art Nouveau. He was also celebrated for large scale portrait work and in particular children's portraiture. Kampf also worked extensively as an illustrator, contributing drawings to volumes by Shakespeare (1925), R. Herzog, History of Prussia (1913) and J.W. Goethe, Faust (1925). Kampf's artwork post World War II largely focused on religious themes.

== Legacy ==
Much of Kampf's artwork and personal papers were lost during (and immediately following) World War II.

Major surviving works by Kampf are held at museums and galleries throughout Europe, including The Alte Nationalgalerie, Berlin; Bayerische Staatsgemäldesammlungen, Munich; Deutsches Historisches Museum, as well as in private collections.

Kampf's association with the Nazi party has stirred 21st century debate. In 2018, the street Arthur-Kampf-Straße in Burtscheid, Aachen (Kampf's birthplace) came under fire between those questioning Kampf's membership in the party, and those arguing that Kampf's advanced age and the immunity that party membership gave German artists may have played a deciding factor. Critically reviewing street names, the Department of Geoinformation and Land Planning, supported by the City Archives of Aachen, announced in May, 2020 an initiative to explore details of Kampf's personal life.

== Notable works ==
- The Last Statement (1886)
- Der Choral von Leuthen (1887)
- Wilhelm I. on the Katafalk (1888)
- Portrait einer jungen Dame mit Hut und roter (1890)
- Rede Friedrichs des Grossen an seine Generale bei Köben (‘Speech of Frederic the Great to his Generals at Köben’ (1893)
- Das Rendez-vous
- Volksopfer 1813, Gold gab ich für Eise (1894)
- Der Sündenfall (The Fall of Adam and Eve) (1898)
- Friedrich der Grosse nach der Rückkehr aus dem siebenjährigen Kriege (1902)
- Otto des Grossen Beziehungen zu Magdeburg (1906)
- Spanische Tänzerin (1906)
- Artist (1907)
- Knabe in Rot (1907)
- Emperor Wilhelm II (1908)
- Die Wissenschaft bringt der Menschheit Erleuchtung und Erlösung
- Portrait eines Mädchens in blauem Kleid (1910)
- Selfportrait (1911)
- Inder (1912)
- Überfall. Entwurf, 1917 (‘The Raid') (1917)
- Der Einsame (1918)
- A Portrait of Wolfgang (1921)
- Venus und Adonis (1924)
- Der Kampf des Lichts gegen die Finsternis
- Rückkehr des Sohnes’ (‘Return of the Sun’) (1929)
- Portrait einer Dame im Art-Déco-Kleid mit goldenem Collier, Armreif und Ring
- Jungfrau von Hemmingstedt (1939)
- Die Wehrmacht schützt den Frieden des Landes (1940)
- Die Verteidigung der Güter des Friedens im Kampf gegen den Überfall der Feinde’, or ‘The Defence of the Peace’ (1941)
- Christ Teaching (1946)
- Elf Handzeichnungen, Studien zu dem Gemälde des SLM Aachener Bürger bitten General Jourdan um Schonung der Stadt
  - Nr. 1 Marschal Jourdan (Bleistift und Kohle), L 63, B 48 cm
  - Nr. 2 Säbel des Jourdan (Kreide), L 31, B 48 cm
  - Nr. 3 Dr. Vossen (Kreide), L 64, B 48 cm
  - Nr. 4 Dr. Vossen im Reisemantel, (Blei u. Kohle), H 50, B 37 cm
  - Nr. 5 Hand mit Stadtschlüssel (Kreide), H 47, B 32,5 cm
  - Nr. 6 Der Verwundete, sign A. Kampf, (Blei u. Kreide), H 36, B 31 cm
  - Nr. 7 Der Verwundete u. ein Sitzender, sign A. Kampf, (Blei u. Kreide), L 33, B 31,5 cm
  - Nr. 8 Soldatenkopf, Rückseite General Mariette (Kohle), L. 48, B 32 cm
  - Nr. 9 Soldat mit erhobener Hand, sign. A. Kampf, (Kohle), L 41, B 29 cm
  - Nr. 10 Soldat mit Pfeife in der Hand, sign. A. Kampf, (Kohle), L 45,5, B 32 cm
  - Nr. 11 Soldat mit Pfeife im Mund, L 64, B 30 cm
  - Nr. 13 Ölstudie General Jourdan, Lw., Wert 1.000 Mark, GK 651
  - Nr. 14 Sitzendes Mädchen mit Krug
  - Nr. 16 Federzeichnung mit symb. Darstellung des Roten Kreuzes, sign. A. Kampf 94
  - Nr. 48 Studie zum Aachener Historienbild, Kreide auf Papier.

== Bibliography ==
- Kampf, Arthur. In: Friedrich von Boetticher: Malerwerke des neunzehnten Jahrhunderts. Beitrag zur Kunstgeschichte. Band I, Dresden 1891, S. 640.
- Theodor Bolbehr: Arthur Kampf. In: Die Gartenlaube, Jahrgang 1908, Nr. 18, S. 380–384.
- Bruno Kroll: Arthur Kampf, Velhagen & Klasing, Bielefeld 1944, 131 S.
- Kunst im 3. Reich. Dokumente der Unterwerfung. Katalog des Frankfurter Kunstvereins, 1974.
- Berthold Hinz: Die Malerei im deutschen Faschismus. Kunst und Konterrevolution. Hanser, München 1974, ISBN 3-446-11938-8.
- Hermann Hinkel: Zur Funktion des Bildes im deutschen Faschismus. Anabas, Steinbach 1975, ISBN 3-87038-033-0.
- Reinhard Müller-Mehlis: Die Kunst im Dritten Reich. Heyne, München 1976, ISBN 3-453-41173-0.
- Otto Zirk (1977). "Kampf, Arthur von". Neue Deutsche Biographie (in German). Vol. 11. Berlin: Duncker & Humblot. pp. 90–91. (full text online).
- Kampf, Arthur - Aus meinem Leben (From my life), Introduction by August Gotzes, Aachen, Verlag Museumsverein Aachen, 1950, 64 pages and 16 black and white pictures.
