= Heinrich Lauenstein =

German painter (1835–1910)

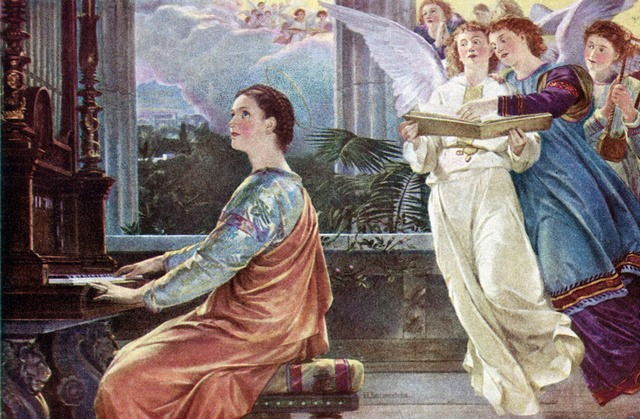
Saint Cecilia

Heinrich Lauenstein (26 September 1835, Hüddessum, near Hildesheim – 16 May 1910, Düsseldorf) was a German painter and art professor; associated with the Düsseldorfer Malerschule. He specialized in portraits, many of them of children, and religious scenes.

== Life and work ==
His father, Christoph Lauenstein, was a mill owner in Hildesheim. He worked as a decorative painter until 1859 when, thanks to a grant from King George V of Hanover., he was able to enroll at the Kunstakademie Düsseldorf. There, he studied with Heinrich Mücke, the brothers Andreas and Karl Müller, Karl Ferdinand Sohn and Rudolf Wiegmann. In 1863, he attended history painting classes taught by Eduard Bendemann then, from 1867, studied with the religious painter, Ernst Deger. That same year, he assisted Andreas Müller with murals in the new museum at Sigmaringen Castle.

While still studying, he became an assistant teacher in the beginner's class, which he headed after 1881. His best known students there included Heinrich Nauen and Max Clarenbach. From 1897 until his death, he was a professor of religious history painting at the Kunstakademie. His work in that genre was heavily influenced by the Nazarenes, whose style had become largely obsolete by the end of the 1860s.

In 1873, he became a member of the progressive artists' association, Malkasten. The following year, he married Emilie Peters. They had several children. She died in 1893. Their first-born daughter, Ottilie, married the insurance manager, Johannes Nordhoff. They had three children, including Heinrich Nordhoff, who became the CEO of Volkswagen AG.

In addition to his regular paintings, he created several altarpieces. Some of his most familiar works were commissioned by the German-American businessman and art collector, John D. Lankenau, of Philadelphia.

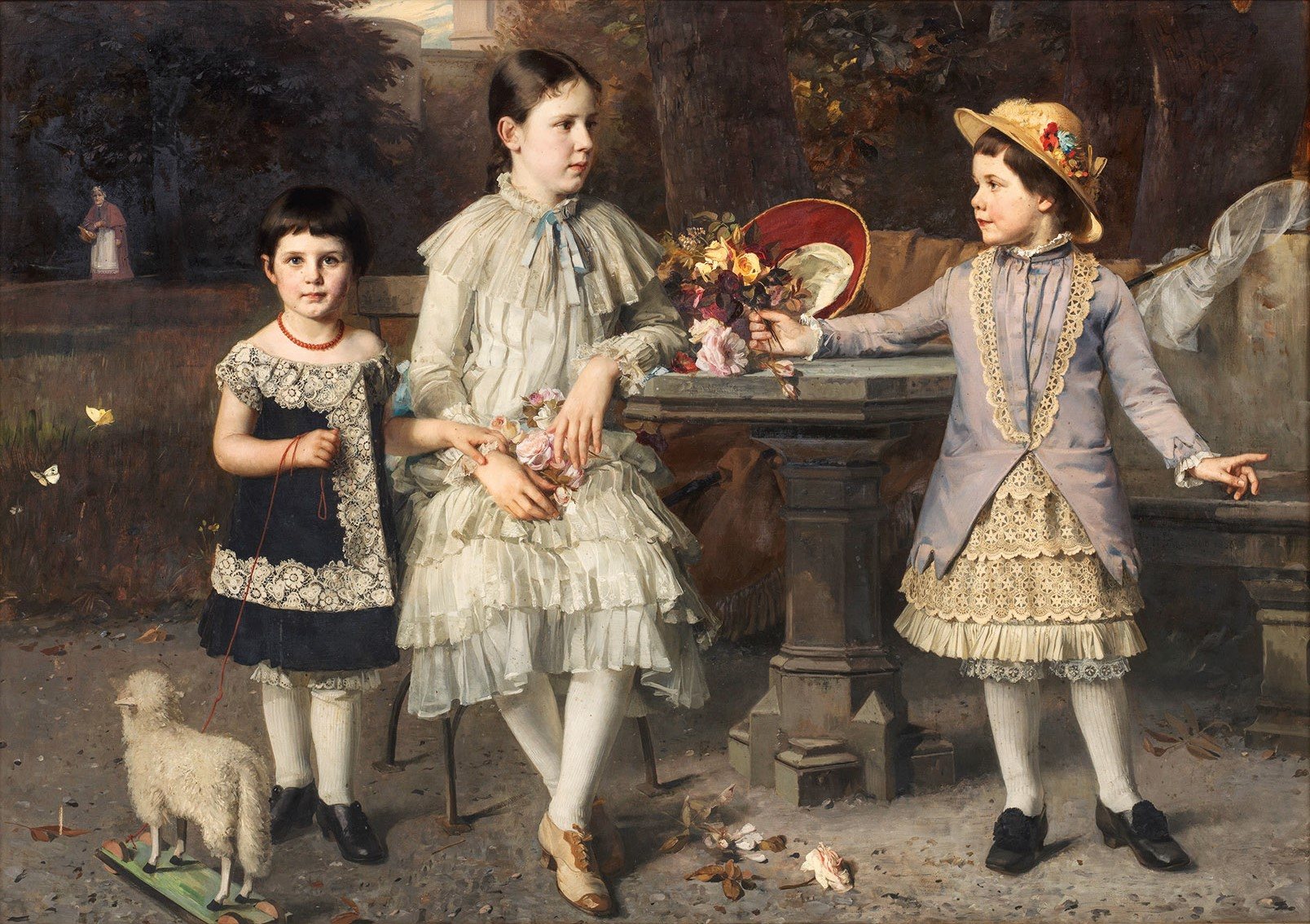
Group portrait of Hugo and Luise Schuchard's daughters

== Other notable students ==
- Georg Burmester (1864–1936)
- Heinrich Hermanns (1862–1942)
- Meinrad Iten (1867–1932)
- Heinrich Nüttgens (1866–1951)
- Fritz Reiss (1857–1915)
- August Schlüter (1858–1928)
- Wilhelm Schreuer (1866–1933)
- Friedrich Schwinge (1852–1913)
- Karl Sondermann (1862–1926)
- Fritz von Wille (1860–1941)
