= Paul Häberlin =

Swiss philosopher (1878–1960)

Paul Häberlin (17 February 1878, Kesswil – 29 September 1960, Basel) was a Swiss philosopher who at different times in his career took the standpoint that either religion or theoretical knowledge was the answer to human problems. He always gave philosophy an important role, but religion was to him the only way man could understand his real position in existence. Häberlin made contributions to characterology and psychotherapy, and was especially successful in treating psychopathic youth and teens. Made a full professor of philosophy, psychology and pedagogics at the University of Basel.

== Selected works ==
=== Psychology ===
- Der Leib und die Seele (1923)
- Der Geist und die Triebe: Eine Elementarpsychologie (1924)
- Der Charakter (1925)
- Leitfaden der Psychologie (1937)

=== Pedagogy ===
- Das Ziel der Erziehung (1923)
- Möglichkeit und Grenzen der Erziehung: Eine Darstellung der pädagogischen Situation (1936)
- Allgemeine Pädagogik (1940)

=== Philosophy ===
- Das Gute (1926)
- Das Geheimnis der Wirklichkeit (1927)
- Allgemeine Ästhetik (1929)
- Das Wunderbare (1930)
- Das Wesen der Philosophie: Eine Einführung (1934)
- Naturphilosophische Betrachtungen I: Einheit und Vielheit (1939)
- Naturphilosophische Betrachtungen II: Sein und Werden (1940)
- Der Mensch: Eine philosophische Anthropologie (1941)
- Logik im Grundriss (1947)
- Philosophia Perennis: Eine Zusammenfassung (1952)

=== Theology ===
- Das Evangelium und die Theologie (1956)
