= Malkasten =

German artists' association

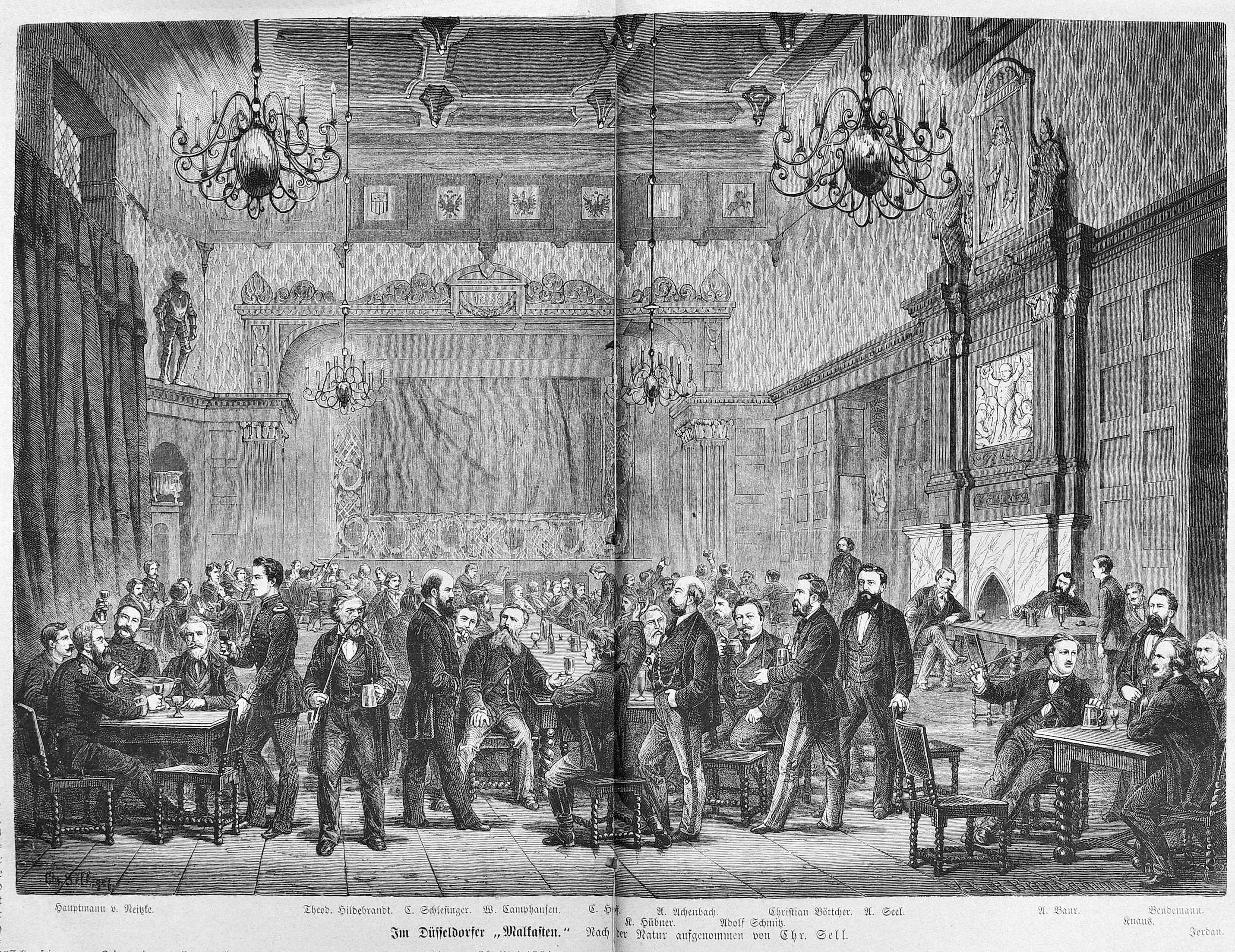
An event at the Malkasten-Haus in 1869; from Die Gartenlaube

Malkasten (English: "Paintbox") is a progressive German artists' association, founded in Düsseldorf in 1848, during the March Revolution. Since 1867, their headquarters have been in the Pempelfort district.

== History ==
During the unrest in 1848, artists also began to take part in political discussions. In August of that year, the Verein für demokratische Monarchie held an event called the "Fest der Deutschen Einheit" (Festival for German Unity). Many artists and sculptors associated with the Düsseldorfer Malerschule took part in its artistic design. On the night of the celebration, they decided to establish an artist's association which, a few days later, they named "Malkasten", at the suggestion of Karl Hübner. The name was meant to express the equality of every "color"; artistic and political.

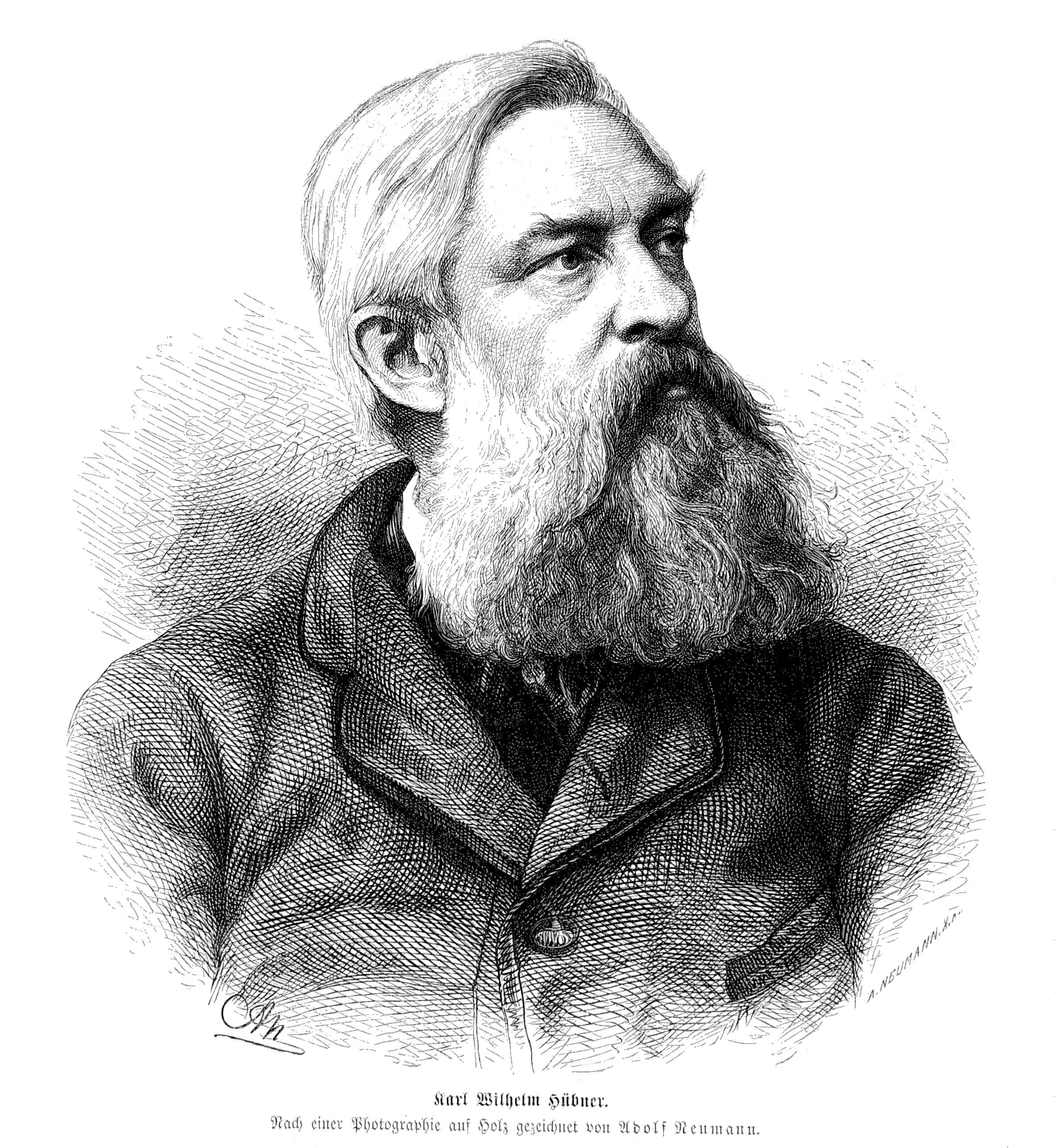
Karl Hübner, who suggested the name "Malkasten"

The 112 founding members included not only academic professors, such as Theodor Hildebrandt, Heinrich Mücke and Karl Ferdinand Sohn, but also Lorenz Clasen, the editor of the satirical journal Düsseldorfer Monathefte, as well as many members of the Malerschule; including Johann Peter Hasenclever, Joseph Fay, Johann Wilhelm Preyer, Peter Schwingen and the German-born American painter, Emanuel Leutze, who played a key role in developing an art community that was independent of the academies. Although women became active in the organization well before the end of the 19th century, they were not admitted as members until 1977.

=== Early years ===
Within a few weeks, the organization's statutes had been established, and the first Board of Directors elected. In the statutes it was stipulated that the KVM, as an "association for a sociable artistic life", should represent a heterogeneous membership and "has no other purpose than to discuss and promote the interests of art and artists, and to entertain each other socially". As early as 1849, the board was able to officially announce that almost all of Düsseldorf's male artists had joined the association. Following the decision that non-artists could join, it became a focal point for Düsseldorf's intellectual community. The composer, Robert Schumann, was admitted as a member in 1850. The public at large was able to participate in some of the group's activities, through events such as a masked ball and carnival, known as the Malkasten-Redoute, which was celebrated every year until 1938.

In 1856, a group of members associated with Leutze and Hermann Becker, called for a "first gathering" of German visual artists in Bingen am Rhein. The meeting, held that September, brought together over 160 artists from twenty-one cities, and led to the establishment of the Allgemeine Deutsche Kunstgenossenschaft (General German Art Cooperative); the first national organization of artists in Germany.

As the association grew, it became impractical to hold meetings and events in rented venues, which were often too small or too expensive. From 1857, efforts were made to acquire land on which to build a permanent meeting hall and administrative offices. They eventually focused their attention on a parcel near Schloss Jägerhof, which was the former residence of the philosopher, Friedrich Heinrich Jacobi. The City of Düsseldorf wanted to keep it from falling into the hands of speculators so, in 1861, they approved Malkasten's request to incorporate and acquire the property.

=== The Malkasten-Haus, from 1867 ===
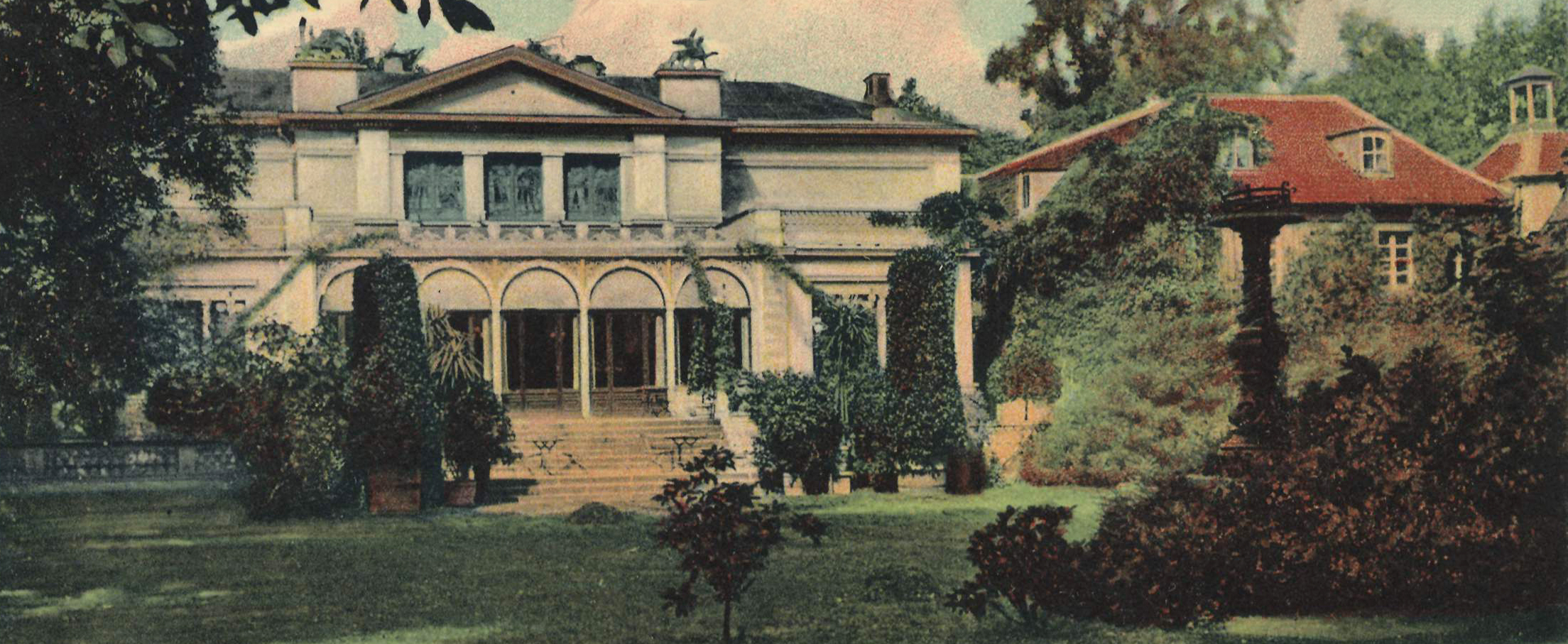
The Malkasten-Haus in 1904

To finance the acquisition, the corporation's Chairman, Otto Euler, organized a lottery. The artists provided oil paintings (in gilded frames), watercolors, lithographs, prints and photographs, as well as a marble statue; with a total value of 46,000 Thalers. Construction on the new clubhouse began in 1864, and the building was dedicated in 1867. The garden pond was decorated with a statue modeled after the "Venus de Milo", made of the metal from melted paint tubes. Due to its relatively soft texture, the statue's buttocks became the target of people with crossbows, slings and blowguns.

In September 1877, Emperor Wilhelm I was the guest of honor for the presentation of several tableaux vivants; one of which depicted General Gebhard Leberecht von Blücher, crossing the Rhine near Kaub, with Prussian and Russian forces, thereby initiating the campaign in north-east France (1814). The script for the event and the staging were produced by Karl Hoff, with music composed by Julius Tausch. This was followed by a banquet. The event made such an impression on the public officials of Düsseldorf that a mural of it was painted in the meeting room of the new Town Hall in 1894.

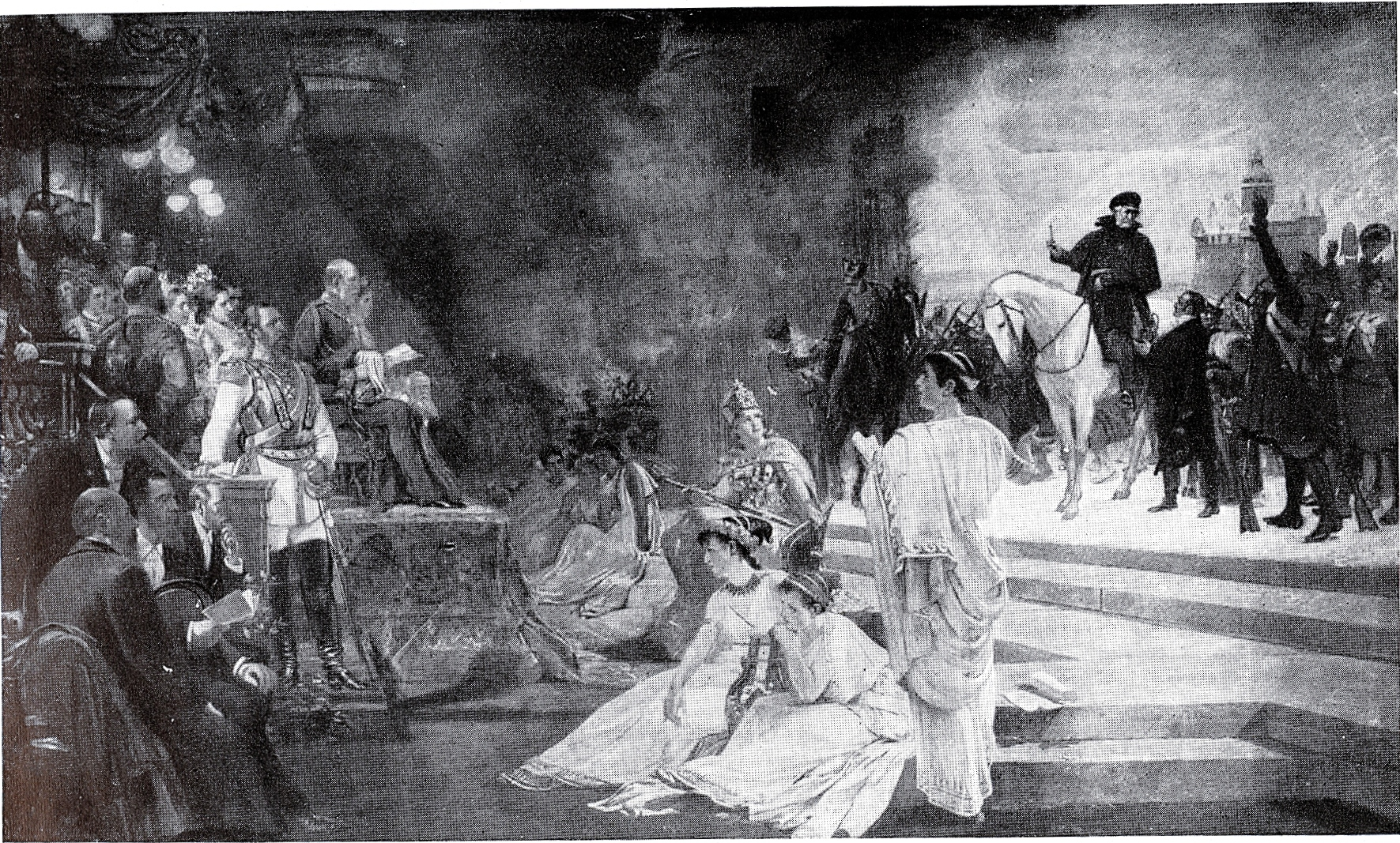
Emperor Wilhelm I at Malkasten, by Fritz Neuhaus

In the early 1880s, the Rittmeister, Armand von Ardenne, and his wife, Elisabeth, became acquainted with the magistrate, Emil Hartwich, at a Malkasten event. The subsequent love affair between Elisabeth and Emil led to a duel in which he was killed. This incident served as inspiration for the classic novel, Effi Briest, by Theodor Fontane.

For the Rhenish Millennium Celebration in 1925, the members of Malkasten staged historical-themed parades, with hundreds of costumed participants. Three years later, they presented one of the last festivals honoring the artist, Albrecht Dürer. Throughout the 1920s, they presented lectures by notable writers, including Thomas Mann.

Many Malkasten artists were persecuted during the Gleichschaltung (Nazification) of Germany, but the officials of the organization itself came to terms with the situation. Together with the Militant League for German Culture, they celebrated the "Nationale Erhebung" (National Uprising) and planted a "Hitler Oak" dedicated to "Our Savior in Dire Straits"

The membership structure itself remained unchanged until 1939, following the outbreak of World War II. Up to then, the number of members was steady at around 400. Although some sacrifices had to be made, the strong sense of community enabled them to survive the Great Depression and the Nazi regime. After 1945, their heavily damaged buildings were rebuilt, according to plans created by the architects Helmut Hentrich and Hans Heuser. Hentrich served as the first Chairman of the revived organization, from 1945 to 1955.

In 1977, Helga Radener-Blaschke was the first woman to be accepted as a full member of Malkasten.

== The present ==
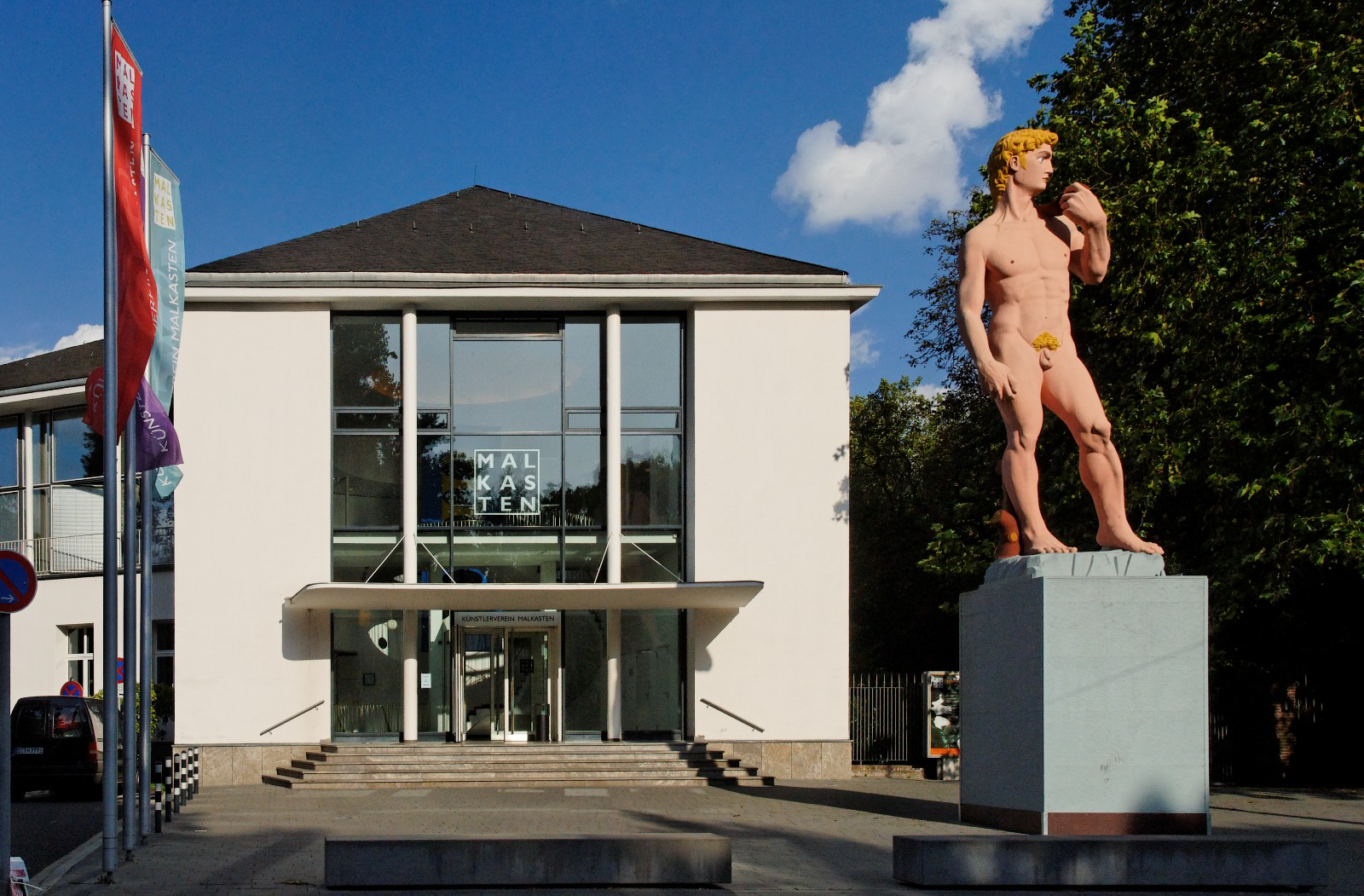
Hentrichhaus in Pempelfort

Since 1992, efforts have been made to open the premises and engage with the wider public. The "Jacobihaus" contains lounges and an archive, while the "Hentrichhaus" offers a theater, artist cellar, restaurant and bar. The surrounding park, now known as Malkastenpark, has had a biergarten since 2014. Some of the extensions and annexes are still undergoing renovation, with financial support from the Gerda Henkel Foundation.

According to the minutes of the general meeting in April, 2019, the organization currently has 302 regular members (mostly artists); down from 403 in 2002, when the last official list was published, but up from 280 in 2018. In addition, there are approximately 170 "extraordinary" members (friends and sponsors), and five honorary members.

Malkasten has four organizational units: the Künstlerverein (artists' association), the affiliated Weinkellerei Malkasten GmbH (wine cellar), their bar, restaurant and catering operations, and the Stiftung Malkasten (Malkasten foundation). The catering service has been suspended since 2014. The foundation has been officially recognized as a non-profit organization since 2012. Its aim is to support the association in maintaining its historic buildings, as well as the park, and preserve its independence.

The association's board organizes ongoing exhibitions, artist talks, concerts, film screenings, lectures and other cultural events in the buildings and in the park. Access to the events is open to all interested parties, mostly free of charge or at a low price.

== Honorary members (a selection) ==
- 1850: Anton Fahne
- 1850: Ferdinand Freiligrath
- Karl Anton, Prince of Hohenzollern
- 1857: Adolph Schroedter
- 1874: Otto von Bismarck
- 1885: Adolph von Menzel
- 1886: Andreas Achenbach
- 1888: Helmuth Liesegang
- 1897: Oswald Achenbach
- 1898: Ludwig Knaus
- 1917: Erich Ludendorff, Paul von Hindenburg
- 1946: Paul Clemen
- 1947: Gustav Lindemann
- Theodor Heuss
- 1954: Wilhelm Schmurr
- 1970: Edmund Anton Kohlschein
- 1990: Albert Fürst
- 1998: Klaus Rinke
- 2003: Peter Royen
