= Carl Murdfield =

German painter (1868–1944)

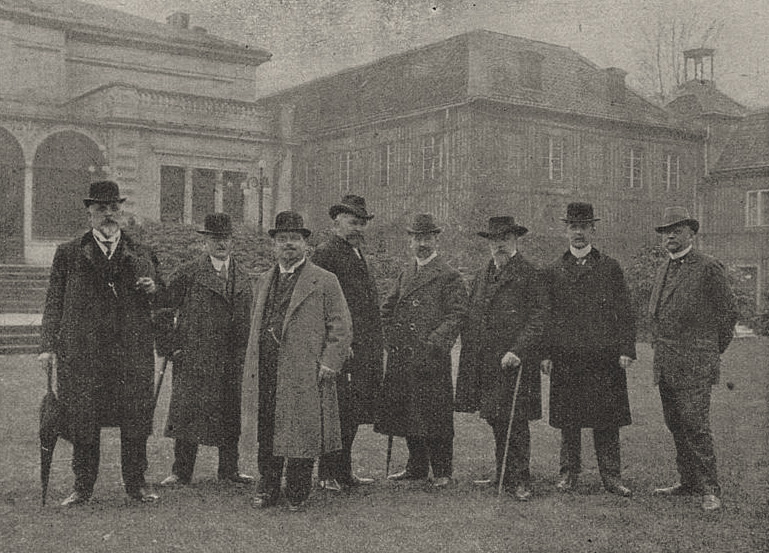
Gruppenführer der Malkasten-Redoute im Jahr 1912, von links nach rechts: Theodor Groll, Hermann Emil Pohle, Arthur Wansleben, Architekt Thilo Schneider, Friedrich Coubillier, Henrik Nordenberg, Carl Murdfield, Fritz von Wille

Carl Ludwig Alfred Franz Murdfield, also Karl Murdfield (9 June 1868 – 8 May 1944) was a German portrait and Interieurmaler of the Düsseldorf school of painting, director of the Kunsthalle Düsseldorf, Organiser of art exhibitions, archivist and chairman of the art association Malkasten, author of local and Art history anecdotes as well as City Councillor in Düsseldorf.

== Life ==
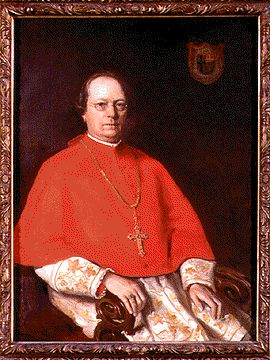
Portrait of the Archbishop Hubert Theophil Simar, 1901

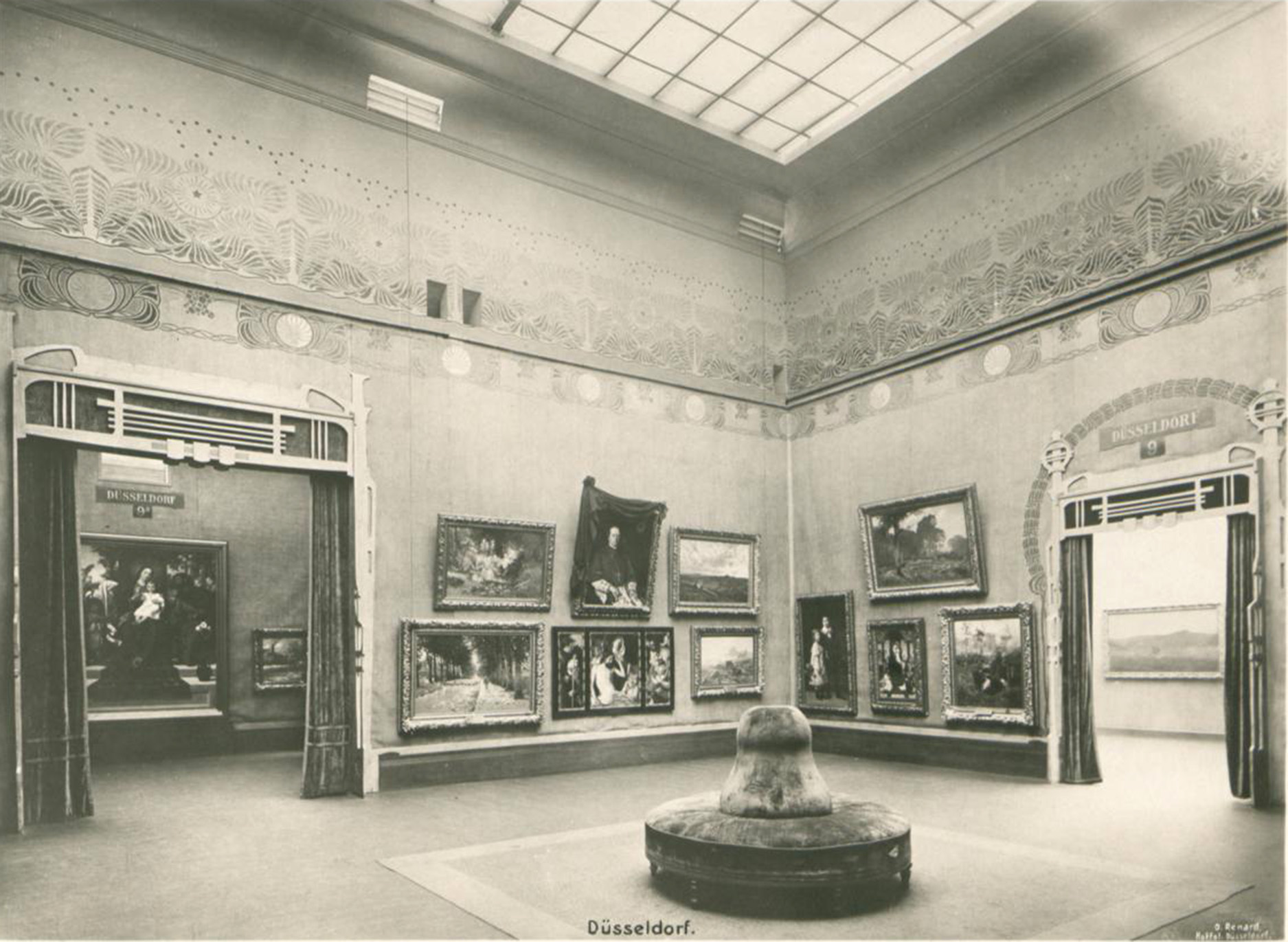
Exhibition of the Simar portrait adorned with crape in the Kunstpalast of the Industrie- und Gewerbeausstellung Düsseldorf 1902, photo by Otto Renard

Born in Rheine, Murdfield, youngest of five children from the marriage of the Catholic merchant Theodor Carl Joseph Murdfield (1823–1904) to Magdalena "Lena", née Becker (1836–1910), grew up in Rheine and attended the Düsseldorf Art Academy from 1885 to 1892/1893. His teachers there were Heinrich Lauenstein, Hugo Crola, Johann Peter Theodor Janssen, Adolf Schill, Julius Roeting and Eduard Gerhardt. During this time he was a member of the student fraternity Tartarus. After his studies in Düsseldorf, he went to the Académie Julian in Paris.

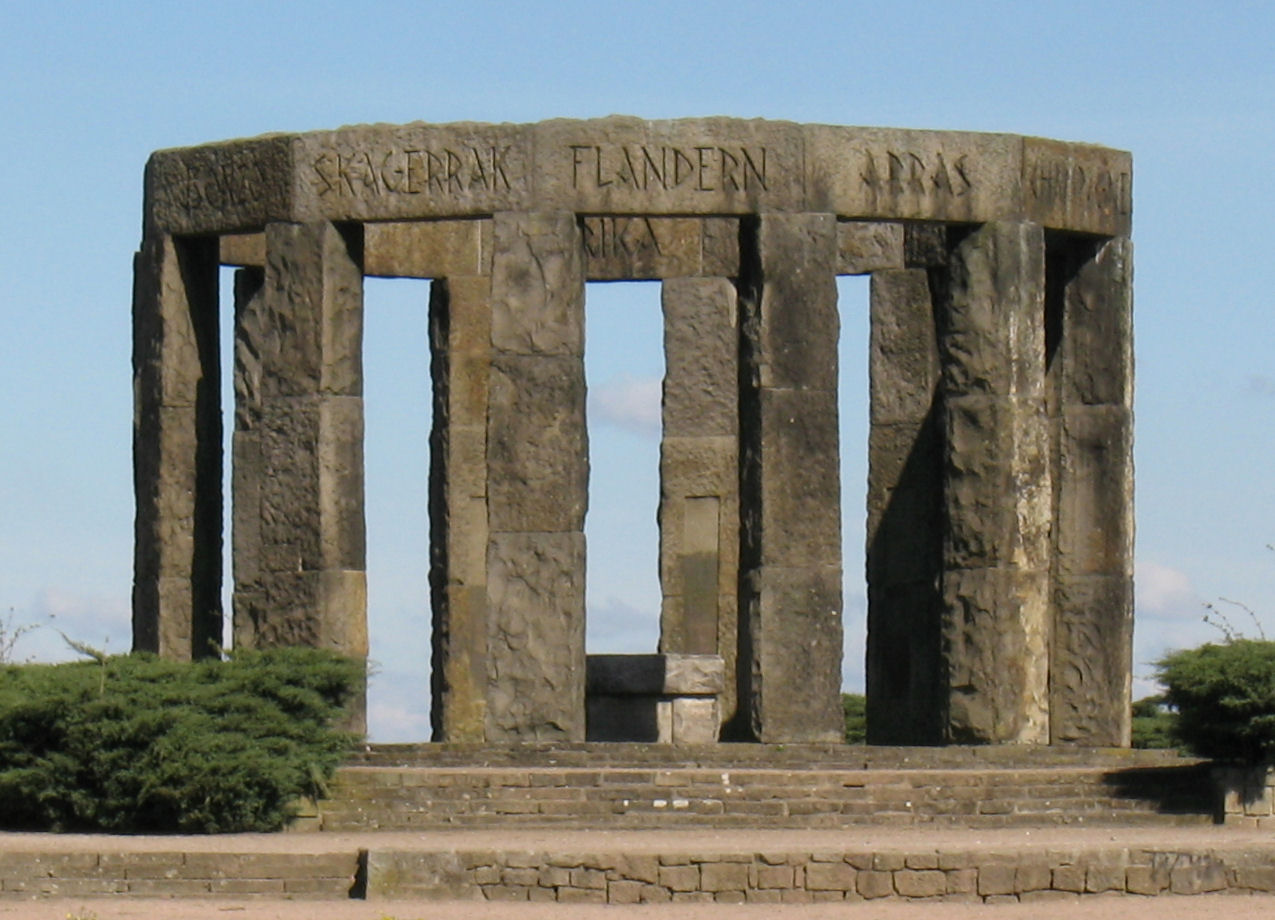
Hünenborg-Ehrenmal in Rheine

In 1896, Murdfield settled in Düsseldorf. There he became a member, later archivist and chairman of the artists' association Malkasten, also a member of the Verein zur Veranstaltung von Kunstausstellungen and, as successor to Hermann Carl Hempel Director of the Kunsthalle. In these functions he organised art exhibitions alongside his work as a portrait painter. At the end of 1934 Murdfield retired as managing director of the Kunsthalle and was succeeded by the painter Fred Kocks. In addition, he was active for the Deutsche Zentrumspartei as a city councillor in the council of the city of Düsseldorf from 1919 to 1924. Among the personalities who commissioned Murdfield to paint portraits were Archbishop Hubert Theophil Simar and the former Lord Mayor of Düsseldorf Ludwig Hammers.

On 19 April 1898, he married Bertha Offenberg (1874–1919), the daughter of the mountain councilor Ludwig Offenberg (1830–1879), who gave birth to their daughter Johanna. The painter Gisela Baur-Nütten (1886–1981), who married the painter Albert Baur the Younger around 1906, was a private student of Murdfield's in the 1900s.

In the 1920s, Murdfield designed the "Hünenborg Memorial", which was erected in 1926/1927 as a war memorial for soldiers killed in the First World War, made of rough-hewn blocks of Ibbenbüren and Baumberg sandstone on the Thieberg in Rheine. Murdfield died in 1944 at the age of 75 after a short illness in Unterjoch (Allgäu), where he is buried in the mountain cemetery.

== Publications ==
- Malkasten-Anekdoten und Künstler-Erinnerungen. Schwann, Düsseldorf 1927.
- Aus der Chronika des „Malkasten“. In Velhagen & Klasings Monatshefte, 42. Jahrgang (1927/1928), vol. 1, pp. 617–632 (PDF).
- Der Maler als Schmiedemeister. In Eifel-Kalender, Jahrgang 1931, p. 129 (Numerized, Anecdote about the genre painter Hubert Salentin).
