= Macco =

Macco is a surname. Notable people with the surname include:

- Georg Macco (1863–1933), German painter and illustrator
- John Macco (born 1958), American businessman and politician
