= Theodor Groll =

German painter (1857–1913)

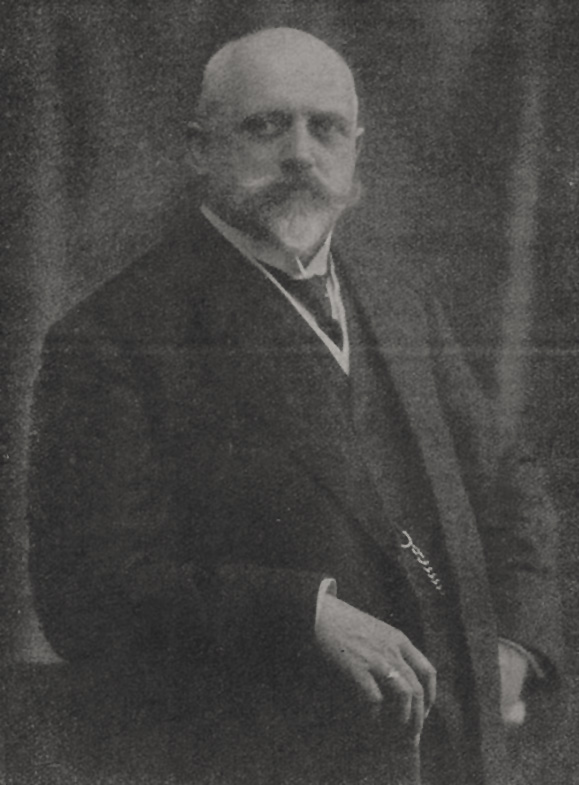
Theodor Groll

Theodor Groll, also Theodor Groll the younger (9 February 1857 – 2 April 1913) was a German genre, landscape and architect painter of the Düsseldorf school of painting.

== Life ==
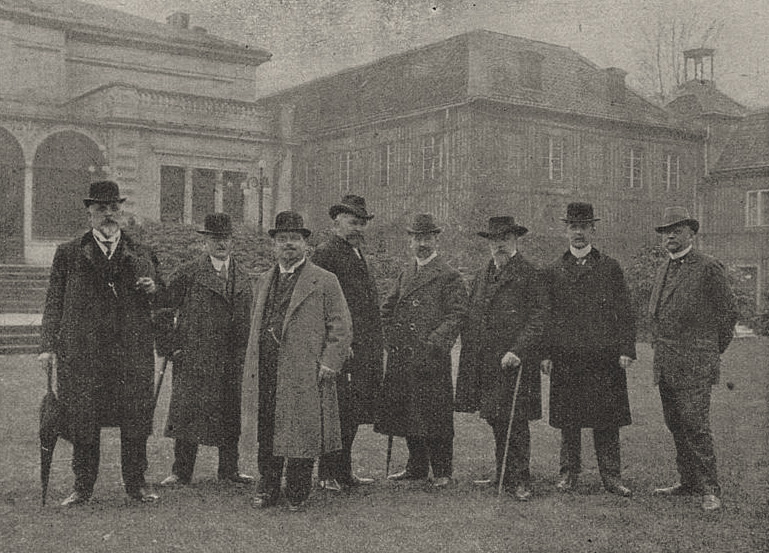
Group leaders of the Malkasten-Redoute in 1912, from left to right: Theodor Groll, Hermann Emil Pohle, Arthur Wansleben, architect Thilo Schneider, Friedrich Coubillier, Henrik Nordenberg, Carl Murdfield, Fritz von Wille

Groll was born in Düsseldorf as the son of a glove maker and writer Theodor Groll (b. 1831). In 1878, he completed his school education at the Humboldt-Gymnasium Düsseldorf. He then attended the Berlin Bauakademie, where he graduated as master builder. He later changed his discipline and became a private pupil of the Düsseldorf landscape and veduta painter Caspar Scheuren. Groll undertook numerous study trips, several times to Italy. In April 1890 he visited Rome. From 1892, he stayed in the U.S. for several years. In 1893, he was a judge at the World's Columbian Exposition in Chicago. In 1896, he travelled through southern and central German cities. In 1904, Groll founded the November Group together with the painters Hans Deiker, Carl Haver, Carl Ernst Bernhard Jutz, Gustav Rutz, Emil Schultz-Riga and others in Düsseldorf. Groll was a member of the Verein der Düsseldorfer Künstler and the Malkasten, which he served as chairman for several years. Groll died in Düsseldorf at age 56.

== Work ==
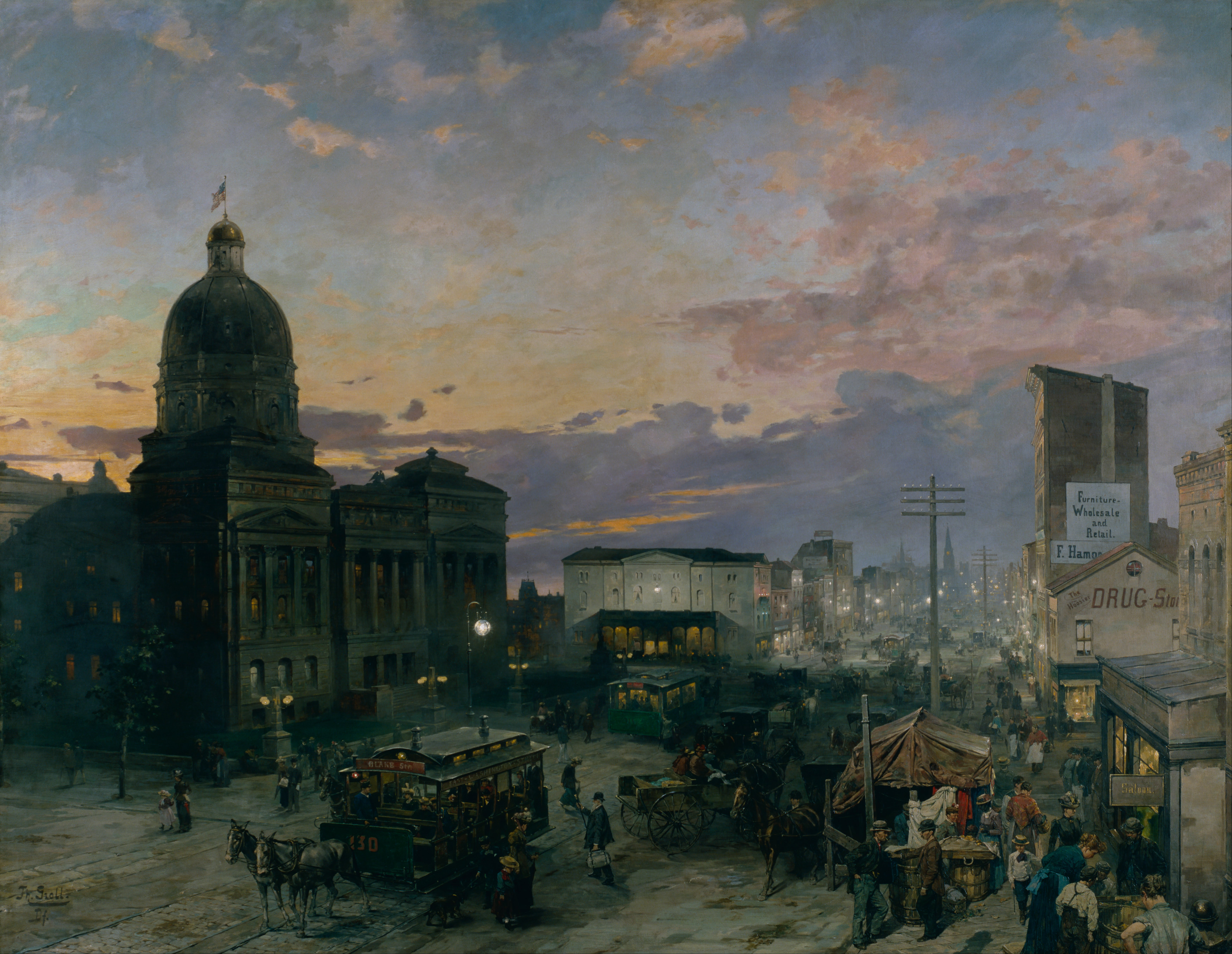
Washington Street (Indianapolis At Dusk) – abendliche Straßenszene in Indianapolis vor dem alten Marion County Courthouse, 1893

Groll made a special name for himself with his fine, detailed architectural painting. Besides Oswald Achenbach, Albert Flamm and others he belongs to the "Italian painters" of the Düsseldorf School. At an international art auction in 2013, Groll's Afternoon in Venice was sold for 58,750 euro.

- Pompei (Blick zum Apollo-Tempel), 1891, Volmer Foundation Collection.
- Markt in Verona, ca. 1891, Museum Kunstpalast.
- Washington Street (Indianapolis At Dusk), Indianapolis Museum of Art
- Auf einer Straße vor Florenz, 1899.
- Titusbogen im Forum Romanum in Rom, 1900
- Riva am Gardasee
- Die Burg Sirmione am Gardasee, 1902
- Schloss Benrath (Blick auf das Corps de Logis)
- Piazza del Campo (Siena), 1906
- Nachmittag in Venedig, 1907
- Venedig (Die Portal della Carta zwischen San Marco und dem Dogenpalast), 1907
- Venezianischer Palazzo
