= Heinrich Petersen =

Heinrich Petersen may refer to:

- Heinrich Petersen-Angeln (1850–1906), German painter
- Heinrich Petersen (naval officer) (1902–1963), German U-boat machinist in World War II
- Heinrich Petersen (SS officer) (1904–1945), Standartenführer in the Waffen-SS during World War II
