= Carl Ernst Bernhard Jutz =

German painter (1873–1915)

Carl Ernst Bernhard Jutz, also Carl Jutz der Jüngere (14 March 1873 – 17 September 1915) was a German landscape painter of the Düsseldorf school of painting.

== Life ==
Jutz was born in Düsseldorf, the son of the animal painter Carl Jutz and his wife Sybilla Karolina, née Adloff, the daughter of the landscape painter Carl Adloff. There, he grew up in a house where poultry was kept in the garden for his father's animal painting. He began his studies in painting at the Staatliche Akademie der Bildenden Künste Karlsruhe under Gustav Schönleber and continued at the Kunstakademie Düsseldorf, where he was Meisterschüler of Eugen Dücker. Jutz undertook extensive study trips, including to Transylvania, whose motifs he captured in watercolour and oil. Many of his pictures show Eifel landscapes. He was regularly represented at international, national and Düsseldorf art exhibitions. He served as second chairman of the Düsseldorf Große Kunstausstellung NRW Düsseldorf. He was also a member of the Verein der Düsseldorfer Künstler. Together with Hans Deiker, Theodor Groll, Emil Schultz-Riga and others, Jutz founded the Novembergruppe in Düsseldorf in 1904. Like his father, Jutz was also a member of the Malkasten. A photo from 1910 shows Jutz with an easel in front of a winter backdrop.

Jutz died near Radun (now Belarus) on the East Front (WWI) at the age of 42.

== Work ==
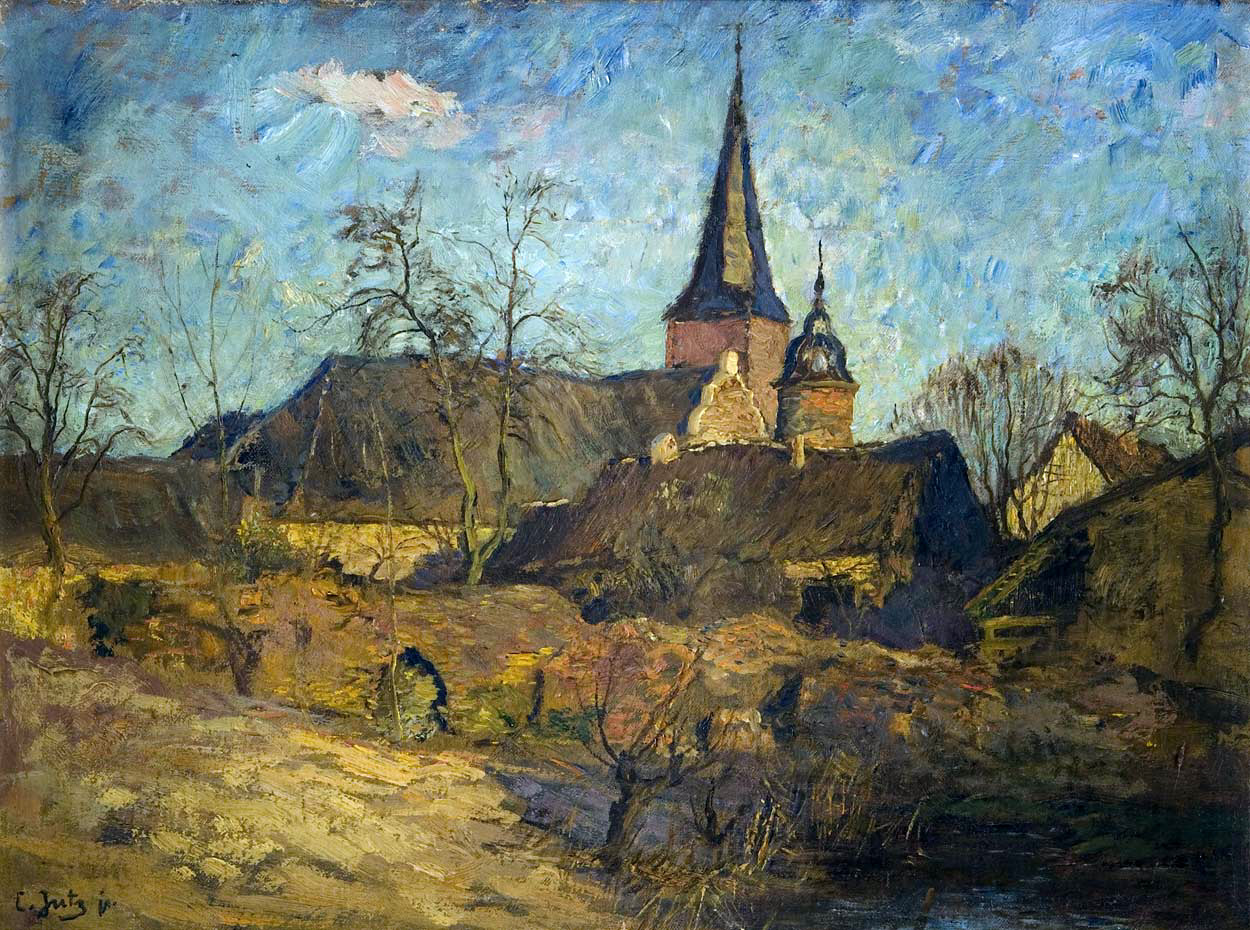
Dorflandschaft

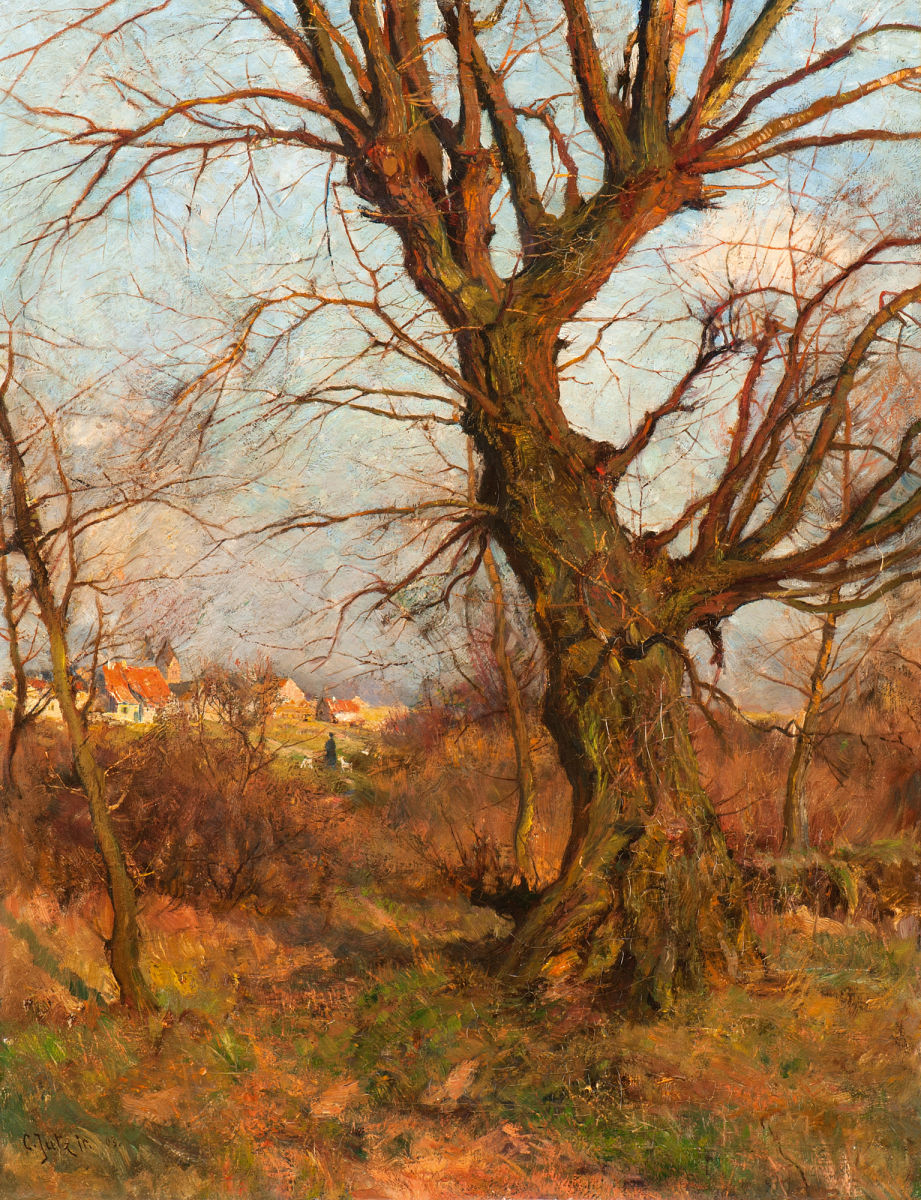
Herbstliche Landschaft mit Dorf im Hintergrund, 1903

Jutz's landscape painting was founded in the romantic tradition of the Düsseldorf School and developed towards a broad Late Impressionist style. Painting with brightened, strongly luminous colouring, atmospheric landscapes characterize his later work. A few animal paintings can also be found in his oeuvre.

- Alter Baum mit Landschaft, Museum Kunstpalast, Düsseldorf.
- Hühnerstall
- Dorflandschaft
- Kiefernwald mit Waldkapelle
- Schloss Bürresheim bei Mayen in der Eifel
- Schafherde bei der Ruine Nothberg in der Eifel
- Mühlteich, um 1900
- Herbstliche Landschaft mit Dorf im Hintergrund, 1903
- Dorf am Rhein
- Herbstmorgen an der Erft
- Wäscherinnen am Waldbach
- Reetgedeckte Bauernhäuser
- In der Eifel (Reusenfischer im Kahn)
- Kirche in der Eifel
