= Ojomu Beach =

Beach in Lagos State, Nigeria

Coordinates: 6°25′22″N 3°31′25″E

Ojomu Beach, also known as ‘’‘Alpha Beach’‘’, is a beach located in the Okun Alfa community of Eti-Osa Local Government Area, Lagos State, Nigeria. Situated along the Atlantic coastline, the beach has historically served as a recreational destination and forms part of the coastal landscape of eastern Lagos. The beach and the surrounding Okun Alfa community have received attention due to the effects of coastal erosion, flooding, and ocean surge events affecting parts of the Lagos coastline. Ojomu Beach has also been identified as a cultural and tourism site within Lagos State and is associated with community activities and coastal recreation.

== See also ==
- Climate change in Nigeria
