= Emil Schultz-Riga =

German painter (1872–1931)

Emil Schultz-Riga (1872 – 2 November 1931) was a Baltic Germans-Russian landscape painter of the Düsseldorf school of painting. He also worked with portraits and floral still lifes.

== Life ==
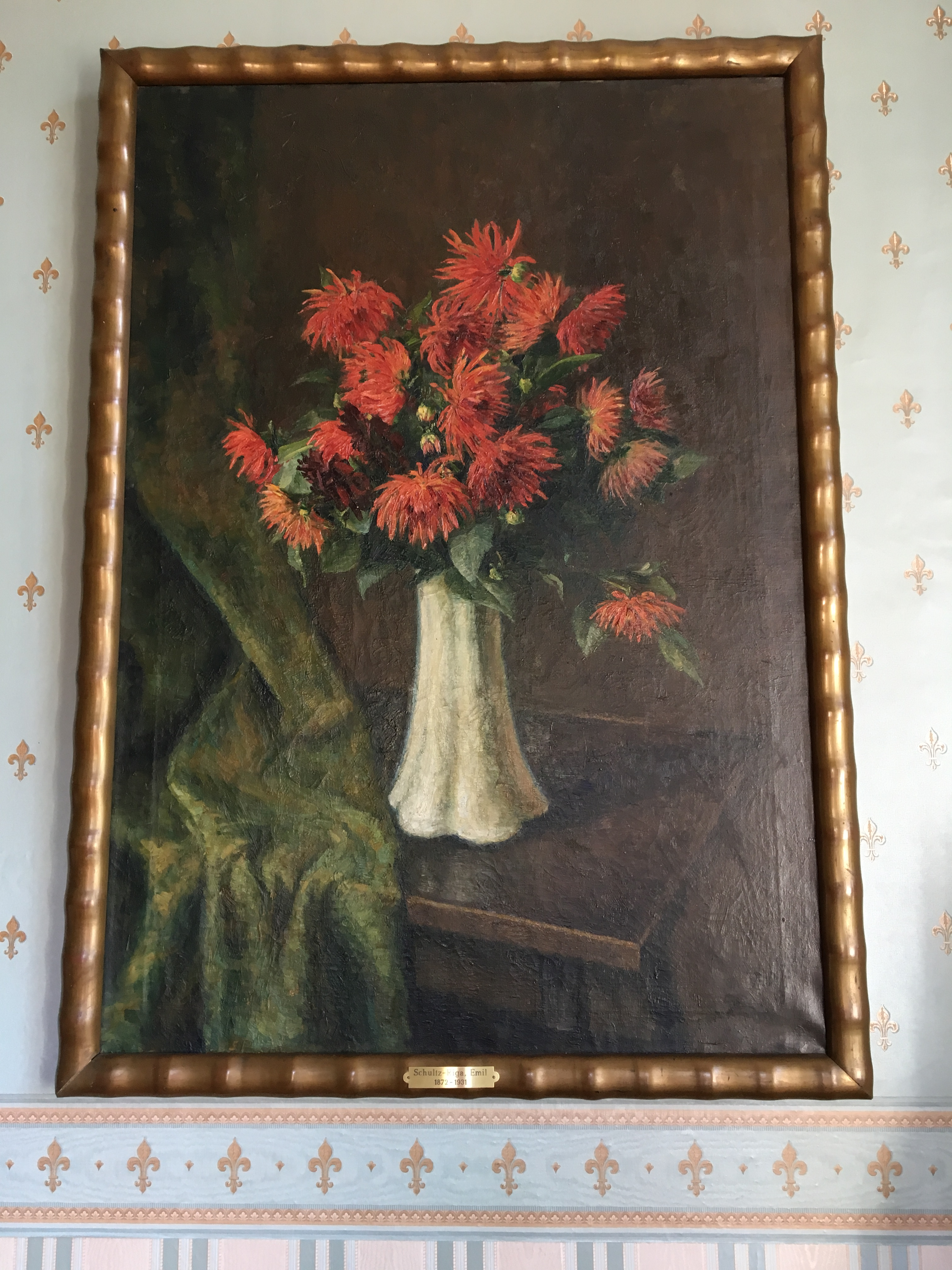
Dahlias Flower Still Life, Villa Haas collection.

Born in Daugavpils, Russian Empire, Schultz-Riga studied from 1892 to 1895 at the Kunstakademie Düsseldorf. There, Heinrich Lauenstein, Hugo Crola, Johann Peter Theodor Janssen, Arthur Kampf and Adolf Schill were his teachers. Schultz-Riga was a member of the artists association Malkasten. Together with Hans Deiker, Theodor Groll, Carl Ernst Bernhard Jutz and others, Schultz-Riga founded the Novembergruppe. He was represented at the Große Berliner Kunstausstellung in 1909.

Schultz-Riga died in Düsseldorf.
