= Carl Wuttke =

German painter

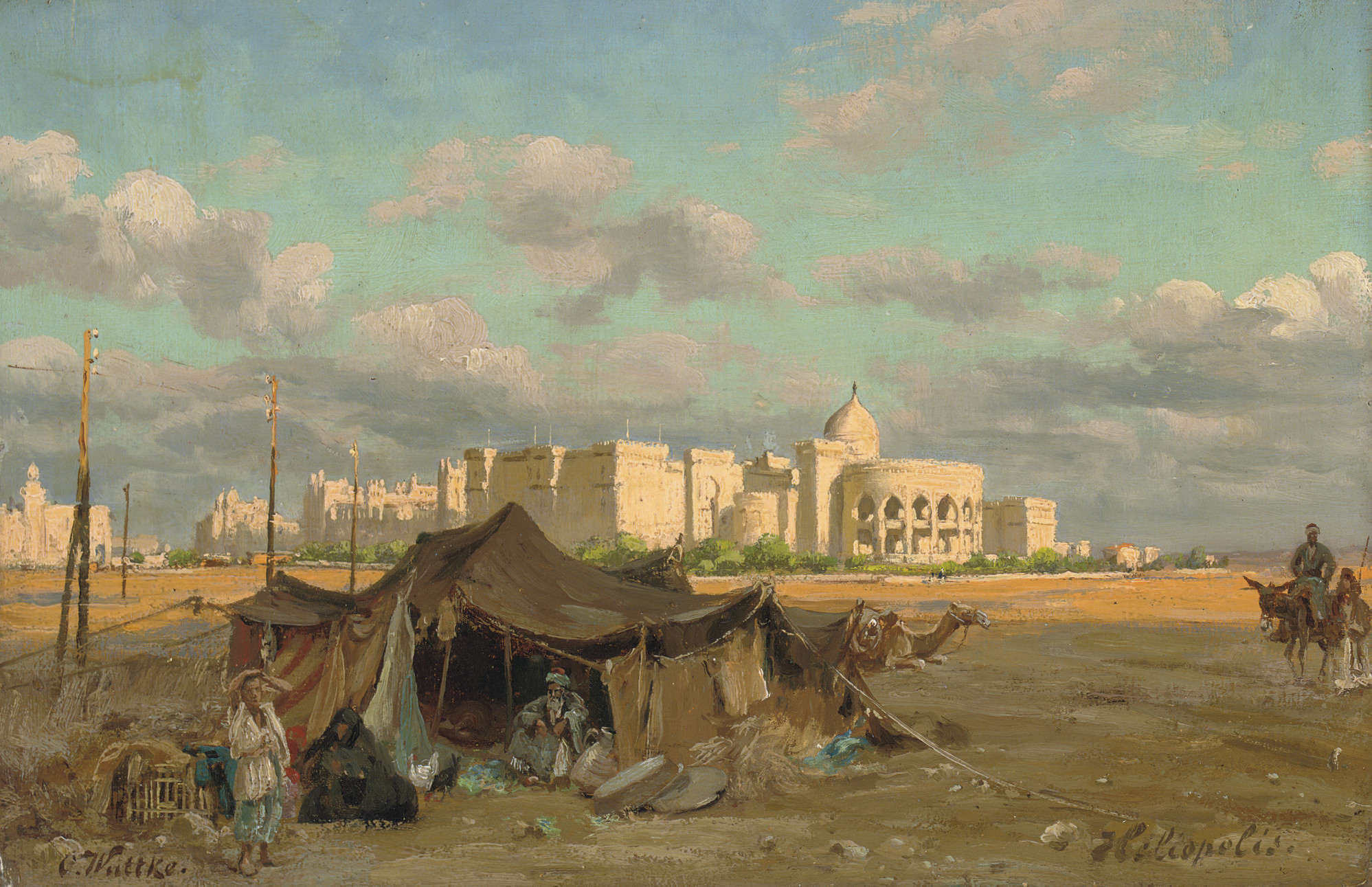
Heliopolis, Cairo

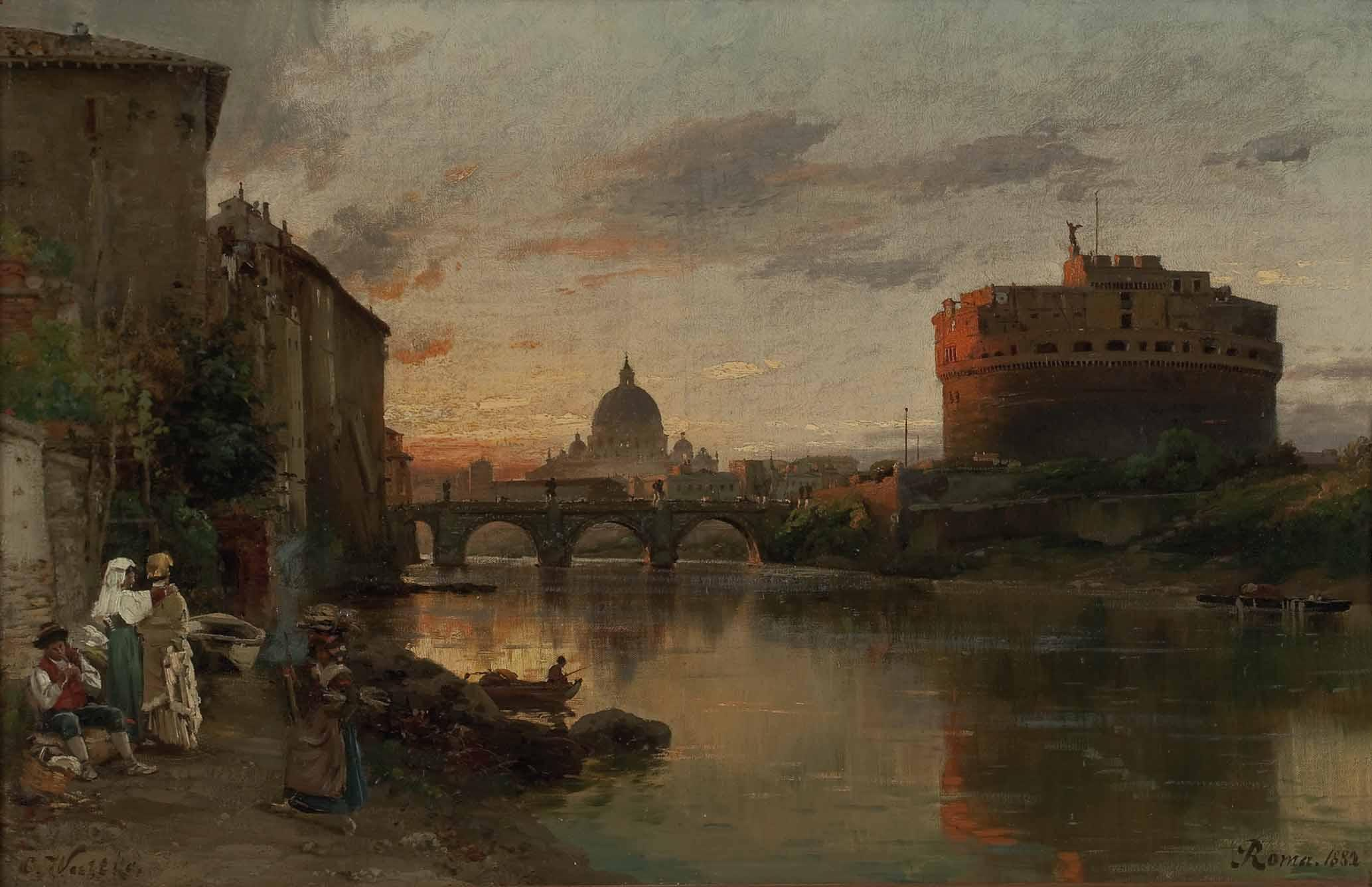
Evening on the Tiber, near Castel Sant'Angelo

Carl Wuttke (3 January 1849, Trebnitz - 4 July 1927, Munich) was a German landscape and architectural painter.

== Biography ==
From 1871 to 1873, he studied at the Berlin University of the Arts, then with Angelo Quaglio in Munich. In 1874, he travelled by foot to Italy and remained there until 1876. After returning to Germany, he studied with Eugen Dücker at the Kunstakademie Düsseldorf until 1880. After 1885, he resided in Munich.

Later, he returned to Italy, visiting Sardinia and Sicily as well. Many of his best-known works were sketched in those locations. He also made brief trips to Andalusia (1880) and Norway (1894), and travelled to North Africa (Algeria, Egypt) and the Sudan. In 1893, he visited the United States and, from 1897 to 1899 traversed around the world, stopping in China and Japan (1898). His sketches from the latter would be the subjects of paintings for Kaiser Wilhelm II, which were hung in the "Silbersaal" (Silver Hall) of the Berliner Stadtschloss.

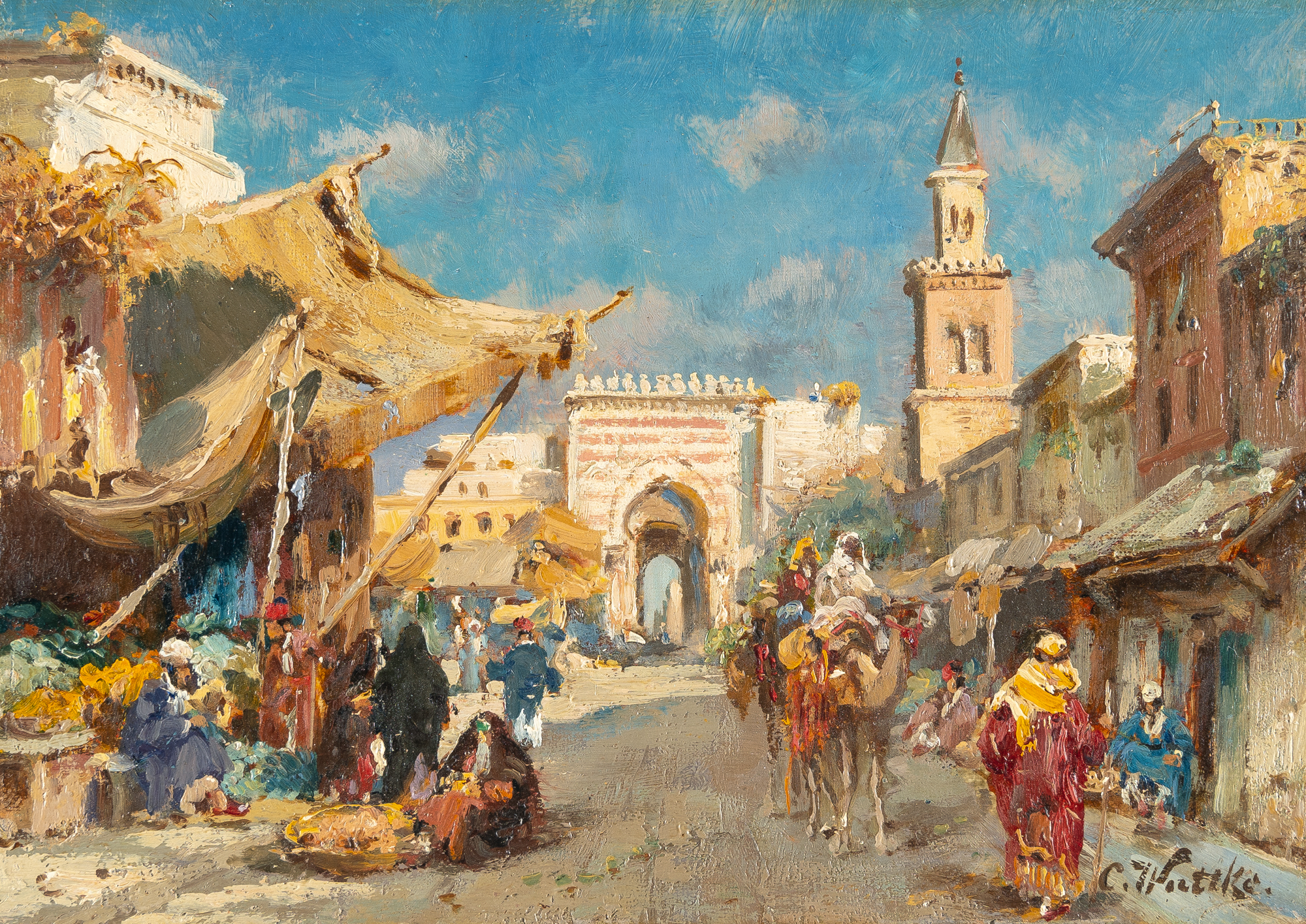
Baghdad street scene, c. 1900

His landscapes often include small genre scenes. As he progressed, his colors tended to grow brighter and his brushwork less precise, so that his later work is often loosely described as "Impressionist", but he never associated himself with the Secessionist movement.

== Writings ==
- Reise-Erinnerungen von Studienfahrten rings um die Erde (Travel memories of study trips around the world), Franz'sche Buchdruckerei, Munich, 1914
