= Gisela Baur-Nütten =

German painter (1886–1981)

Gisela Baur-Nütten, complete name Gisela Maria Pauline Coelestine Nütten, (12 May 1886 – 10 September 1981) was a German painter and graphic designer of the Düsseldorf school of painting.

== Life ==
Born in Düsseldorf, Baur-Nütten grew up as the daughter of the Royal Prussian officer Karl (Charles) Eugen Maria Heinrich Nütten (b. 1847 in Saarlouis) and his wife, the writer Anna Nütten, née Startz (b. 1861 in Aachen), daughter of the Kommerzienrat Conrad Alexander Startz, in Düsseldorf and from 1895 in Kleve, where her father, then a retired colonel. D., had acquired as a summer residence the Villa Elsa, built from 1884 onwards, a stately home at Bergstraße 16 with a garden designed by Maximilian Friedrich Weyhe. In the 1900s, she briefly took private lessons with the painter Carl Murdfield. Around 1906, she married Albert Baur, a history and landscape painter of the Düsseldorf school. On 3 June 1909, their daughter Ruth was born in Düsseldorf, who later made a name for herself as a ballet mistress in Kleve under her married name "Countess von Bullion".

In the 1920s, she resumed her "innate profession" as a painter and created landscapes, architectural views, sacred paintings (such as Stations of the Cross) and portraits. She also worked as a wood and linocutter and as a dancer. In Kleve, where she had settled after the death of her parents and with the exception of the years 1940 to 1943, when she stayed in Rome and Anticoli Corrado, lived and worked, however, she was perceived less as an artist than as a dazzling personality with a resolute demeanour, which earned her the nickname "Generalin" there. Walther Brüx, chairman of the Niederrheinischer Künstlerbund, of which she was a member, described her at the opening of an exhibition of her work, organised for her ninetieth birthday in the B.C. Koekkoek-Haus, with the words: "She is the only man among the artists of Kleve."

Baur-Nütten died in Kleve at the age of 95.
