= Clara von Wille =

German animal painter

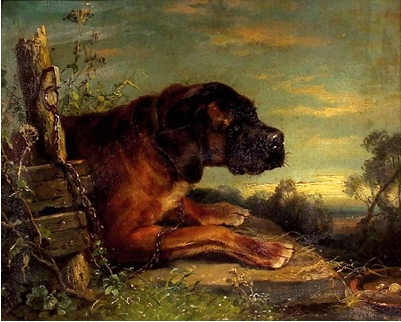
The Lonely Watchdog (1882)

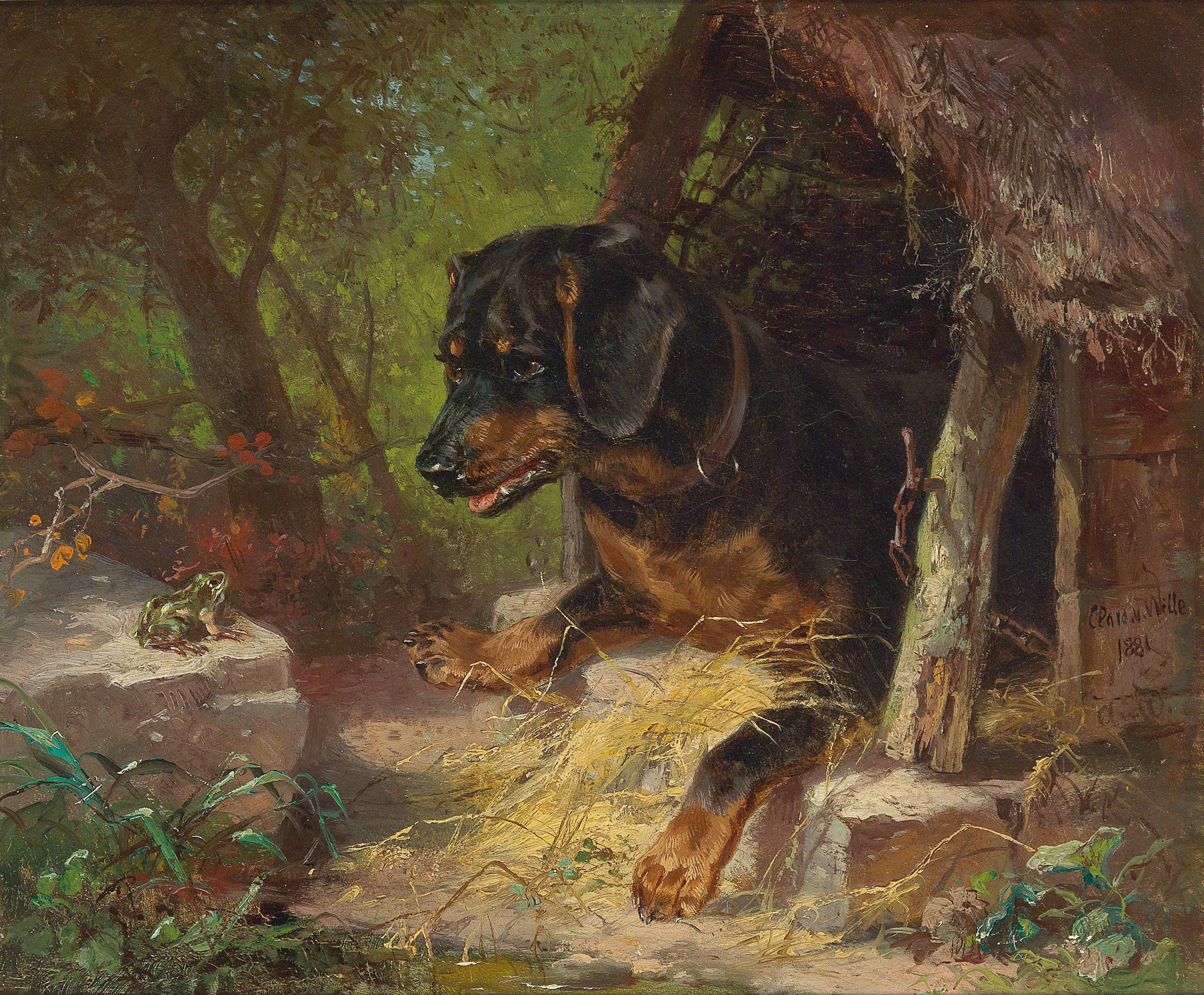
The Frog (1881)

Clara von Wille, née Clara Maria Alexandra von Böttcher (1838 – 15 March 1883) was a German animal painter; associated with the Düsseldorf School.

== Life and work ==
She was born in Düsseldorf. She was the youngest of four daughters born to the Royal Prussian Hussar, Major Carl Friedrich von Böttcher (1785–1857), and his wife Juliane Wilhelmine Charlotte von Buggenhagen (1797–1871). In 1859, she married the landscape and genre painter, August von Wille. Their son, Fritz, also became a well known landscape painter.

She was a private student of Karl Ferdinand Sohn and Ludwig Knaus. Later, she studied with the famous French animal painter, Rosa Bonheur.

Her first exhibited painting was "Resting Hunting Dogs", shown at the Kunstverein für die Rheinlande und Westfalen in 1857. Later, her works were regularly displayed at the Eduard Schulte Galleries and at Bismeyer & Kraus. Several of her works were purchased for a lottery, conducted by the Zentral-Dombau-Verein zu Köln, to raise money for completing the construction of Cologne Cathedral. Many of her most popular paintings were reproduced in illustrated magazines and as wood engravings.

Wille died in 1883, in Düsseldorf.
