= August von Wille =

German painter

August Levin von Wille (18 April 1828 – 31 March 1887) was a German landscape painter, genre artist and illustrator.

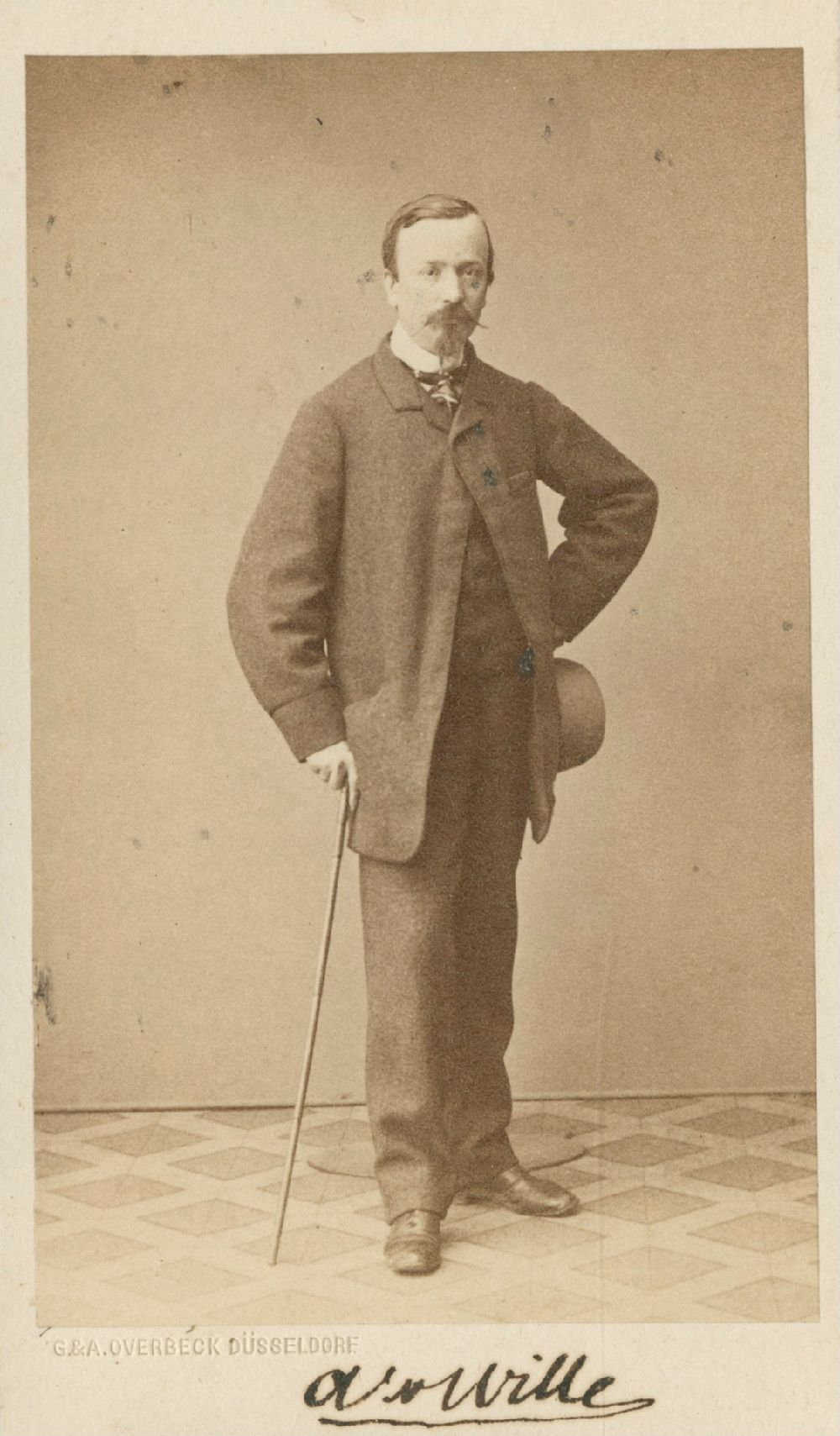
August von Wille by G. & A. Overbeck (firm), c. 1868

== Life and work ==
He was born in Kassel. He came from a family that had been raised to the nobility in 1780, and his father was a member of the Governing Council of the Electorate of Hesse. From 1843 to 1847, he studied at the Kunsthochschule Kassel, then joined the landscape painting class of Johann Wilhelm Schirmer at the Kunstakademie Düsseldorf which, with a short break for military service, he attended until 1854. From 1849, he was a member of the Düsseldorf artists' society Malkasten (Paintbox). Some of his earliest known works were, effectively, political cartoons made during the revolutions of 1848/49.

He was called to teach at the newly established Weimar Saxon-Grand Ducal Art School by Grand Duke Charles Alexander himself, and lived there from 1859 to 1863, when he returned to Düsseldorf with his family. He travelled extensively to paint, however, visiting Thuringia, the Mittelrhein and Mosel, painting mostly in plein air. He also painted architectural and urban motifs, including winding streets and monastery ruins. Always loyal to what he had learned from Schirmer, he did move away from detailed realism and came under the influence of the Romantic artist Caspar Scheuren, which can be seen in his fantastical forest scenes.

His wife was the animal painter, Clara von Böttcher, and their son was the landscape painter Fritz von Wille.

== Selected works ==
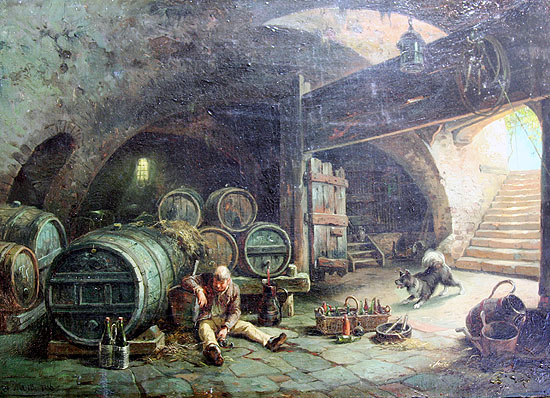
In a Wine Cellar (1886)

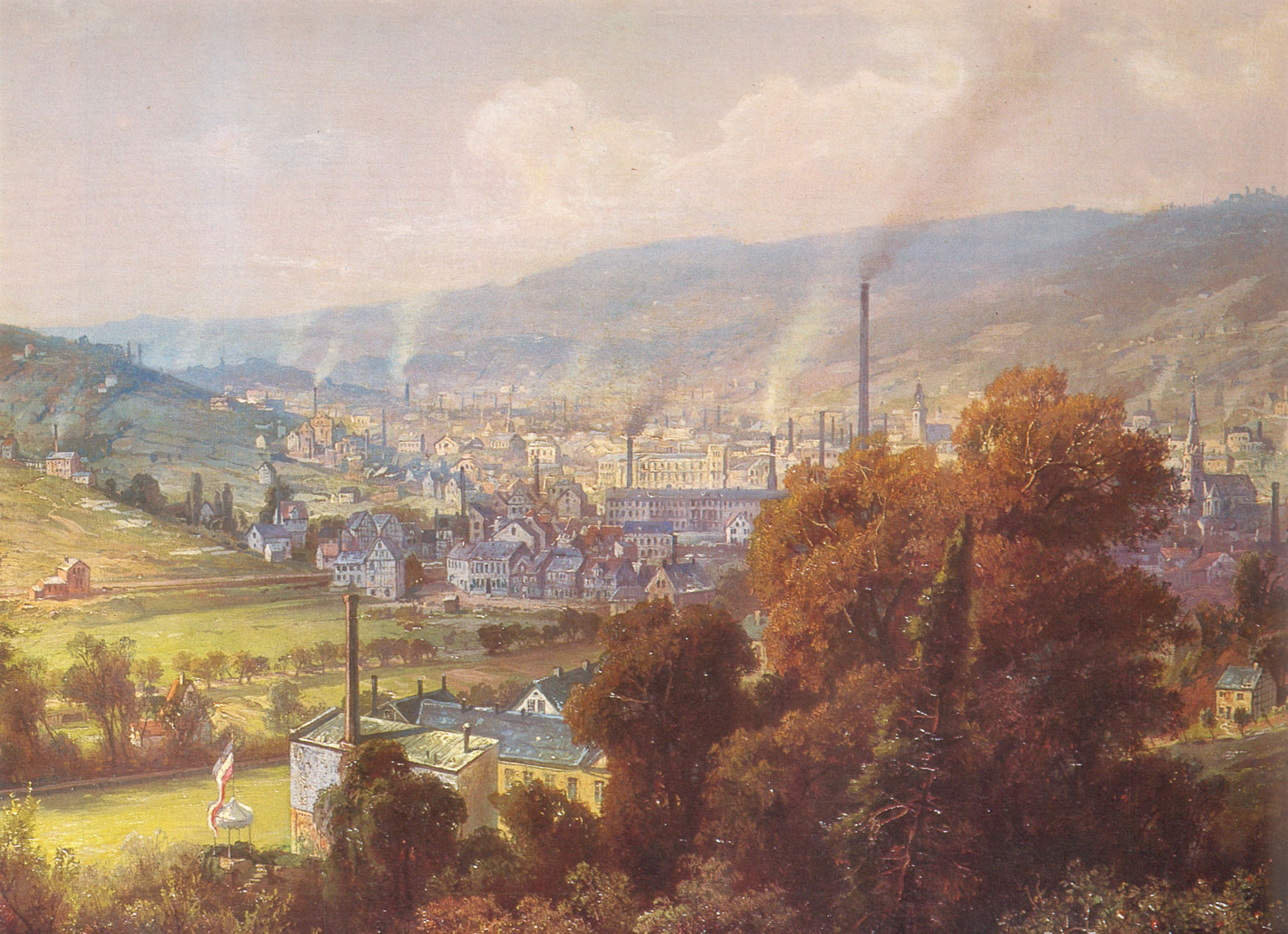
Barmen, seen from the Ehrenberg (1870)

Burning of the Düsseldorfer Schloss (1872)

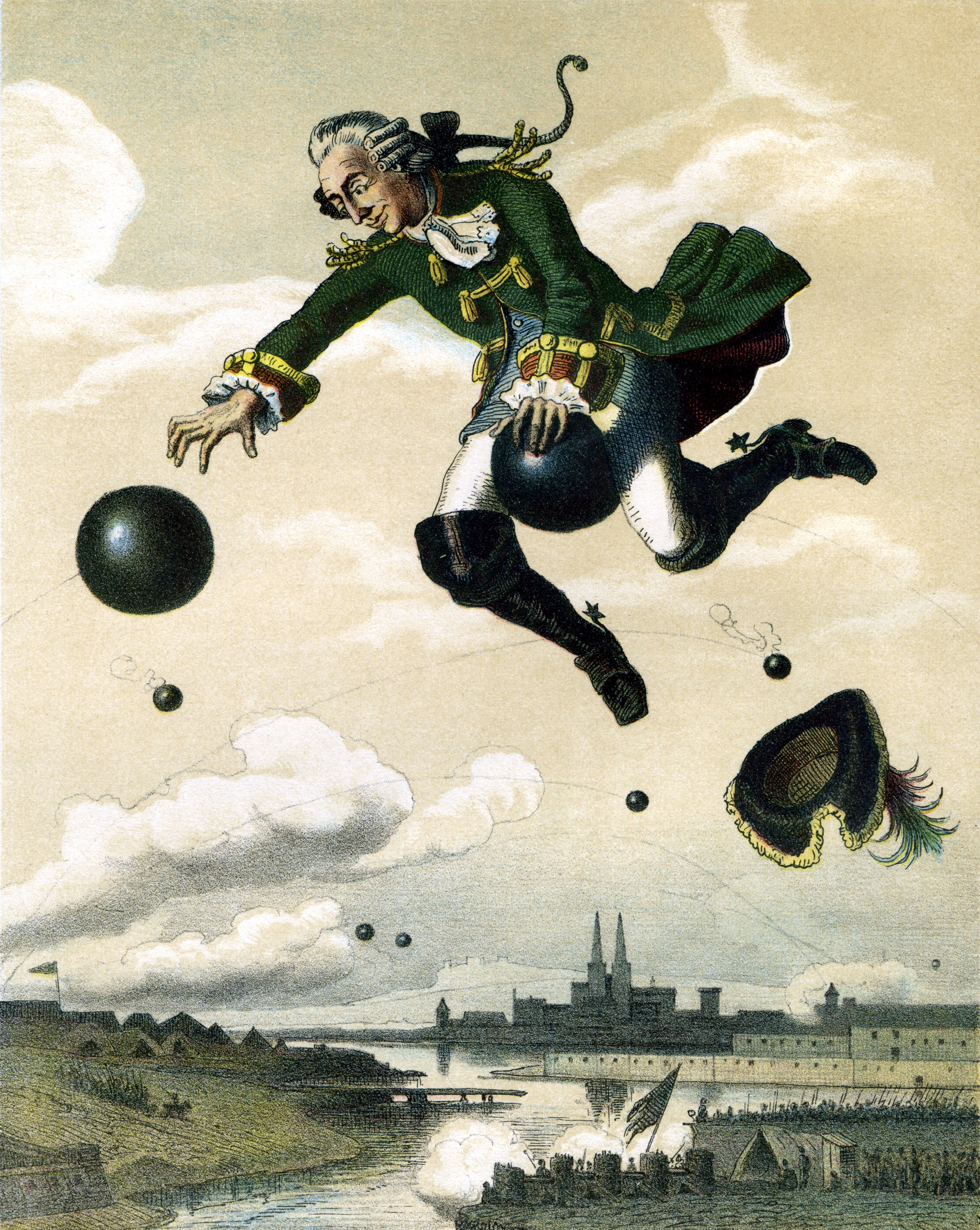
Baron Munchausen rides a cannonball (pre-1872)

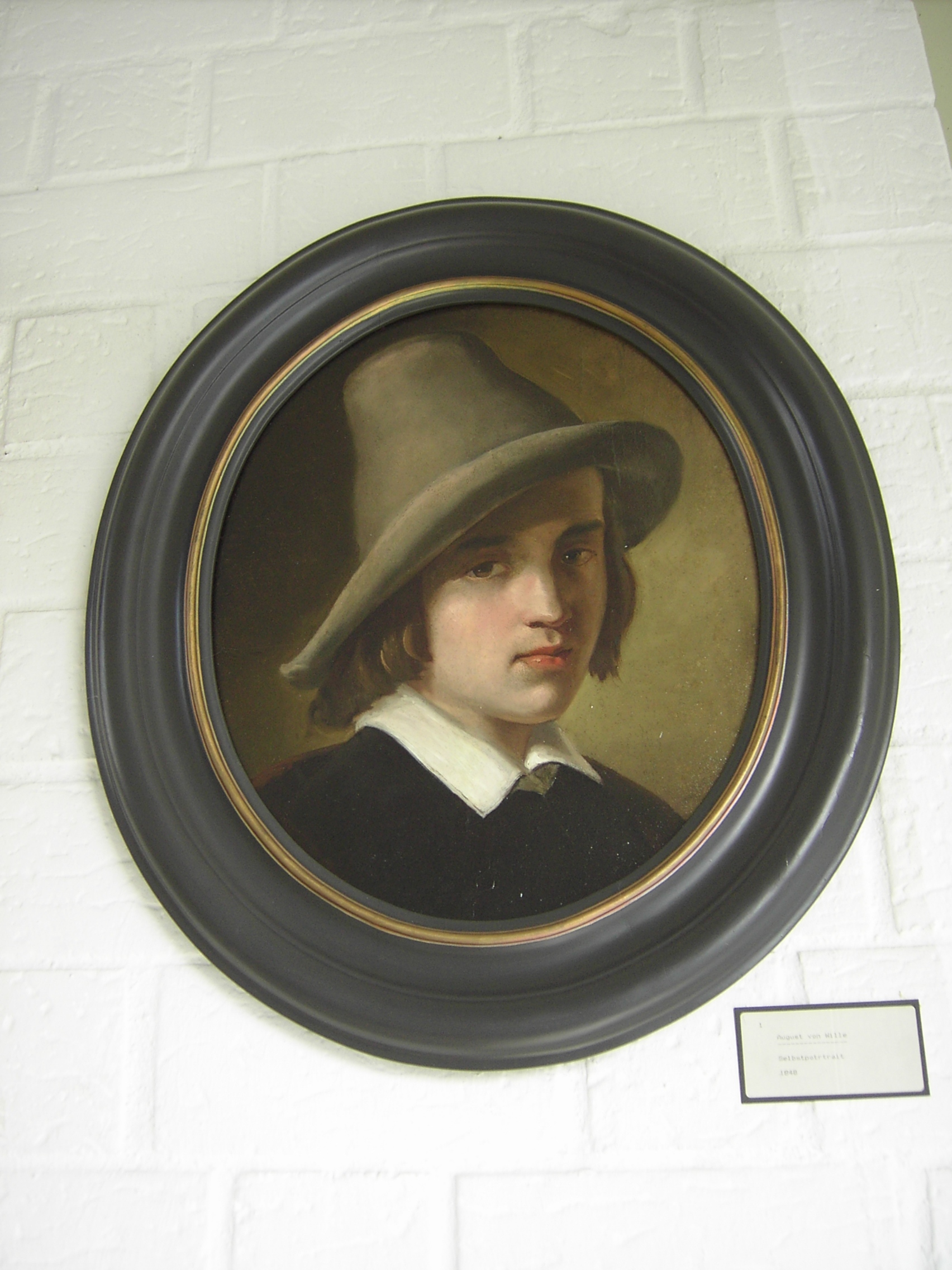
Self-portrait (1848) at the Fritz von Wille Museum, Bitburg

== Selected illustrations ==
Digitalized by the University and State Library Düsseldorf. The complete collection may be found in the corresponding article on German Wikipedia.

- Gottfried August Bürger: Baron Münchhausen's only true adventures at sea and on land, on horseback and on foot, in war and peace, in the air as well as in several corners of the world, newly written by Himself and provided with very whimsical drawings from nature recorded by the painter A. von Wille. - Düsseldorf : Arnz, 1856.
- Albert Wolff: Schultze and Müller in the Orient : humorous images of war - Düsseldorf : Arnz, 1854.
