= Fred Kocks =

German painter

Fred Kocks (24 January 1905 – 1989) in Düsseldorf was a German landscape and figure painter, draughtsman and lithographer as well as curator, museum director and author.

== Life ==
Born in Ulm, Kocks studied painting with the Düsseldorf landscape painter Helmuth Liesegang. Study trips took him to the Netherlands, Belgium, France and Italy. As a line-loyal member of the Nazi Party as well as protégé, "text designer and artistic collaborator" of the Düsseldorf Gauleiter Friedrich Karl Florian, he made a career in the Düsseldorf cultural administration in the 1930s. He quickly rose to become curator of the Museum Kunstpalast and director of the Alte Kunsthalle. There, he organised in particular the seasonal exhibitions of Düsseldorf artists.

At the same time, he continued to be active as a painter. With the oil painting Sommeridyll am Bach he was represented at the Große Deutsche Kunstausstellung in the Haus der Kunst in Munich in 1942. In 1943 he presented his painting Am Schloßweiher there. In 1944 he was among selected representatives of Art in Nazi Germany at the exhibition Deutsche Künstler und die SS in Breslau.

After the death of the art historian Hans Wilhelm Hupp in 1943, he was given the provisional management of the municipal art collections. As such, he organised the exhibition D' Arte contemporanea di Duesseldorf, which took place in 1943 in the Palazzo Strozzi in Florence. His transfer to another office within the Düsseldorf administration took place in 1945 at the instigation of the British military government. In 1953, against the opposition of the art historian Werner Doede who had taken over the management of the municipal art collection in 1949 and thwarted an attempt to reassign Kocks in 1949, he was reinstated as its curator. Kocks held this post until 1964.

Together with the landscape painters Albert Henrich, Willy Reetz, August Rixen and Fritz Köhler, with whose family there were close ties, Kocks was one of the founders of the Düsseldorfer Künstlergruppe 1949.

== Publications ==
- with Friedrich Karl Florian, Adolf Hitler and Konstantin von Neurath: Düsseldorfer Kunstmappe 1940. Völkischer Verlag, Düsseldorf 1940.
- Kunstausstellung für deutsche Soldaten. Zeitgenössische Künstler stellen aus. Nationalsozialistische Gemeinschaft Kraft durch Freude, Verlag Schwann, Düsseldorf 1941.
- Ausstellung Düsseldorfer Künstler. Kulturamt der Stadt Karlsbad, Karlsbad 1942.
- Düsseldorfer Kunstausstellung. Der Rhein und das Reich. Herzog-Anton-Ulrich-Museum, Kunstverein Braunschweig, Braunschweig 1942.
- Helmuth Liesegang. Ein Düsseldorfer Meister der Gegenwart. Graf und Schumacher, Düsseldorf 1943.
- with Hermann Schardt, Dolf Siebert und Oskar Söhn: Westdeutsche Graphiker der Gegenwart. Graf und Schumacher, Düsseldorf 1944.
- Düsseldorfer Künstler der Gegenwart. Ausstellungskatalog innerhalb der großen Rationalisierungsausstellung „Alle sollen besser leben“, Nordwestdeutsche Ausstellungs-Gesellschaft, Kunstmuseum Ehrenhof, Düsseldorf 1953.
- Düsseldorfer Maler und Bildhauer der letzten 50 Jahre. Kunstverein für die Rheinlande und Westfalen, Düsseldorf 1965.
- Über Kunst und Künstler in Düsseldorf. In Fünfzehn Maler der Düsseldorfer Schule. Ausstellungskatalog, HP Galerie Velbert-Langenberg, 1976.
