= Hans Wilhelm Hupp =

German art historian, author and curator

Hans Wilhelm Hupp (1896–1943) was a German art historian, author and curator. From 1933 to 1943 he directed the Museum Kunstpalast of the city of Düsseldorf.

== Life ==
In 1919, Hupp received his doctorate in Bonn with the dissertation Entwicklungsgeschichte der Kunst Carl Friedrich Lessing. In 1922 he published it under the title Karl Friedrich Lessing, a transitional master of the Düsseldorf school of painting from Romanticism to Realism. As early as 1916, he had appeared in the cultural magazine Die Rheinlande with the article Zum Problem des modernen Kirchenbaues, im besonderen des katholischen. In it, he had advocated overcoming the sacral style and a contemporary renewal of church architecture.

In 1925, Hupp entered the service of the Wallraf-Richartz-Museum & Fondation Corboud in Cologne, first as a volunteer, then as a research assistant. When the position of director of the 17th to 20th century gallery was vacant there in 1928, he held it on an interim basis. On 1 March 1934, Hupp succeeded Karl Koetschau as full-time director of the Kunstmuseum Düsseldorf, he had already held it provisionally since 1933.

As Düsseldorf museum director, he opened the exhibition "Galerie der Neuzeit" on 17 July 1935, a compilation of 20th-century paintings and sculptures whose concept he had been working on since 1934. Under pressure from the Nazis, this exhibition, whose location they defamed as a "chamber of horrors of art", to be closed just one day after its opening. In the summer of 1935, the mayor of Düsseldorf Hans Wagenführ decided to focus the collection entirely on regional art. The "Gallery of Modern Art" was thus de facto at an end; from 1937 it was officially called the "Rhenish-Westphalian Gallery". In 1935, the first modern works were given away: In September, a painting by Paul Klee was exchanged for a drawing by Wilhelm Leibl. Works by KünstlerSammelwerkn such as Emil Nolde, Max Pechstein or Otto Dix were also sold. The confiscation action "Degenerate Art" followed. This effectively dissolved the "Gallery of Modern Art" in 1937. 112 paintings, eleven sculptures and 929 works on paper were lost as a result of these actions.

== Publications ==
- Zum Problem des modernen Kirchenbaus, im besonderen des katholischen. In Die Rheinlande, Jahrgang 1916, Heft 9, pp. 312 ff. (Numerized).
- Entwicklungsgeschichte der Kunst Carl Friedrich Lessing. Dissertation (Maschinenschrift), Bonn 1919.
- Große Kunstausstellung Düsseldorf 1920. In Die Kunst und das schöne Heim, fascicule 23/24, 1920, pp. 431 f. (Numerized).
- Karl Friedrich Lessing, ein Übergangsmeister der Düsseldorfer Schule von der Romantik zum Realismus. Bonn 1922.
- Die Belagerung von C. F. Lessing. In Pempelfort. Sammlung kleiner Düsseldorfer Kunstschriften, fascicule 3, Schwann, Düsseldorf 1925.
- Vlämische und holländische Landschaftsmalerei im Wallraf-Richartz-Museum. Kölner Verlagsanstalt, Cologne 1927.
- with Otto H. Förster: Vergessene Bilder des Wallraf-Richartz-Museums. Kölner Verlagsanstalt, Cologne 1928.
- Das Argusbild des Peter Paul Rubens in der Kölner Galerie. In Paul Clemen (ed.), Walter Cohen, Kurt Karl Eberlein, Gustav Lomnitz (redaction): Karl Koetschau – von seinen Freunden und Verehrern zum 60. Geburtstag am 27. März 1928. Düsseldorf 1928, pp. 118 ff.
- Düsseldorf: Ausstellung alter Kunst aus Rheinisch-Westfälischem Privatbesitz. In Pantheon, fascicule 1/2, 1928, pp. 106 f.
- Jubiläumsausstellung des Kunstvereins für die Rheinlande und Westfalen. Alte Malerei aus Privatbesitz. In Pantheon, fascicule 3/4, 1929, pp. 339 f.
- Ausstellung der Sammlung Wolff-Ebenrod im Kunst- und Museumsverein Wuppertal. In Pantheon, fascicule 3/4, 1929, pp. 382 ff.
- Museumsberichte. Kunstsammlungen der Stadt Düsseldorf. In Wallraf-Richartz-Jahrbuch, 1936, pp. 245 ff.
- with Horst Ebel (Kulturdezernent der Stadt Düsseldorf): Drei Jahre Museumsarbeit in Düsseldorf. 1934–1936. Bagel, Düsseldorf 1937.
- Ein unbekanntes Frühwerk von Cornelius. In Wallraf-Richartz-Jahrbuch, 1938, S. 254 ff.
- Museumsberichte vom 1. April 1938 bis 31. März 1939. Kunstsammlungen der Stadt Düsseldorf. In Wallraf-Richartz-Jahrbuch, 1939, pp. 304 ff.
- Holländische Landschaftsmalerei im Wallraf-Richartz-Museum. Prestel, Cologne 1940.778
