= Hermann Carl Hempel =

German landscape painter (1848–1921)

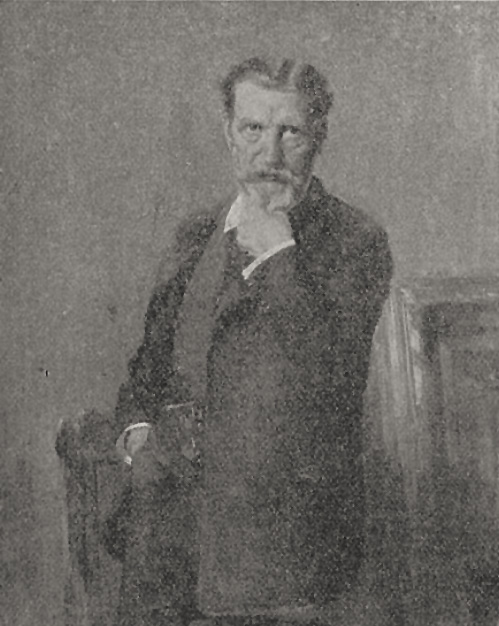
Hermann Carl Hempel, painting by Wilhelm Schneider-Didam, 1907

Hermann Carl Hempel (13 April 1848 – 26 September 1921) was a German landscape painter and illustrator of the Düsseldorf school of painting and director of the Kunsthalle Düsseldorf.

== Life ==
Born in Stralsund, Hempel studied painting at the Düsseldorf Art Academy. There Andreas Müller was his teacher. He also took lessons with the landscape painter Eugen Dücker. Hempel was a member of the artists' associations Malkasten, Laetitia and Orient. On 13 February 1875, he starred on the Malkasten stage in the farce Das Ständchen. In 1877, he married Adele, the daughter of the Düsseldorf landscape painter Friedrich Heunert. The couple had two children, Friedrich, who became a concert organist, and Klara. From 1883 to 1920 Hempel was director and managing director of the Kunsthalle Düsseldorf. In 1900 and 1902 Hempel stayed in Katwijk.

Hempel died in Düsseldorf at the age of 73.

== Work ==
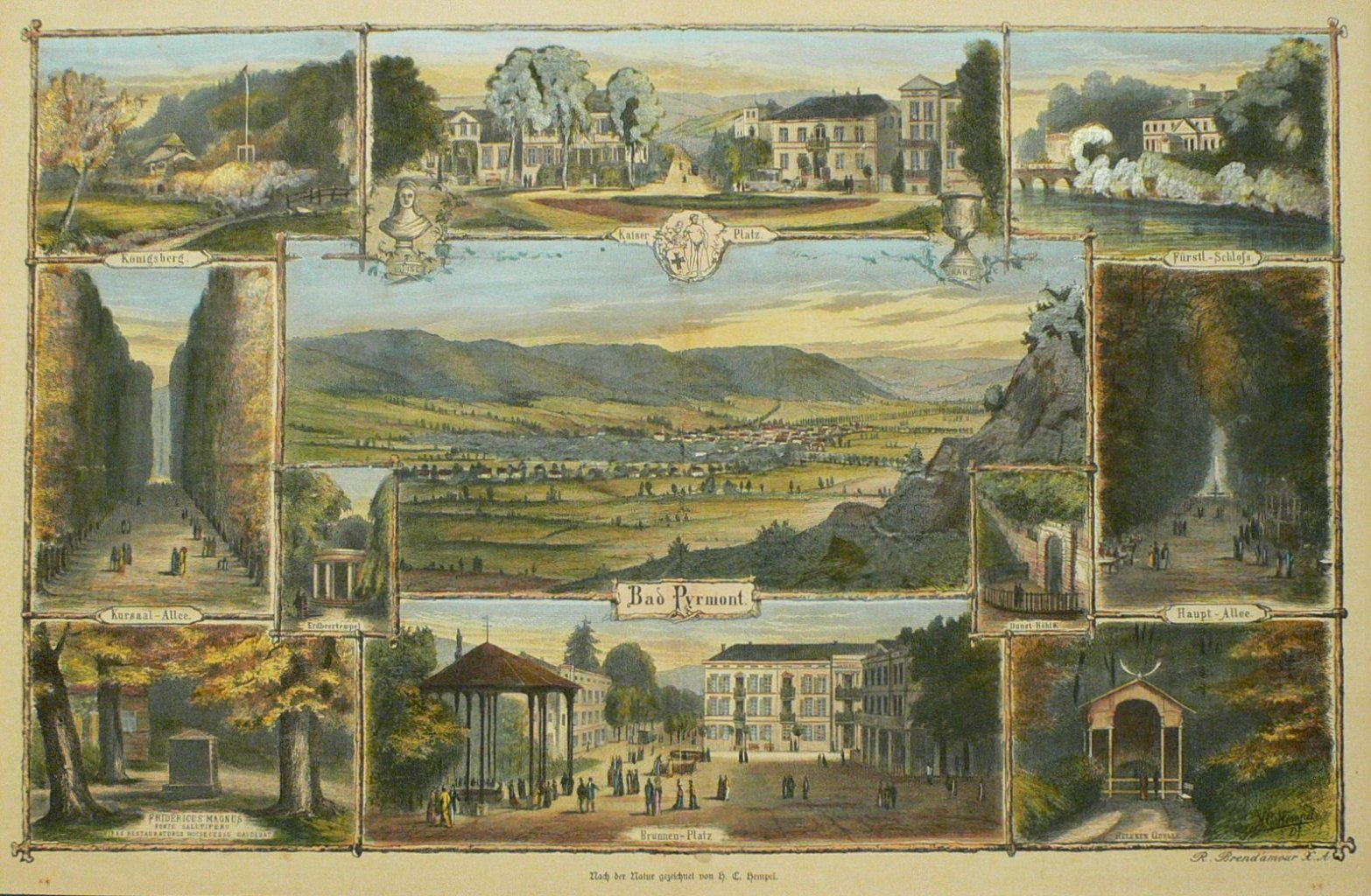
Bad Pyrmont – Souvenirblatt, 1881, wood engraving by Richard Brend'amour after an original by Hermann Carl Hempel

- Templates for Bad Pyrmont – Souvenirblatt, coloured wood engravings by Richard Brend'amour, 1881
- Wassermühle
- Teilansicht von Moselkern
- Aprilstimmung
- Eifellandschaft mit Gehöft
- Herbstliche Waldstimmung mit Weitblick
- Impressionistische Landschaft
