= Carl Adloff =

German painter (1819–1863)

Carl (Karl) Adloff (12 January 1819 – 16 April 1863) was a German painter of the Düsseldorf school of painting.

== Life ==
Born in Düsseldorf, Adloff was the child of Franz Joseph Adloff (1786–1832) and Anna Margaretha Adloff, née Kaimer (1784–1846). From 1833 to 1843, he studied at the Kunstakademie Düsseldorf, where in 1836 he took the class of Landschaftsmaler under Johann Wilhelm Schirmer. and attended the architecture class under Rudolf Wiegmann in 1840/1841. In the student lists of the Meisterklasse, he was listed as an architectural and landscape painter from 1840 to 1843. In his choice of motifs, he favoured – following the Dutch Golden Age painting – the Dutch landscape; he created beach, harbour, canal and city views, whose architecture he captured in detail and in a fine painting style. He often painted seascapes, which are bathed in a romantic mood of tranquillity by moonlight, morning and evening light. He was repeatedly represented at academic art exhibitions in Germany and abroad. Adloff was a member of the Malkasten.

Adloff married Adelheid Schmitz (1820–1893), who gave birth to his daughter Sybilla Carolina in 1850. They lived at Pfannenschoppenstraße 239 (today Klosterstraße in Düsseldorf-Stadtmitte) – in the house where Alwine and Adolph Schroedter had lived before they went to Karlsruhe. Sybilla Carolina became the wife of the animal painter Carl Jutz in 1868. and 1873 mother of the later landscape painter Carl Ernst Bernhard Jutz.

Adloff died in Düsseldorf at the age of 44 and was buried at Golzheimer Friedhof (southern part).

== Work ==
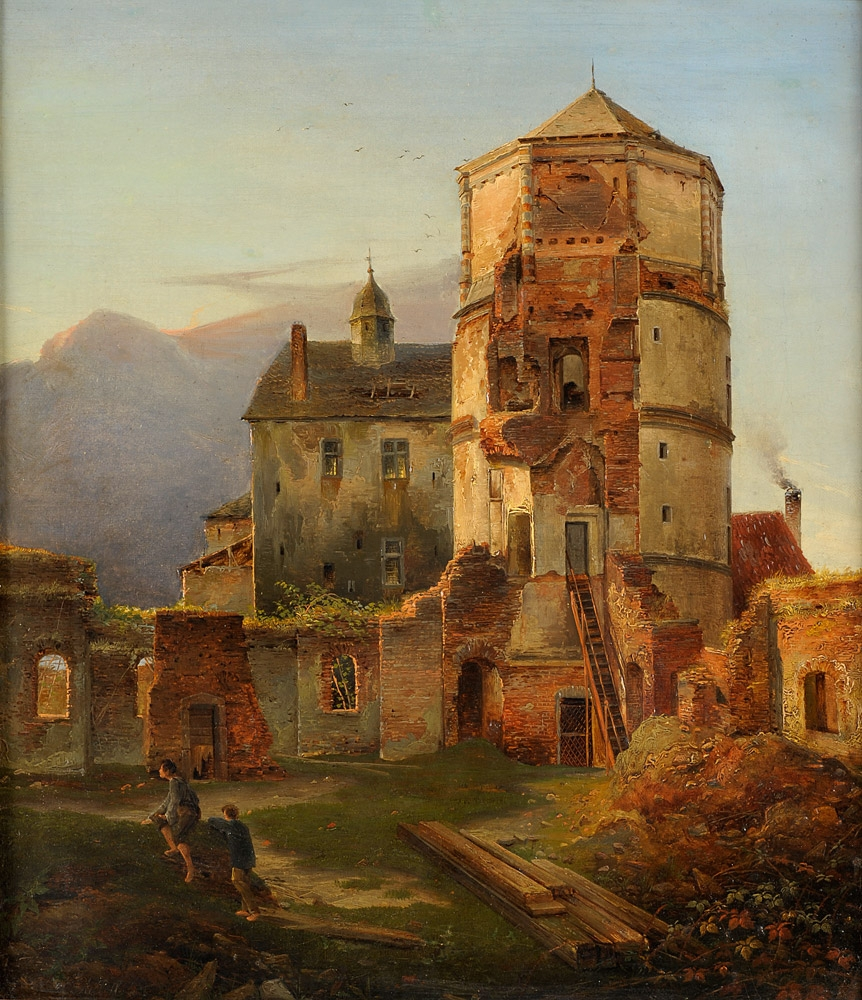
Burgruine, the Schlossturm Düsseldorf, ca. 1840

- Burgruine, ca. 1840
- Holländischer Kanal, 1841
- Hafenpartie bei Amsterdam, 1846
- Winteransicht von Dordrecht, 1849
- Landungsplatz in Dordrecht, 1851
- Ansicht von Ehrenbreitstein und Koblenz, 1854
- Seehafen im Sonnenlicht, 1857
- Morgen an der Zuiderzee, 1861, Museum Kunstpalast
- Fluss, mit Booten und Schiffen, 1861
