= Coastal landscape (Fishermen going home) =

1841 painting by Eugen Dücker

- Rannamaastik (Kalurite kojuminek) (Estonian)
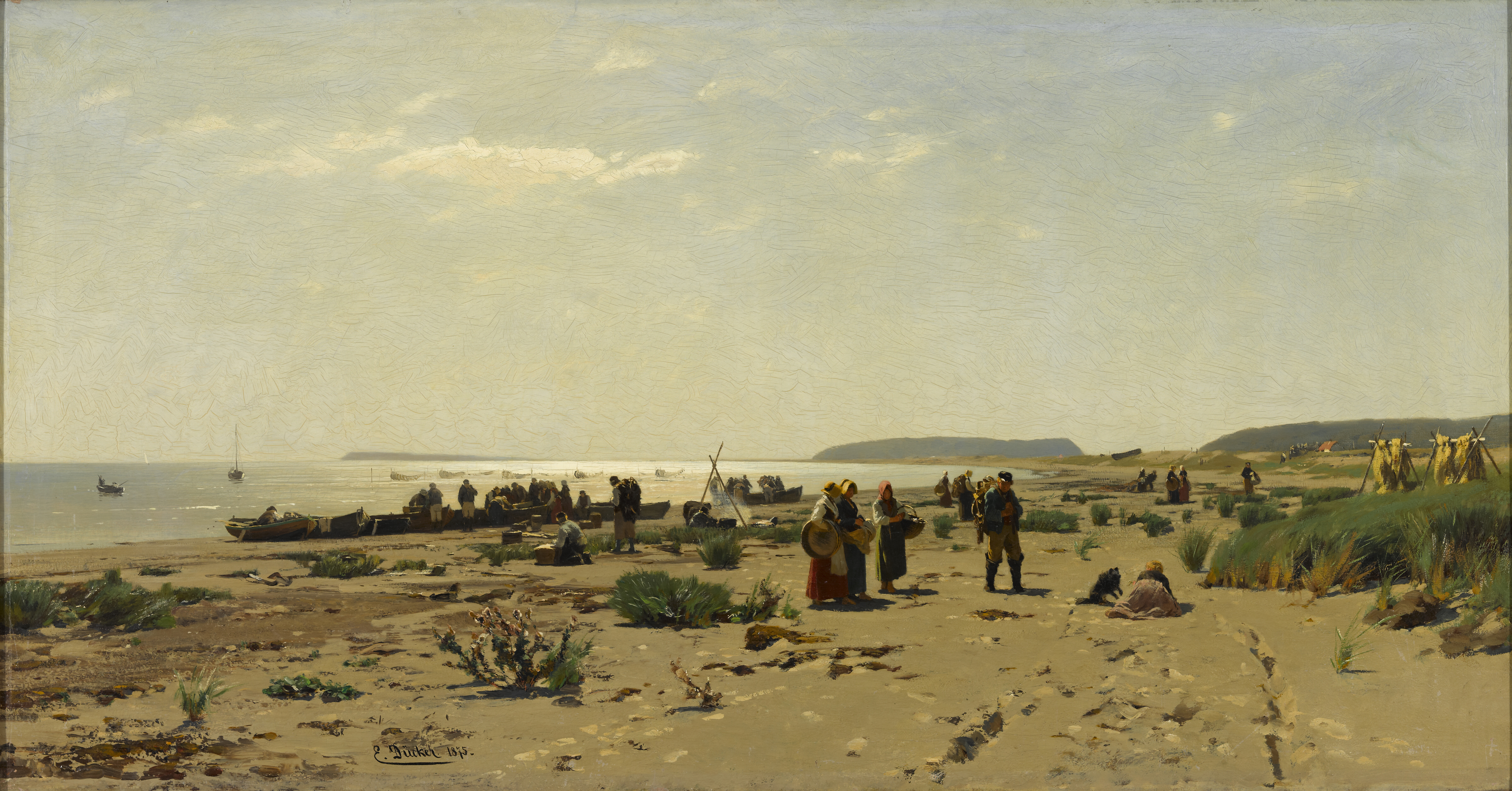
- Artist: Eugen Dücker
- Medium: oil on canvas
- Dimensions: 61 cm × 117.7 cm (24 in × 46.3 in)
- Location: Estonian Art Museum; Tallinn

Coastal landscape (Fishermen going home) (Estonian: Rannamaastik (Kalurite kojuminek)) is an oil painting by Eugen Dücker.

== Description ==
The painting's size is 61 x 117.7 cm. It is in the collection of the Eesti Kunstimuuseum.

== Analysis ==
The painting shows fishermen with their boats on the beach taking their catch home.
