= Kurt Karl Eberlein =

German art historian

Kurt Karl Eberlein ( 15 August 1890 in Rastatt – 1944/1945 on the Eastern Front?) was a German art historian who was close to the Nazi ideology.

== Career ==
Eberlein studied art history, archaeology, Egyptology and literature in Heidelberg, Munich and Bonn from 1908. From 1910, he continued his studies at the University of Halle with Adolph Goldschmidt, whom he followed in 1912 to the Humboldt University of Berlin. In 1916, during his war service, he was awarded a promotion under Goldschmidt.

In 1919, Eberlein became a research assistant at the Staatliche Kunsthalle Karlsruhe. In 1923, he contributed to a Festschrift for Adolph Goldschmidt's 60th birthday. In the autumn of 1925, he moved as a consultant for German craft culture to Reichskunstwart Edwin Redslob in Berlin. On 1 November 1929, he wrote an obituary for Aby Warburg for the Berliner Tageblatt.

== Work ==
In 1933, Eberlein wrote the paper Was ist deutsch in der deutschen Kunst, in which he led his fight "against everything anational, anti-national, international in German art". With recourse to Herder, Goethe, Fichte and Spengler, he also took sides with National Socialism and propagates a new German art beyond Expressionism. Kurt Karl Eberlein spricht [...] von der typisch deutschen "Schreckkunst", die er der romantisch geprägten Schmuckkunst gegenüberstellt.“ At the same time, he advocated a new type of art historian: "The art historian is not a specialist but a national personality, a seer, interpreter and translator at the same time, not a connoisseur of the art market but a connoisseur of the art spirit, of national art and life values". Eberlein bekannte sich offensiv und radikal zu den Ideen des Nationalsozialismus.

From 1933 onwards, he worked as a freelance author and did not aspire to a museum career.

Among other things, Eberlein published on the Nazarene movement as well as German Romanticism and its main representative Caspar David Friedrich. In 1939, his book Caspar David Friedrich - Der Landschaftsmaler. Ein Volksbuch deutscher Kunst, in which he appropriated his painting for his völkisch art history.

During the Second World War, Eberlein wrote articles for the Leipzig Illustrirte Zeitung (Das Opfer. Zum Heldengedenktag, March 1943; Arno Breker, August 1944). In 1944/1945, Eberlein presumably disappeared on the Eastern Front.
