= Heinrich Petersen-Angeln =

German painter (1850–1906)

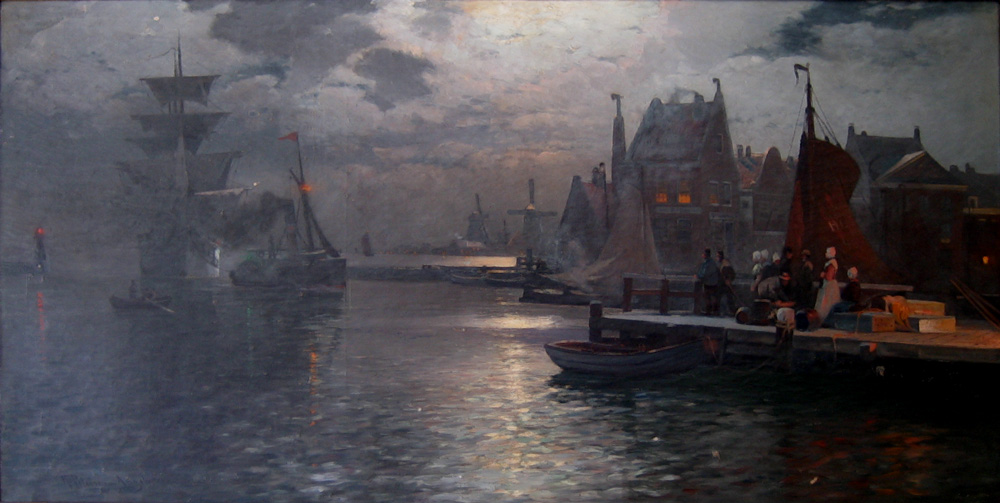
The Harbour of Harlingen in Moonlight

Heinrich Wilhelm Petersen, known as Heinrich Petersen-Angeln (4 April 1850 in Westerholz – 23 April 1906 in Angeln, Düsseldorf) was a German painter. He was a pupil of Eugen Dücker.
