= Georg Macco =

German landscape painter and illustrator

Georg Macco (23 March 1863 – 20 April 1933) was a German landscape painter and illustrator, associated with the Düsseldorfer Malerschule. He is primarily known for his Orientalist works.

== Biography ==
He was born in Aachen. He was inspired by stories of his great-great-uncle, the history and portrait painter Alexander Macco, who painted a portrait of the Queen of Prussia and was a close friend of Beethoven and Goethe. His artistic career began at the Kunstakademie Düsseldorf in 1880, where he studied with Eugen Dücker and Johann Peter Theodor Janssen until 1887. During this time, he also contributed illustrations to Die Gartenlaube and drawings of coats-of-arms for his brother, Hermann Friedrich Macco, who was a historian and genealogist.

He moved to Munich to further his studies and used that city as a base for his numerous travels. Later, he travelled throughout the Middle East, with the Orientalist works he produced as a result of these travels eventually becoming his most popular and sought after.

His works may be seen at the Kunstmuseum Düsseldorf, the Suermondt-Ludwig-Museum in Aachen and the Alpines Museum in Munich. Some of his works in Aachen were previously on the "Schattengalerie" (shadow gallery) list of works looted by the Nazis during World War II. Other works, not yet displayed, have been uncovered at the Simferopol Art Museum.

Macco died in 1933 in Genoa.

== Sources ==
- Benezit Dictionary of Artists, 1999, Vol.8, pg.910
- (in German) Georg Macco. In: Ulrich Thieme, Felix Becker (editors): Allgemeines Lexikon der Bildenden Künstler von der Antike bis zur Gegenwart. Band 23, E. A. Seemann, Leipzig 1929, S. 508.
- Albrecht Macco: Das Geschlecht Macco, Frühgeschichte, Löwensteiner Linie, Weikersheimer Linie, Kurzübersicht, Self-published, Cologne, 1940.
