= Fritz von Wille =

German painter (1860–1941)

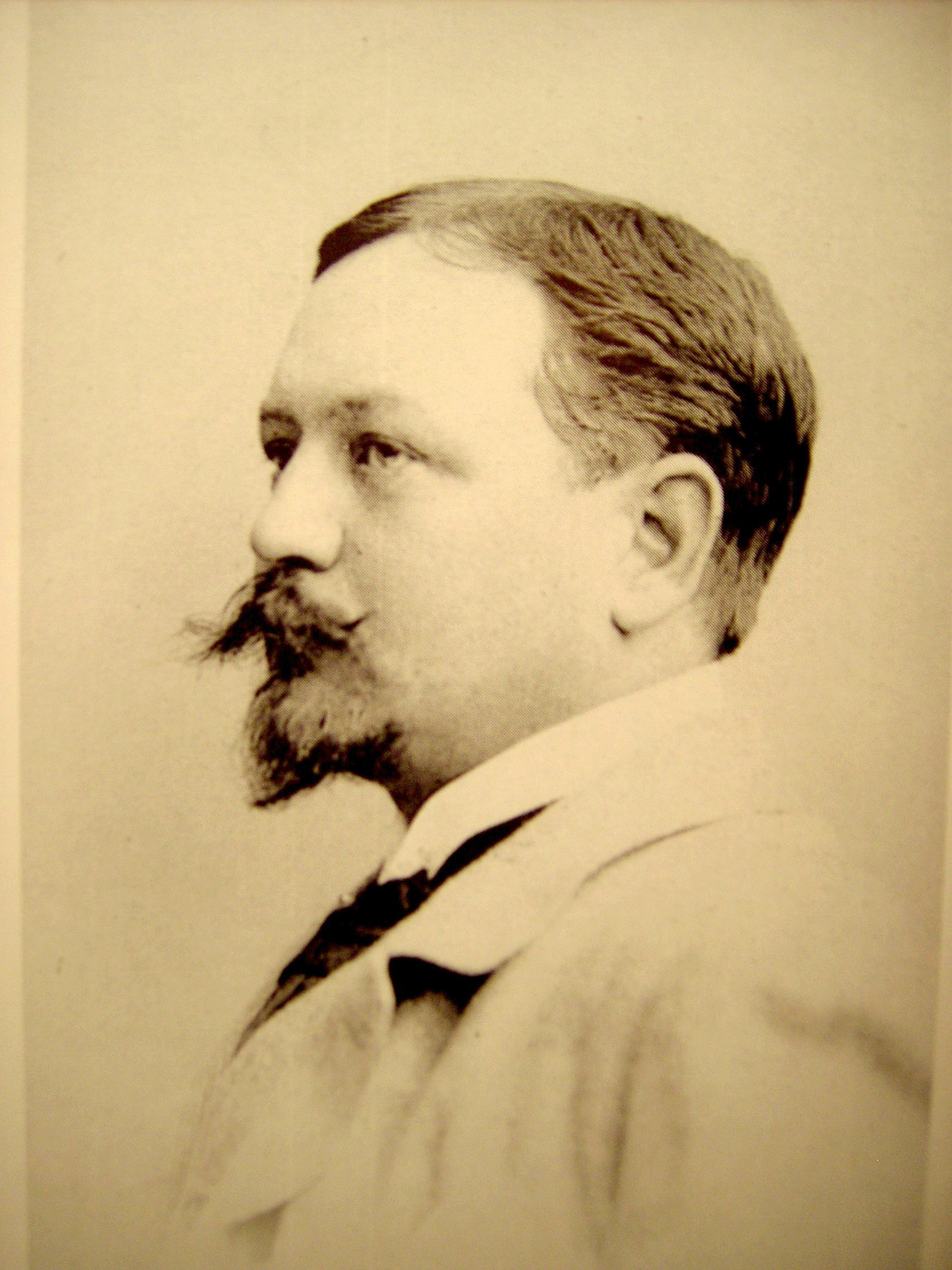
Fritz von Wille (1892)

Friedrich Gustav August Julius Philipp Rudolf von Wille, known as Fritz (21 April 1860, Weimar - 16 February 1941, Düsseldorf), was a German landscape painter and art professor; associated with the Düsseldorf School.

== Biography ==
He was born into a Hessian family that had been raised to the nobility in 1780. His father, August von Wille, and his mother Clara, were both painters. From 1879 to 1882, he attended the Kunstakademie Düsseldorf, where he initially studied with Andreas Müller and Heinrich Lauenstein, then took specialized courses from Peter Janssen. At first, he was heavily influenced by his father's works, and was concerned that the two would become confused; signing his paintings with "Jr.".

In the late 1880s, he made numerous trips throughout Germany. In 1885 and 1886, he visited the Italian Riviera. His experiences there led to a change in his approach to color, and he came under the influence of Eugen Dücker. In 1886, he also became a member of "Malkasten" (paint box), a progressive artists' association.

His works were generally created by making quick, impressionistic sketches from nature; then turning them into detailed compositions in his studio. His style was largely unaffected by the innovations of the following periods, although some small elements of Art Nouveau may be detected. He spent his summer months touring in Eifel.

In 1892, he married Auguste Schneider, the daughter of Otto Schneider, a tobacco merchant, and his wife Maria. They had two sons; Otto (1901-1977), who also became a painter, and Fritz Jr. (1903-1972). After 1899, he and his family had a second home in Eifel. He was given the title of Professor in 1910, but did no teaching. In 1911, he had become sufficiently successful to acquire Kerpen Castle, where he took up permanent residence. That same year, Kaiser Wilhelm II awarded him the Order of the Red Eagle. During World War I, he served as an "Offiziersstellvertreter" in Nivelles.

Following the war, his works declined in quality, and he made much of his living from reproducing earlier ones. During the runaway inflation of the 1920s, he lost most of his fortune. At the beginning of the 1930s, he made an attempt to adapt to changing tastes, but was only moderately successful. He died in his studio in 1941.

The largest collection of his works is held by the "Fritz-von-Wille-Museum", at the Beda House cultural center in Bitburg. Streets have been named after him in Düsseldorf, Trier and Kerpen.

Wille died on 16 February 1941 in his Düsseldorf studio.

== Selected paintings ==
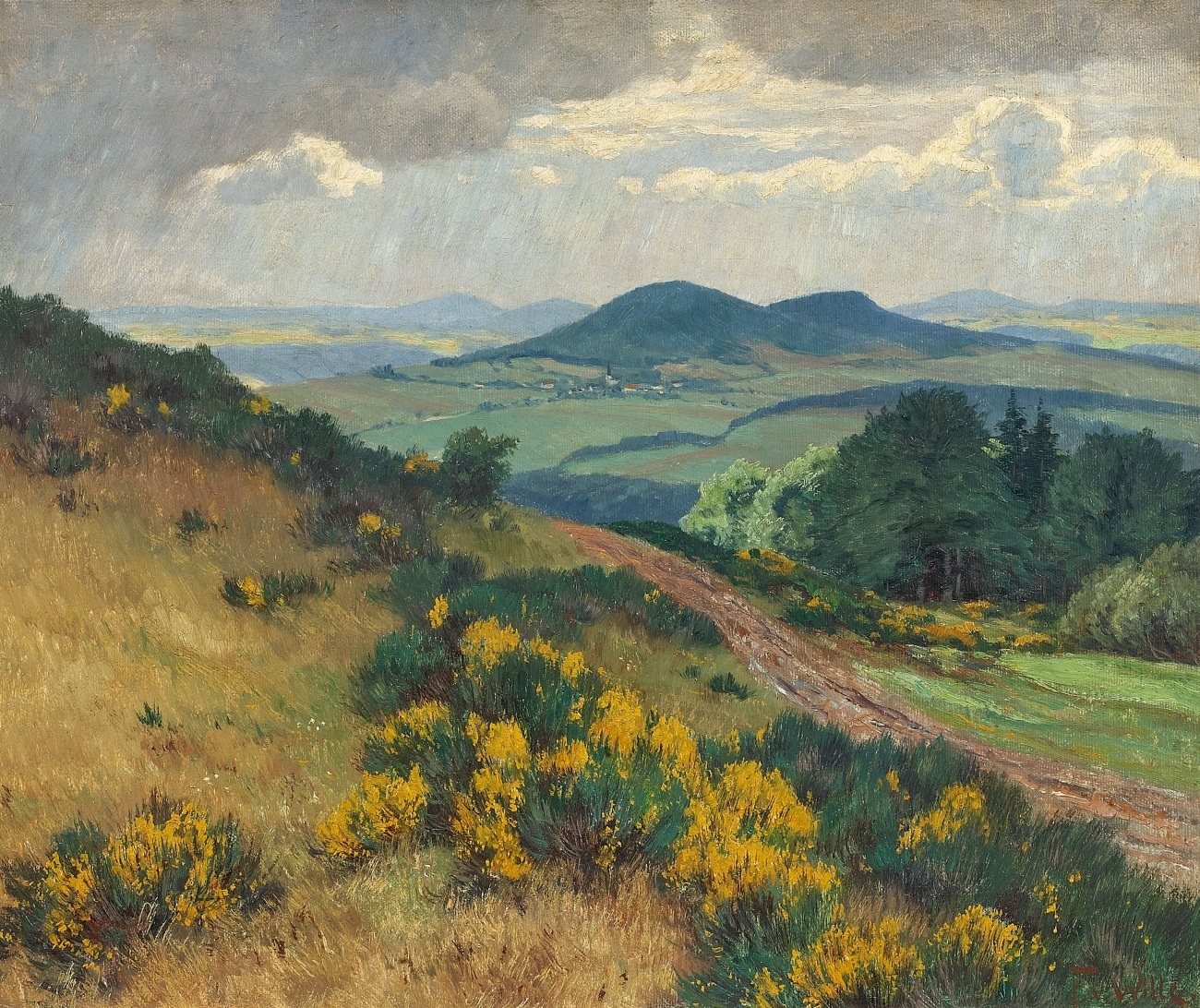
Eifel Landscape

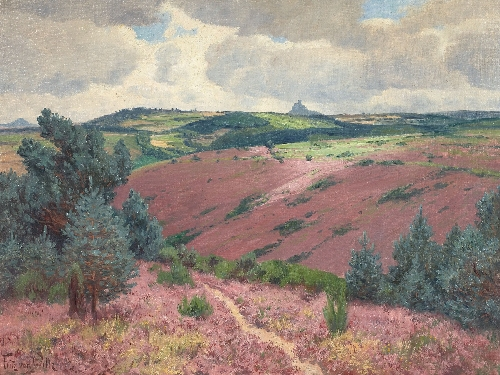
Eifel Landscape
with View of Nürburg

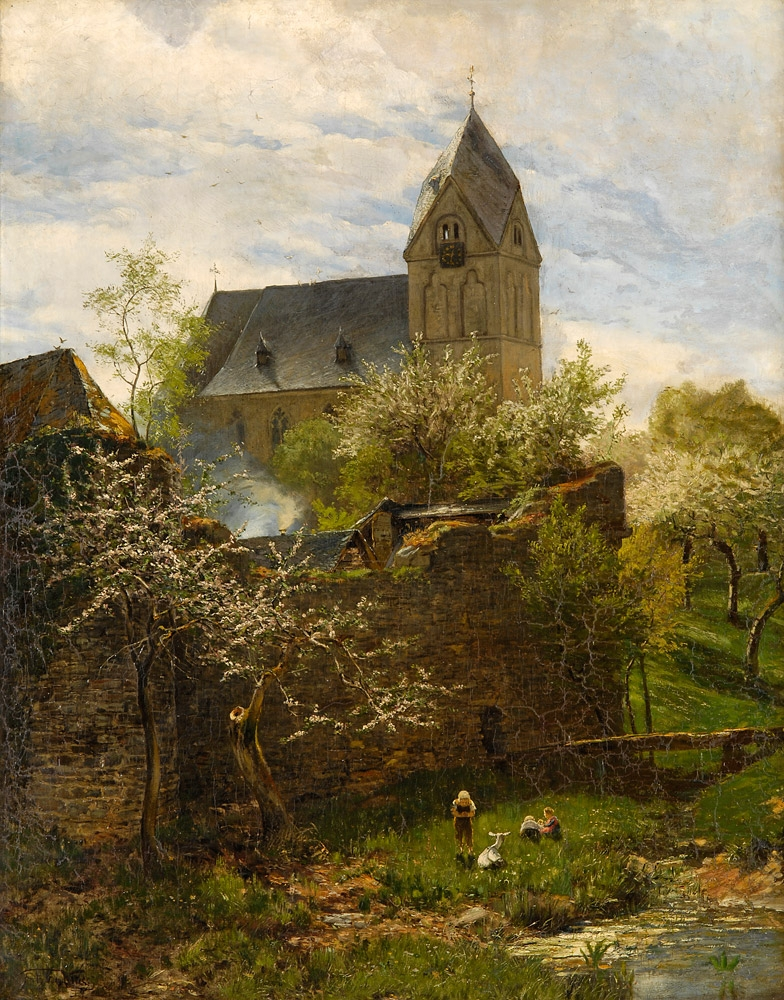
Spring in Eifel

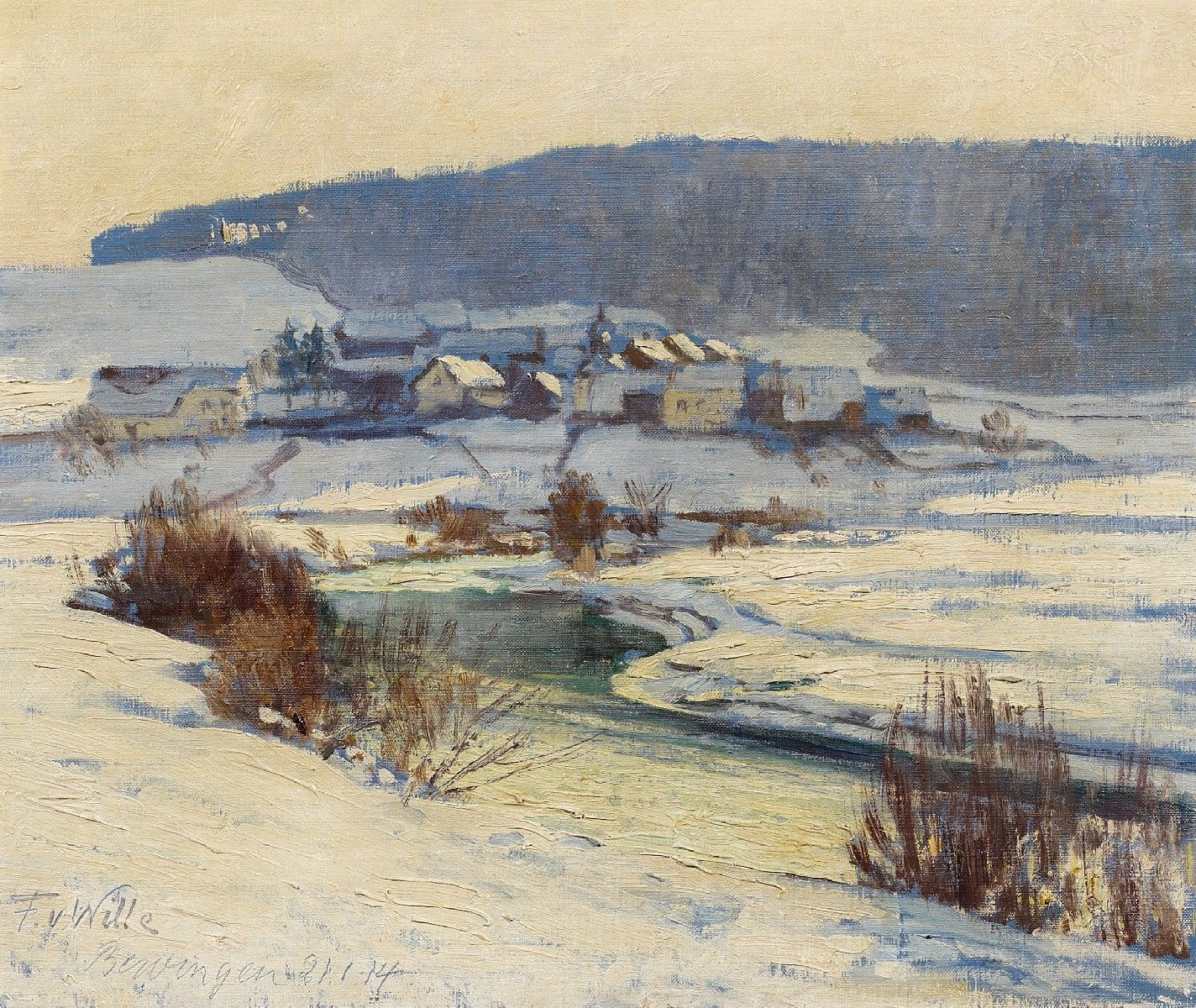
Winter in Bewingen

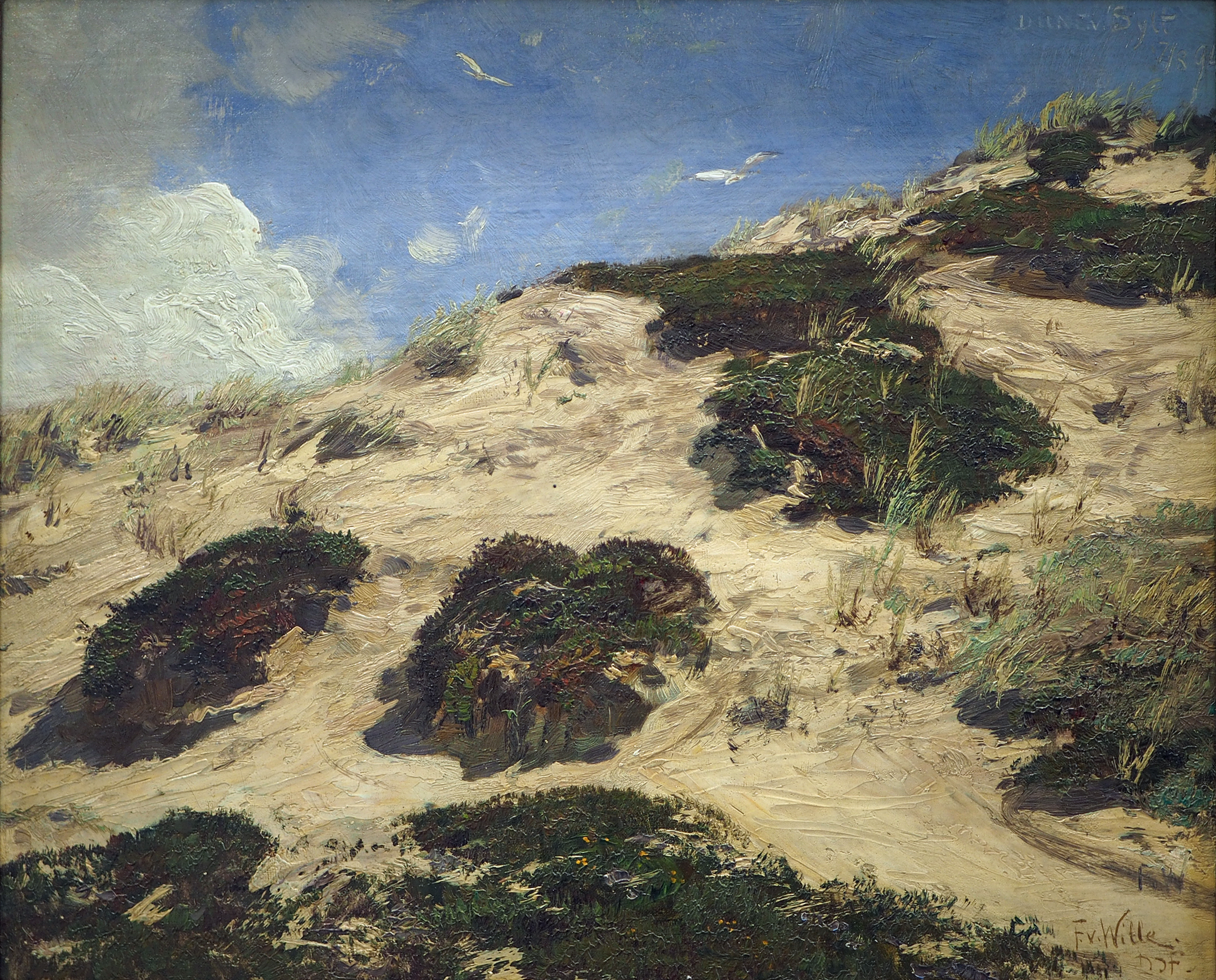
The Dunes at Sylt

== Sources ==
- Alfred Kirfel: "Fritz von Wille – Maler der Eifel". In: Jahrbuch des Kreises Schleiden 1972. pp.27–33.
- Otto Baur, Alfred Kirfel, Margot Klütsch, Dirk Kocks and Heinz Ladendorf: Fritz v. Wille, der Maler der Eifel. Exhibition catalog, Daun 1979.
- Margot Klütsch: "Fritz von Wille, Werk und Wirkung", In: Conrad Peter Joist (Ed.): Landschaftsmaler der Eifel im 20. Jahrhundert. Düren 1997, pp.9–24.
- Margot Klütsch: "Wille, Fritz von", In: Hans Paffrath (Ed.): Lexikon der Düsseldorfer Malerschule 1819–1918. Vol.3: Nabert–Zwecker, Bruckmann, ISBN 3-7654-3011-0
