= Verein zur Veranstaltung von Kunstausstellungen =

German association

The Verein zur Veranstaltung von Kunstausstellungen is a registered association in Düsseldorf, initiated in 1898 by Fritz Roeber and formally founded on 31 May 1900 to regularly hold large art exhibitions in an exhibition building to be built for this purpose, the later Kunstpalast, and thereby promote the development of art in Düsseldorf. Today it has its headquarters in the artists' studio house at Sittarder Straße 5 in Pempelfort. To this day, it organises the Große Kunstausstellung NRW Düsseldorf and assembles a jury that awards the Kunstpreis der Künstler every year. For this purpose, the statutes of the Museum Kunstpalast foundation guarantee him the right to hold an annual art exhibition.

== History ==
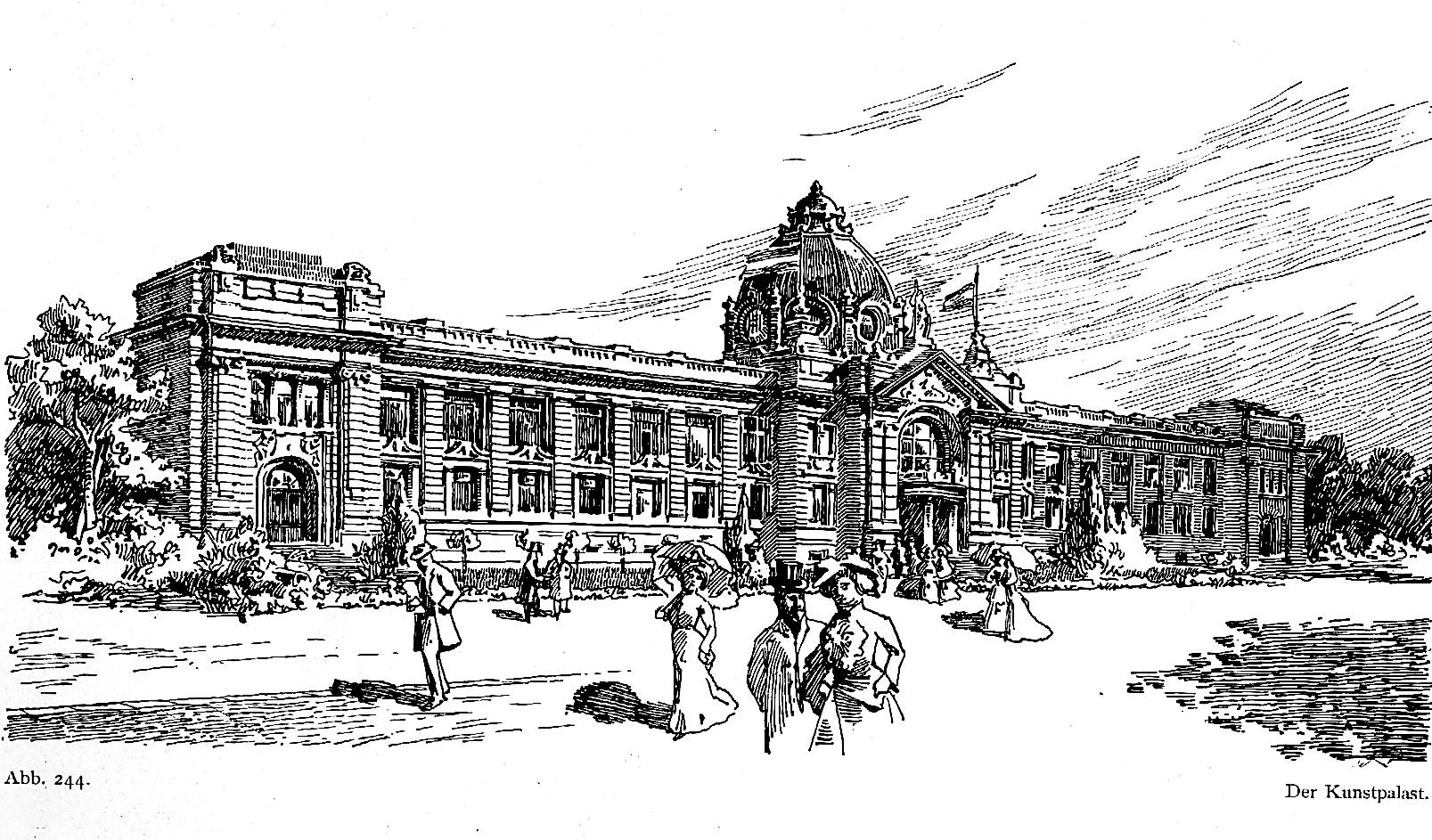
Kunstpalast, contemporary illustration

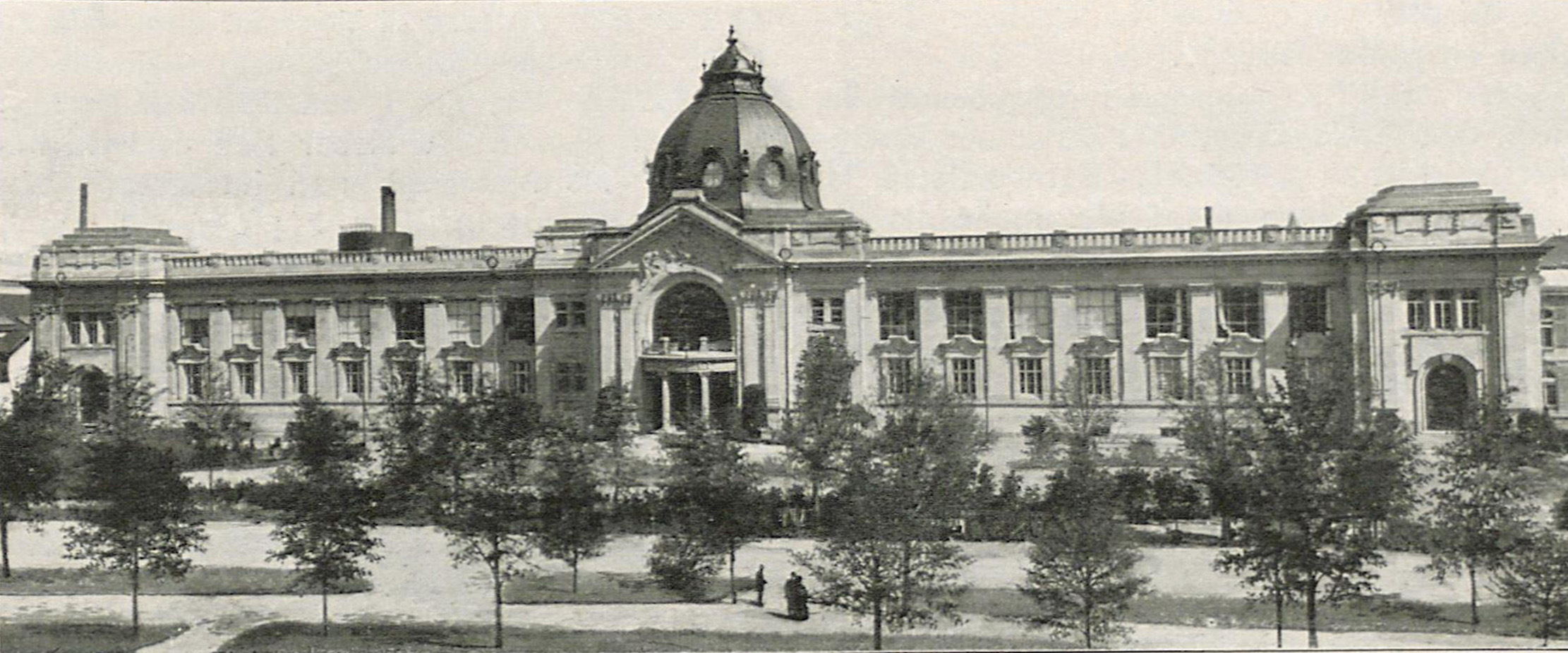
Kunstpalast, contemporary photo

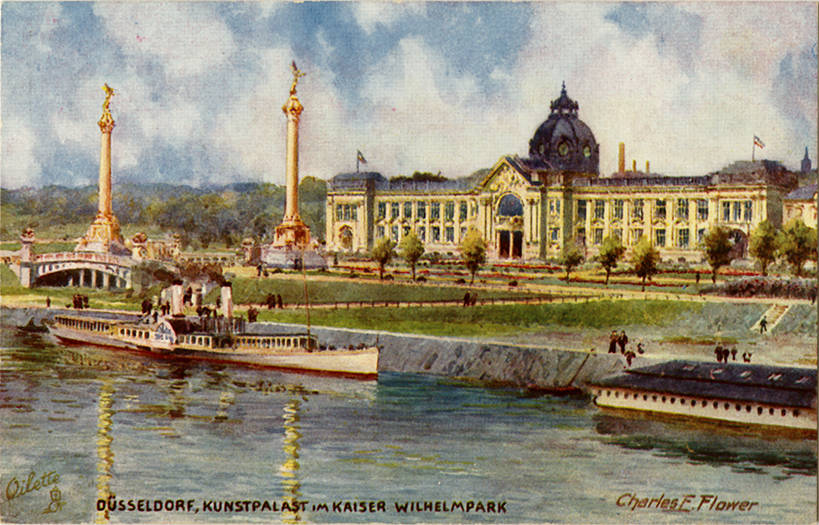
Kunstpalast in Kaiser-Wilhelm-Park, depiction of the Kunstpalast with gardens and squares on the banks of the Rhine, illustration by Charles E. Flower, 1911

Following the example of the Petit Palais of the Exposition Universelle (1900), built from 1897 onwards, protagonists of the Düsseldorf artistic community in the Verein der Düsseldorfer Künstler and around Fritz Roeber, then secretary of the Kunstakademie Düsseldorf and from 1908 its director, longed for a building for representative art exhibitions in Düsseldorf. To this end, they organised themselves into an association in 1898, which was formally founded on 31 May 1900. Fritz Roeber was unanimously elected chairman of the association, presiding over a board of 12 people. The association's office initially resided in the Malkasten-Haus. By council resolutions of 21 February 1899 and 19 September 1917, the association was granted the privilege of holding art exhibitions in the Kunstpalast at any time.

This project was closely intertwined with Düsseldorf's urban development at the end of the 19th century. In the phase of high industrialisationin Germany, the prospering city of Düsseldorf tackled the projects of a new port on the Lausward and the Rhine bank advance including a Rheinpark Golzheim to solve questions of port construction and flood protection. In this situation, Fritz Roeber campaigned to use a building site gained in the process on the Pempelforter Rheinufer - north of the Oberkasseler Brücke built from 1896 onwards - for the construction of an exhibition building. The exhibition building was to be combined with a trade and industry exhibition on the Golzheim Island, for which there were many advocates among the boards of major industry, after the Gewerbeausstellung für Rheinland, Westfalen und benachbarte Bezirke in Verbindung mit der 4. Allgemeinen Deutschen Kunst-Ausstellung held in Düsseldorf in 1880 had been very successful.

The main purpose of the exhibition building was to provide Düsseldorf artists, whose work had been overshadowed by the glittering art metropolises of Munich and Berlin, with improved opportunities for presentation and marketing. It was obvious to join forces with the large-scale industry booming on the Rhine and Ruhr, to which Fritz Roeber, as a co-founder and member of the Düsseldorf "Central-Gewerbe-Verein", had good connections. To finance the building, which in 1902 took shape with the Kunstpalast in Art Nouveau forms on a municipal site and became the property of the city of Düsseldorf, a building and operating fund fed by various public and private funds as well as a segregated fund were set up and interest-bearing share certificates were issued to third parties, the proceeds of which the association was to generate by holding art exhibitions. For this purpose, the association was granted permanent exhibition rights. After the 1902 Industrie- und Gewerbeausstellung Düsseldorf and the 1904 Garden festival had already generated so much profit that the subscribers to the guarantee fund could be paid, the association took the decision in 1906 to hold large annual art exhibitions, such as those regularly held in Munich and Berlin. In its exhibition policy, the association, in which a bourgeois understanding of art in the tradition of the Düsseldorf school of painting initially prevailed, soon came into conflict with the up-and-coming generation of artists, especially the Movement Young Rhineland.

Until 1932, the association regularly organised art exhibitions in the Kunstpalast. After the Third Reich, in which the association was largely incapacitated by Gleichschaltung, it resumed its work in 1950. From 1950 to 1977, exhibitions were held in the Kunstpalast under the title "Winter Exhibition of the Artists of North Rhine-Westphalia". Since 1978, the exhibition, which is now held annually at the Kunstpalast Düsseldorf, has borne its own name, "Grosse Kunstausstellung NRW Düsseldorf". After the Kunstpalast was rebuilt to accommodate the headquarters of E.ON behind the Ehrenhof, the cultural institutions there were reorganised and brought together under the umbrella of the Stiftung Museum Kunstpalast. In its statutes, the association had the right to hold an annual exhibition guaranteed.
