= Eugen Dücker =

Baltic German artist (1841–1916)

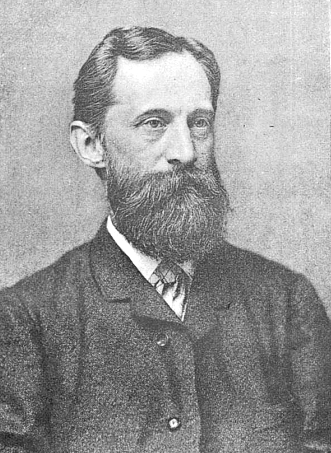
- Dücker in 1885
- Born: Eugen Gustav Dücker; 10 February [O.S. 29 January] 1841; Arensburg, Governorate of Livonia, Russian Empire
- Died: 6 December 1916; Düsseldorf, German Empire
- Education: Imperial Academy of Arts (1862)
- Known for: Landscape painting
- Awards: Big Gold Medal of the Imperial Academy of Arts (1862)
- Elected: Member Academy of Arts (1868); Professor by rank (1873)

Eugen Gustav Dücker (German pronunciation: [ˈɔʏɡeːn ˈɡʊstaːf ˈdʏkɐ, ˈɔʏɡn̩ -]; 10 February [O.S. 29 January] 1841 – 6 December 1916) was a German landscape painter, born a Russian Imperial subject on Saaremaa (then Governorate of Livonia, present-day Estonia), associated with the Düsseldorfer Malerschule.

== Biography ==
He was born to Eduard Dücker (1813–1886), a master carpenter, and his wife, Amalie née Fischer (1810–1880). His younger sister, Marie, also became a painter. His first drawing lessons were with the lithographer, Friedrich Sigismund Stern.

From 1858 to 1862, he was enrolled at the Imperial Academy of Arts in Saint Petersburg. There, he studied sculpture with David Jensen, and landscape painting with Sokrat Vorobiev. Upon graduating, he was awarded a six-year grant for a study trip through Europe. He made lengthy stops in Munich and Karlsruhe, where he took lessons from Karl Friedrich Lessing.

In 1864, he went to Düsseldorf, and would remain there for the rest of his life. He began taking students; notably the Norwegian landscape artist, Adelsteen Normann, and succeeded Oswald Achenbach as the landscape instructor at the Kunstakademie in 1872. Two years later, he married Regina Schneeloch. In his later years, he was a member of the progressive artists' association, Malkasten.

His well known pupils at the Akademie included Heinrich Hermanns, Franz Korwan, Georg Macco, Otto Modersohn, Fritz Overbeck, Edgar Meyer, Heinrich Petersen-Angeln, Oskar Hoffmann and Carl Wuttke. Despite his career's roots in Germany, he spent much of his time in Estonia, where he painted idyllic landscapes of the sea and the countryside. He also made numerous trips to Holland, Belgium, France and Italy.

Perhaps his best known painting is Coastal landscape (Fishermen going home).

== Gallery ==
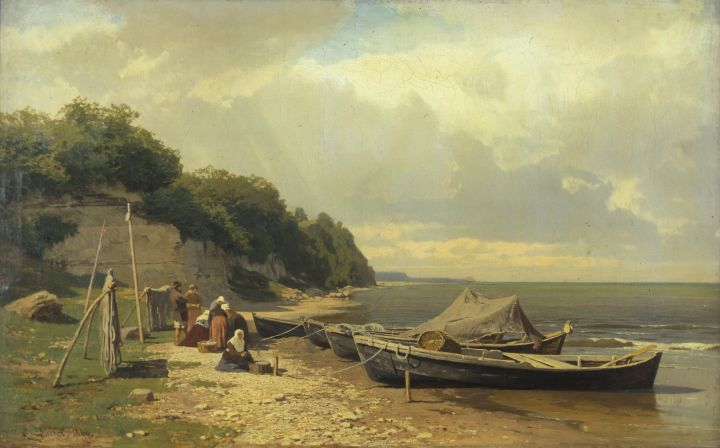
Seashore at Tiskre (1866)

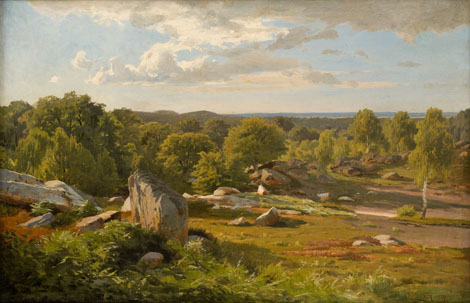
Rügen landscape (1869)

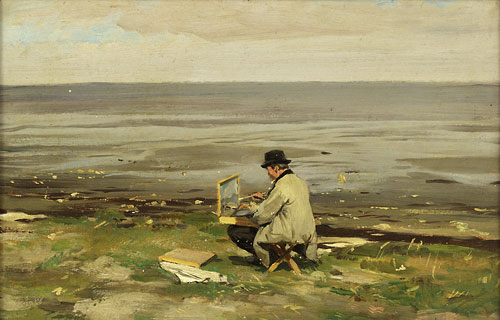
Self-portrait, by the Baltic Sea
(ca. 1900)

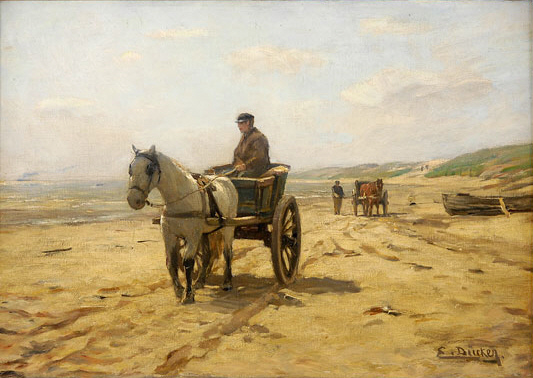
Crab Fisher on the Ostseestrand
