= Adolf Schill =

German painter (1848–1911)

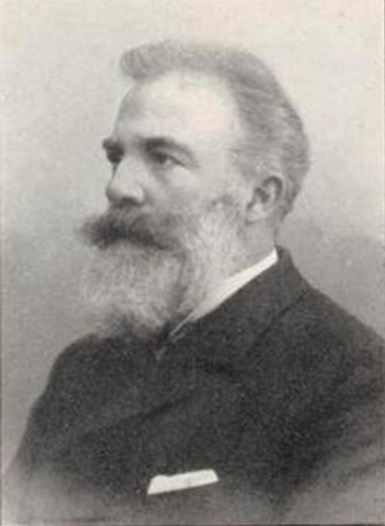
Adolf Schill

Adolf Schill, often also Adolph Schill (14 May 1848 – 10 November 1911), was a German architect, interior designer, artisan, illustrator and painter of the historism. As a university lecturer he worked at the Kunstakademie Düsseldorf between 1880 and 1911, thus helping to shape the later phase of the Düsseldorf school of painting. Students of sculpture also studied with him.

== Life ==
Born in Stuttgart, Schill attended the State Academy of Fine Arts Stuttgart from 1864 to 1870, where he was introduced by the eclectic Christian Friedrich von Leins was taught architecture and Adolf Gnauth in stylistics. From 1870 to 1874, he deepened his knowledge of architecture while building the Vienna Ringtheater under Emil von Förster. He then embarked on a two-year Grand Tour to Italy, which had a lasting impact on his sense of beauty. He later travelled to Italy again several times. Between 1876 and 1880, Schill – as successor to Wilhelm Sophonias Bäumer – edited the journal Gewerbehalle, the "organ for progress in all branches of the art industry" published by the Stuttgart Engelhorn Verlag. In 1880 Schill, succeeding Wilhelm Lotz, who had died suddenly in 1879 – became professor of decoration and ornamentation at the Düsseldorf Art Academy; he held this position until the end of his life in 1911. As head of a so-called "decoration" or "architecture" class, he taught many students basic knowledge of style and architecture, which was indispensable for the execution of monumental murals. He compiled a Collection of Gypsabgüsse aus kunstgewerblichen und dekorativen Mustern for teaching purposes. Schill's watercolour paintings, which he produced after travel studies, had a great influence on his students. Like many other players in Düsseldorf's art scene, Schill was a member of the Malkasten. In Düsseldorf's public life, Schill appeared as a judge in competitions for the erection of monuments, such as the Moltkedenkmal.

In 1882, Schill married in the Trinitatiskirche in Elberfeld Emmy Simons (30 August 1858 in Elberfeld), a niece of the architect Walter Kyllmann, who bore him the children Lisbeth, Adolf, Addy and Lore Schill. In 1889, Schill lived with his family at Blumenstraße 12, at that time a street in a Gründerzeit new building district Düsseldorf. In January 1912, Schill was honoured by a memorial exhibition at the Kunstgewerbemuseum Düsseldorf. The commemorative speech was given by Heinrich Kraeger.

== Work ==
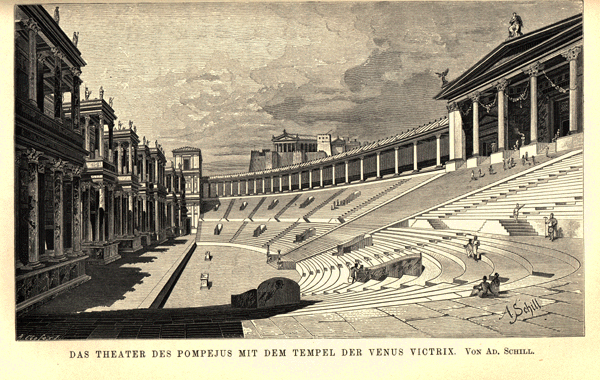
Das Theater des Pompejus mit dem Tempel der Venus Victrix, book illustration

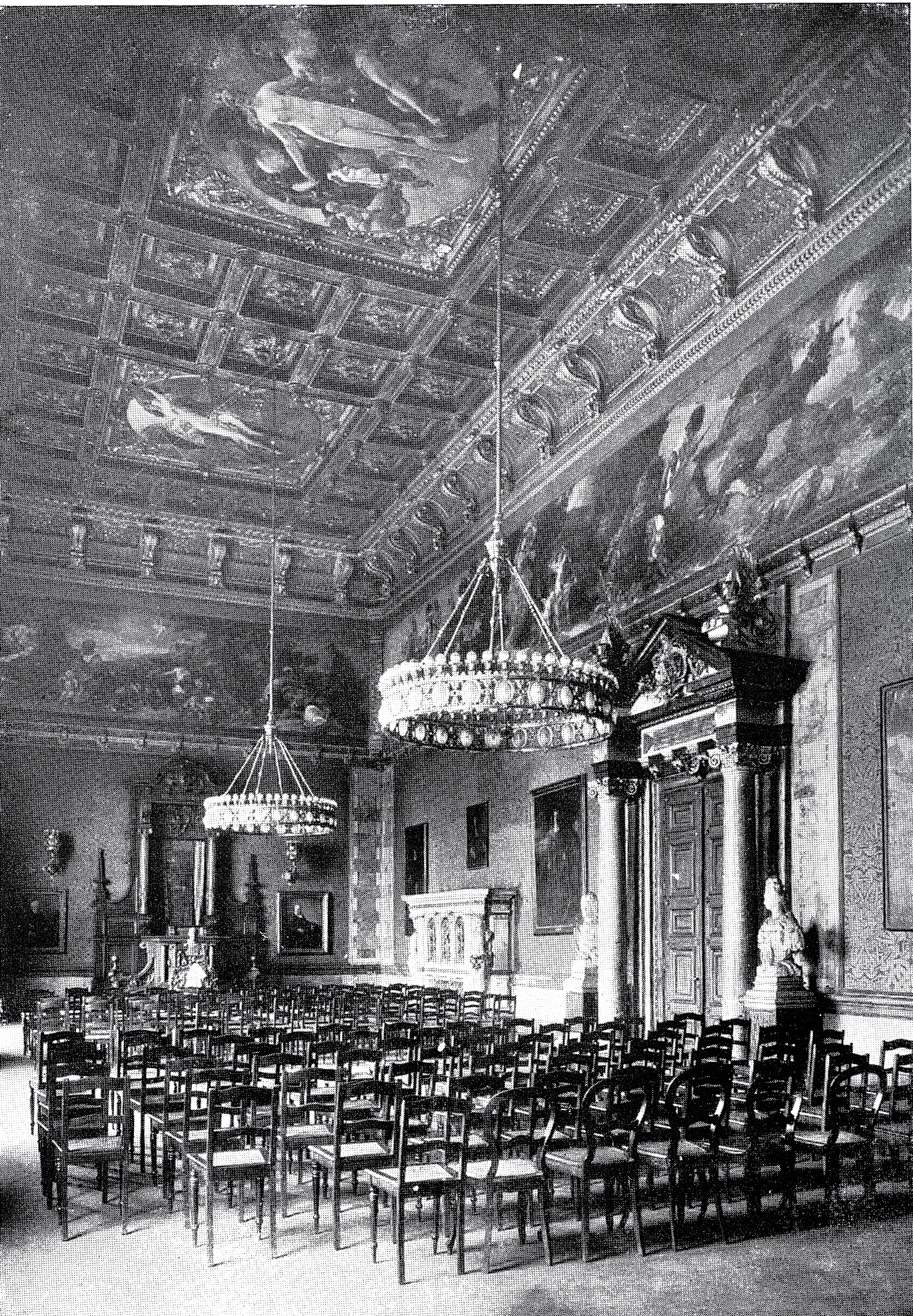
Aula of the Kunstakademie Düsseldorf, ca. 1900

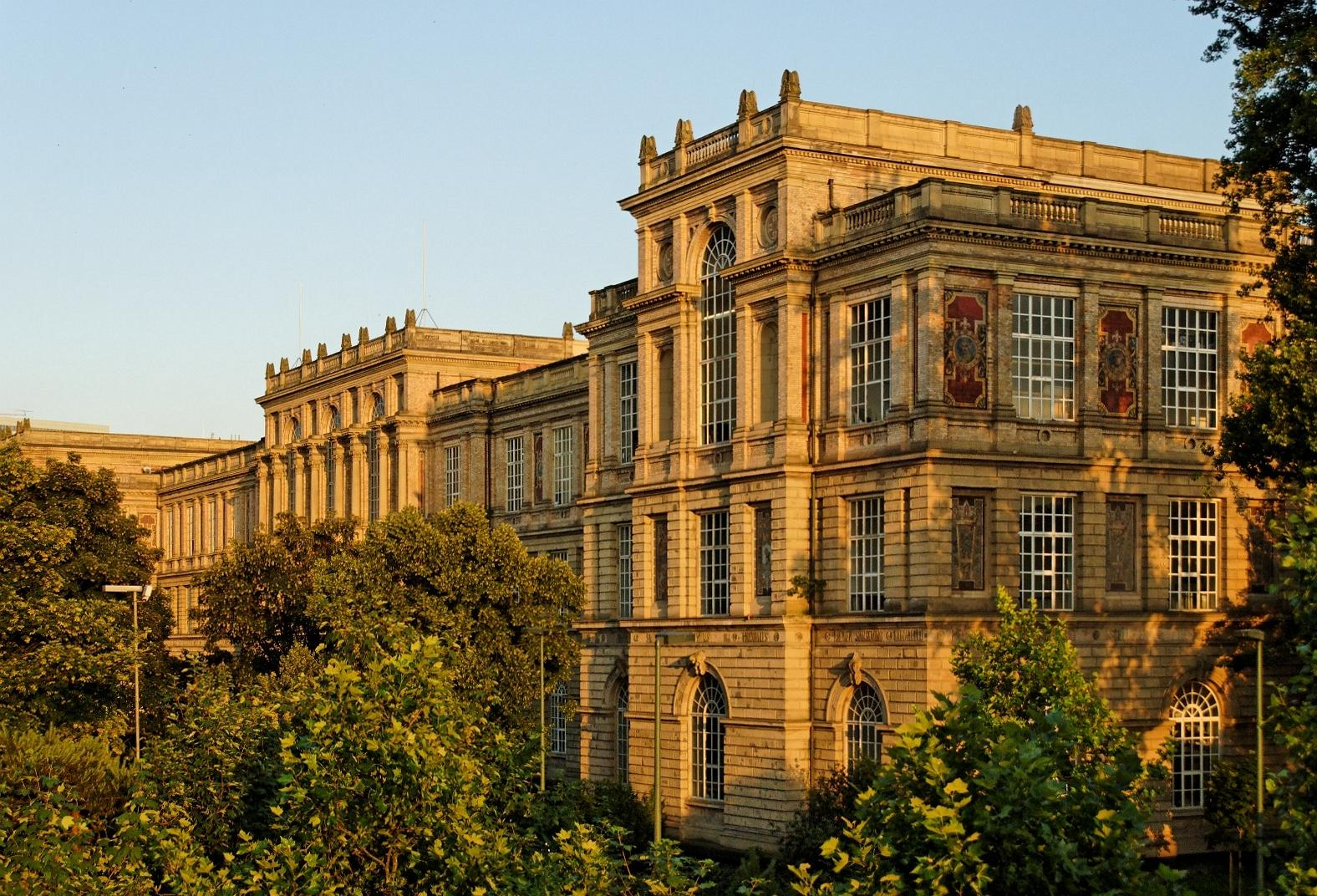
Pin mosaics on the façades of the Kunstakademie Düsseldorf

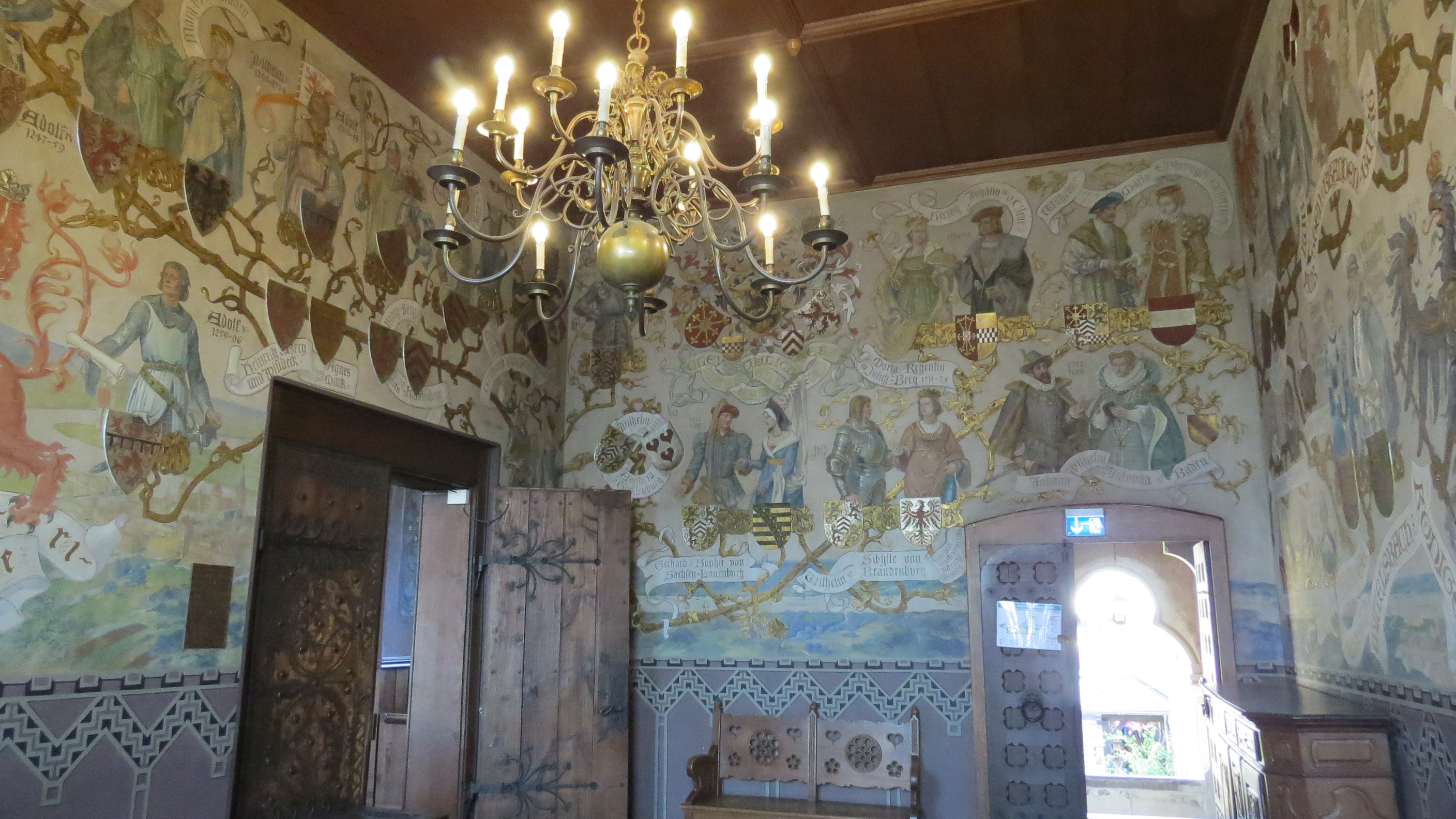
Mural Stammbaum der bergischen Herrscher in the ancestral hall of the Burg castle

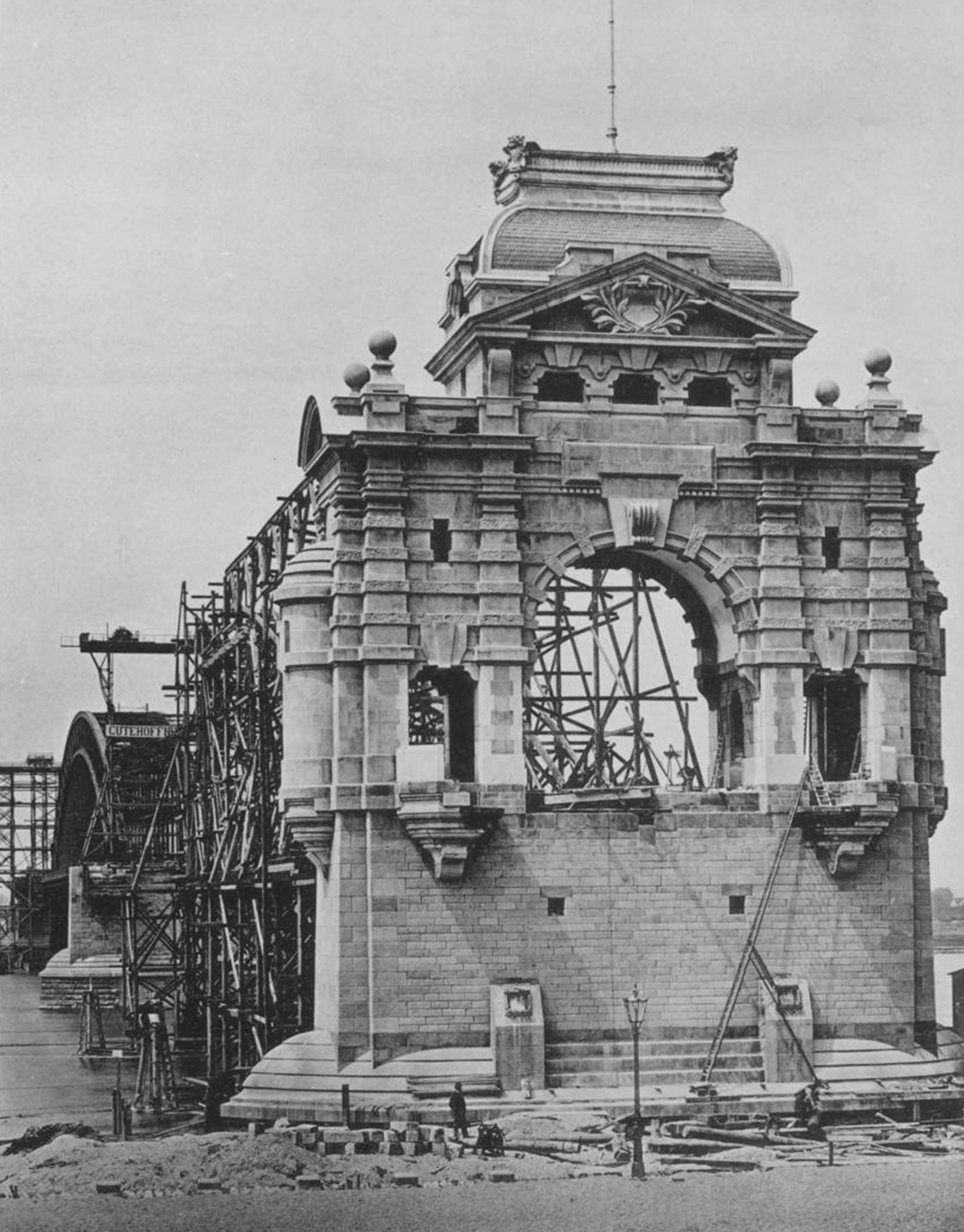
Right bank pier of the old Oberkasseler Brücke after completion, 9 June 1898

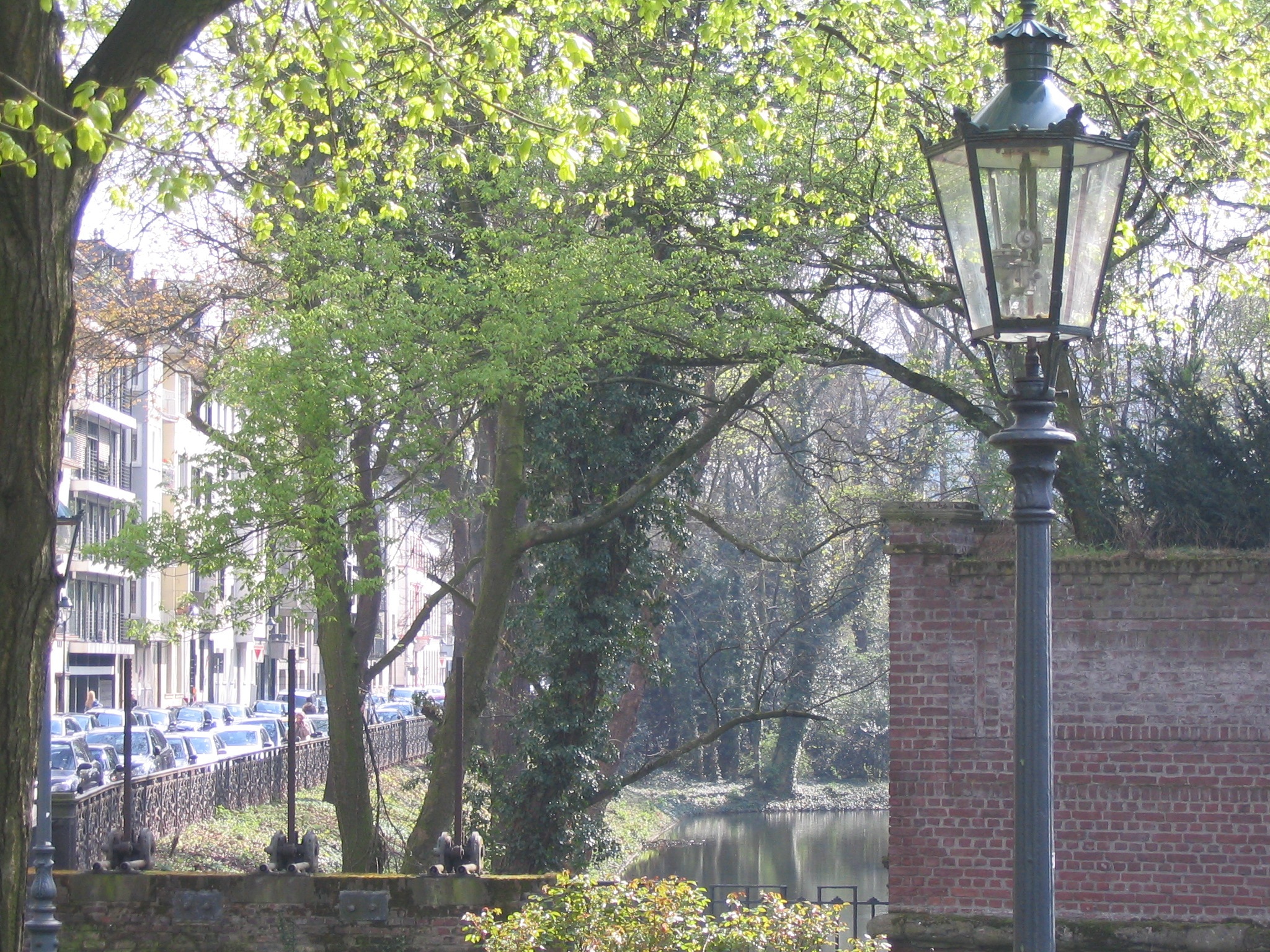
Bridge railing of the old Oberkasseler Brücke (left), Today parapet on Spee’scher Graben in Carlstadt, photo 2012

As a painter, Schill was known at the end of the 19th century, alongside Adolf Seel, above all for watercolours depicting "architectural pieces", particularly rendering architectural impressions from Italy. In the field of arts and crafts, he created illustrations as well as so-called ornamental pieces and vignettes as book decorations from the 1870s onwards. After a study trip to Belgium in 1870, he published the travel sketches he made there with architectural motifs. In 1891, Schill was called in to design the Peace Hall in the Osnabrück Town Hall.

As an architect, Schill accepted various private commissions. A special opportunity for him to realise his architectural ideas came at the end of the 19th century when he was commissioned by the banker and city councillor Moritz Leiffmann (1853–1921) for the construction of the upper-class Villa Leiffmann in the Düsseldorf district of Golzheim. Schill designed an eclectici building with a [double-tower façade that was reminiscent of a villa of Italian Renaissance. In Düsseldorf, the painter Georg Oeder also consulted him for the interior decoration of his Wohnhaus am Hofgarten. Until the 1890s, Schill – together with Peter Janssen – developed the decorative furnishings for the assembly hall of the New Academy of Arts in Düsseldorf, which was completed in 1879. The widely acclaimed Gesamtkunstwerk was shown to interested strangers for a fee in the late 1890s. In the course of his "academy reform" around 1930, academy director Walter Kaesbach had the historical furnishings of the auditorium removed except for Janssen's paintings and had the walls decorated in gold, a measure criticised by Paul Clemen in 1944 as unjustified.

Another collaboration between Schill and Janssen resulted in gravestones in Kleve, Dortmund and Düsseldorf. He also designed the silver table ornaments presented by the Prussian Rhine Province and the Province of Westphalia to the German Crown Prince and Crown Princess for their Wedding in 1881. In 1894, maiolica stoves were created in Meissen for the King's Room and the Great Hall of the Society Casino zu Coblenz according to designs by Schill. In the years 1896 to 1898 Schill designed the historistic Portal architecture of the Oberkasseler Brücke. The historicist bridge railing designed by Schill was part of the first Oberkassel Bridge built shortly before the turn of the century, which was blown up by retreating German troops in March 1945. After the makeshift bridge was dismantled in 1973, parts of the ornately forged bridge railing were reused as parapets on Poststraße (Spee'scher Graben) and on Haroldstraße (Schwanenspiegel, Parkanlage am Ständehaus). Around 1900, Schill created the pinmosaics on the outer facade of the upper floors of the Düsseldorf Academy of Arts.

From 1901 to 1902 Schill, together with Josef Kleesattel held the overall architectural direction of the Industrie- und Gewerbeausstellung Düsseldorf, after the first artistic director Georg Thielen had died unexpectedly in February 1901. Together with Kleesattel, he also completed the design and construction work for its main industrial hall, in the design of which Kaiser Wilhelm II had personally intervened. He also designed, together with Kleesattel, the pavilion of the Rheinische Metallwaren- und Maschinenfabrik, built on a footprint of 30 metres by 40 metres, which also stood on the main avenue of the exhibition. Until 1904 he was head of the building department of the International Art Exhibition and Great Horticultural Exhibition in Düsseldorf. Between 1896 and 1908, Schill – together with the provincial conservator Paul Clemen, the academy professors Eduard von Gebhardt and Peter Janssen the Ä. as well as other artists - supported the painting of the Knights' Hall of Schloss Burg an der Wupper. With his collaborator Johannes Osten, he created a family tree of the Bergian rulers in Gothic ornamentation.

== Students ==
- Hermann Angermeyer (1876–1955)
- Arthur Bambridge (1861–1923)
- Arthur Bartels (1874–after 1950)
- Carl Becker (1862–1926)
- Willy von Beckerath (1868–1938)
- Robert Böninger (1869–1935)
- Karl Wilhelm Dahl (1869–1942)
- Hans Deiters (1868–1922)
- Friedrich Dorn (1861–1901)
- Bruno Ehrich (1861–1947)
- Hermann vom Endt (1861–1939)
- Robert Engels (1866–1926)
- Felix Frang (1862–1932)
- Wilhelm Fritzel (1870–1943)
- Theodor Funck (1867–1919)
- Henry Ludwig Geertz (1872–after 1930)
- Isaac Alexander Gibbs (1849–1889)
- Jean Grothe (1865–1924)
- Herman van der Haar (1867–1938)
- Lewis Edward Herzog (1868–1943)
- Hermann Hidding (1863–1925)
- Bernhard Hoetger (1874–1949)
- Meinrad Iten (1867–1932)
- Karl Kahl (1873–1938)
- Friedrich Klein-Chevalier (1861–1938)
- Wilhelm Lehmbruck (1881–1919)
- Willy Lucas (1884–1918)
- Carl Murdfield (1868–1944)
- Paul Neuenborn (1866–1913)
- Heinrich Nüttgens (1866–1951)
- Gustav Olms (1864–1927)
- Johannes Osten (1867–1952).
- Peter Philippi (1866–1945)
- Paul Raud (1865–1930)
- Jacob Ritsema (1869–1943)
- Lore Schill (1890–1968)
- Adolf Schönnenbeck (1869–1965)
- Wilhelm Schreuer (1866–1933)
- Paul Schroeter (1866–1946)
- Sergei Shcherbatov (1874–1962)
- Emil Schultz-Riga (1872–1931)
- Emil Schwabe (1856–1924)
- Alfred Sohn-Rethel (1875–1958).
- Otto Sohn-Rethel (1877–1949)
- Carl Strathmann (1866–1939)
- Emile Vauthier (1864–1946)
- Heinrich Vogeler (1872–1942)
- Torsten Wasastjerna (1863–1924).
- Robert Weise (1870–1923)
