= Paul Schroeter =

German painter and etcher

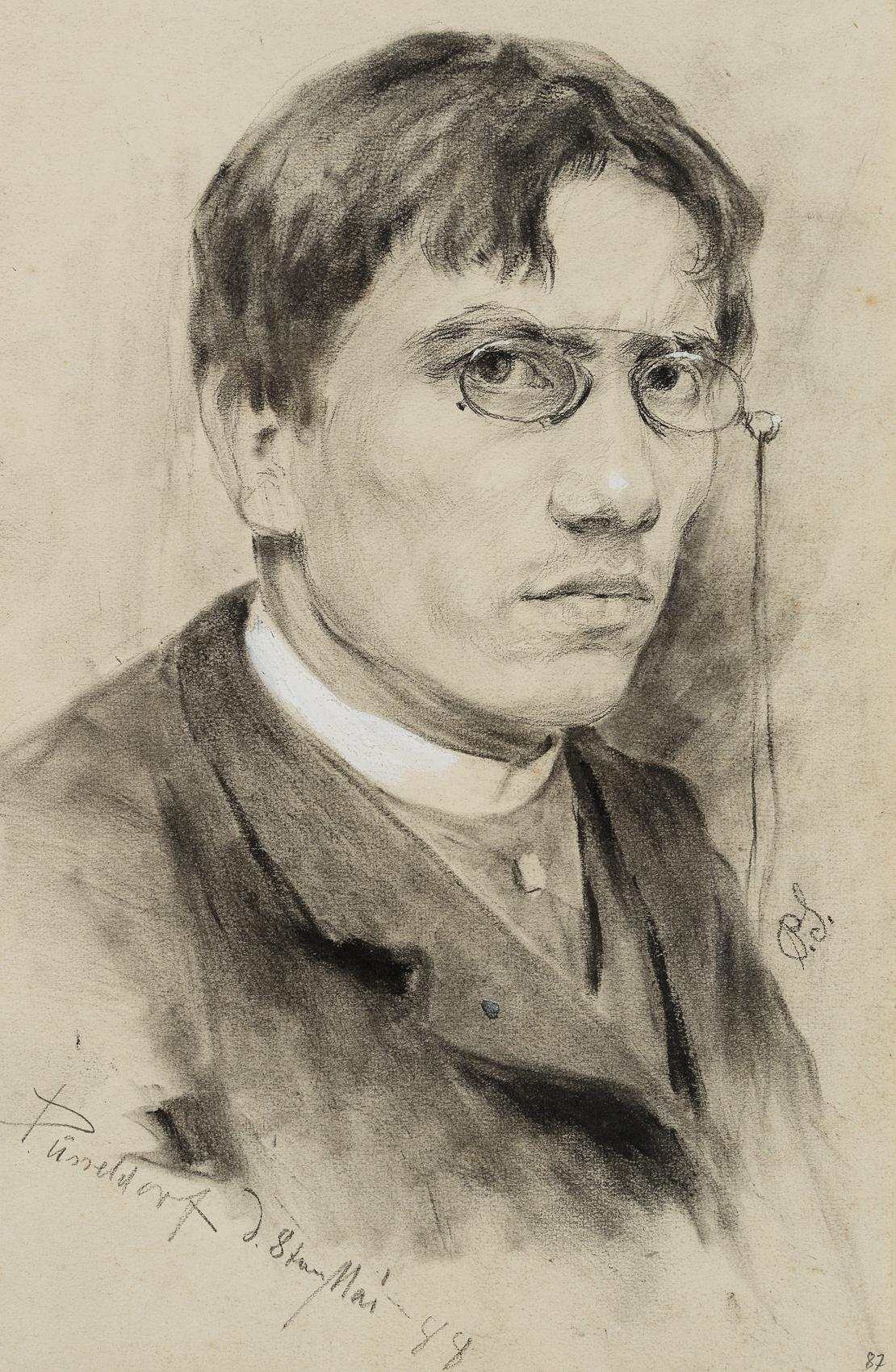
Self-portrait (1888)

Paul Alfred Schroeter or Schröter (26 October 1866, Kempen - 1946, Rheinsberg) was a German painter and etcher.

== Life and work ==
He was descended from an old Hamburg family. In the 1880s, he studied at the Kunstakademie Düsseldorf with Eduard von Gebhardt, Johann Peter Theodor Janssen and Adolf Schill. There, he befriended Fritz Overbeck and became a member of the student association known as "Tartarus"; providing illustrations for their occasional publications. Their fellow student, Peter Philippi, would later call Tartarus one of the most important artistic associations in Düsseldorf, after the professional group, Malkasten, describing its members as young, sociable and refreshing.

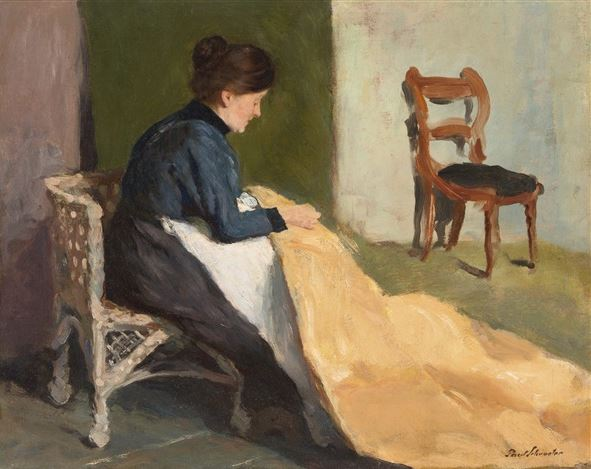
Marianne

From there, he transferred to the Academy of Fine Arts, Munich, and joined the Allgemeine Deutsche Kunstgenossenschaft. He remained there for a few years, becoming a member of the Munich Secession, and participating in their first exhibition of 1893. This was followed by study trips to Holland, Belgium and Spain and, for a short time, he was a resident of the Willingshausen Artists' Colony. In 1895, he was awarded a large gold medal at the Große Berliner Kunstausstellung.

From 1898 to 1901, he lived in Hamburg where, together with Ernst Eitner and Arthur Illies, he became a co-founder of the Hamburgischer Künstlerklub. He also provided illustrations, on commission, to the art journal, Jugend.

Overbeck was one of several friends who persuaded him to live at the new Worpsweder Artists' Colony. With his wife, Grete, and his children, he moved there in 1901. He moved again, in 1904, to Bremen, where he became a member of the Deutscher Künstlerbund. His portraits and landscapes were widely known, but the reviews were not always positive. Die Kunst, a popular art magazine, declared that his works were technically fine, but very "impersonal".

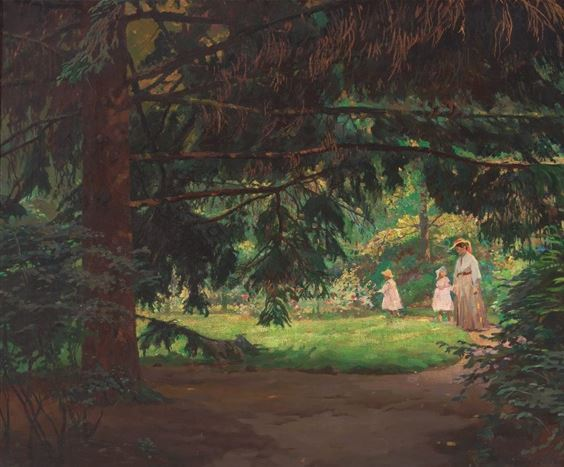
The Mother

In 1908, he left Bremen and settled near Berlin. He was a member of the Verein Berliner Künstler, but very little else is known about his later life. Many of his works are in private collections. Most of the others were destroyed during World War II.
