= Gustav Wendling =

German painter

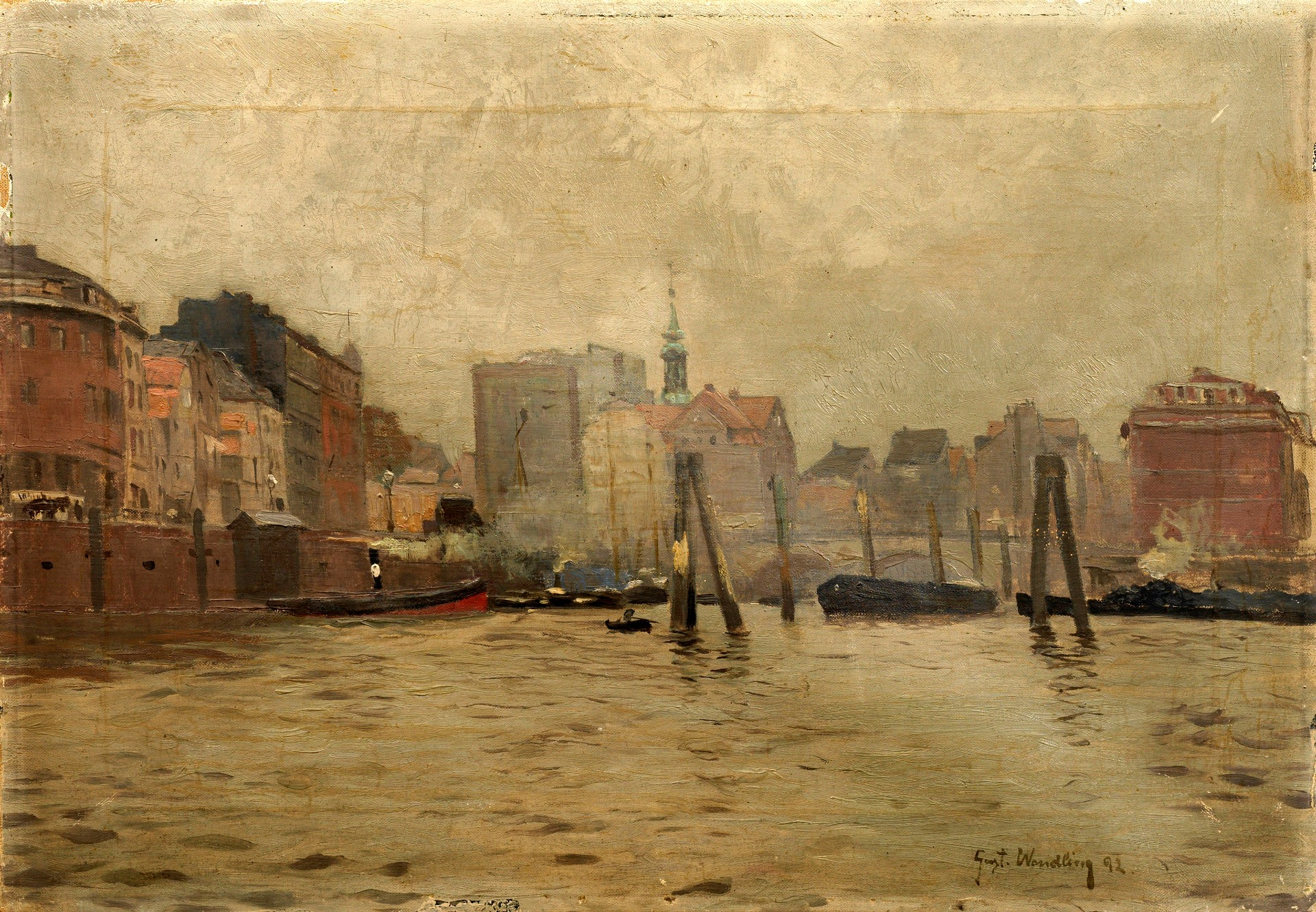
Hamburg Harbor

Gustav Wendling (7 June 1862 – 17 October 1932) was a German history, landscape and marine painter; associated with the Düsseldorfer Malerschule.

== Life and work ==
He was born in Büddenstedt. At the age of seventeen, he enrolled at the Kunstakademie Düsseldorf, where he studied landscape painting with Eugen Dücker. From 1884 to 1886, he was Dücker's master student. In the latter year, he went to the United States, to join a group of German painters in Milwaukee who had been commissioned by the American Panorama Company to paint cycloramas and panoramas of the Civil War. A photograph from that period shows him and his fellow artists in front of a cyclorama of the Battle of Chattanooga. From 1887, together with Paul Wilhelmi and Otto von Ernst, he ran the "New Academy of Fine Arts" in Detroit.

After a study trip to Norway in 1888, he persuaded his friend, Ernst Eitner, to work with him at the Gothmund Artists' Colony, where he had created his first works. In 1889, together with Heinrich Hermanns, Olof Jernberg, Helmuth Liesegang, August Deusser, Otto Heichert and Arthur Kampf, he helped co-found the "St. Lucas Club", which was opposed to the exhibition practices of the academies and, among other things, sought to revive the art of printmaking.

For two years, from 1893, Max Clarenbach was his student. In 1895, he was awarded third prize in a competition to design a large mural for the council chamber in Bochum, which he had designed with Friedrich Klein-Chevalier. From 1898 to 1902, together with Hugo Ungewitter and Clarenbach, he created a 15 x 120 meter (roughly 49 x 394 ft.) cyclorama, depicting General Gebhard Leberecht von Blücher crossing the Rhine near Kaub in 1814. Originally created for a trade and industrial fair in Düsseldorf, it toured Germany and drew large crowds in Berlin. In his later years, he lived near Braunschweig. He died in 1932 in Königslutter.
