= Karl Kahl =

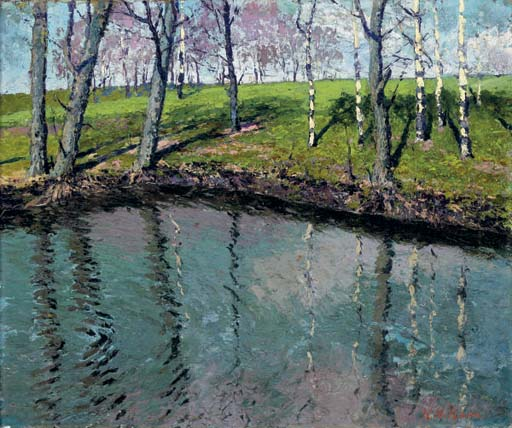
Spring

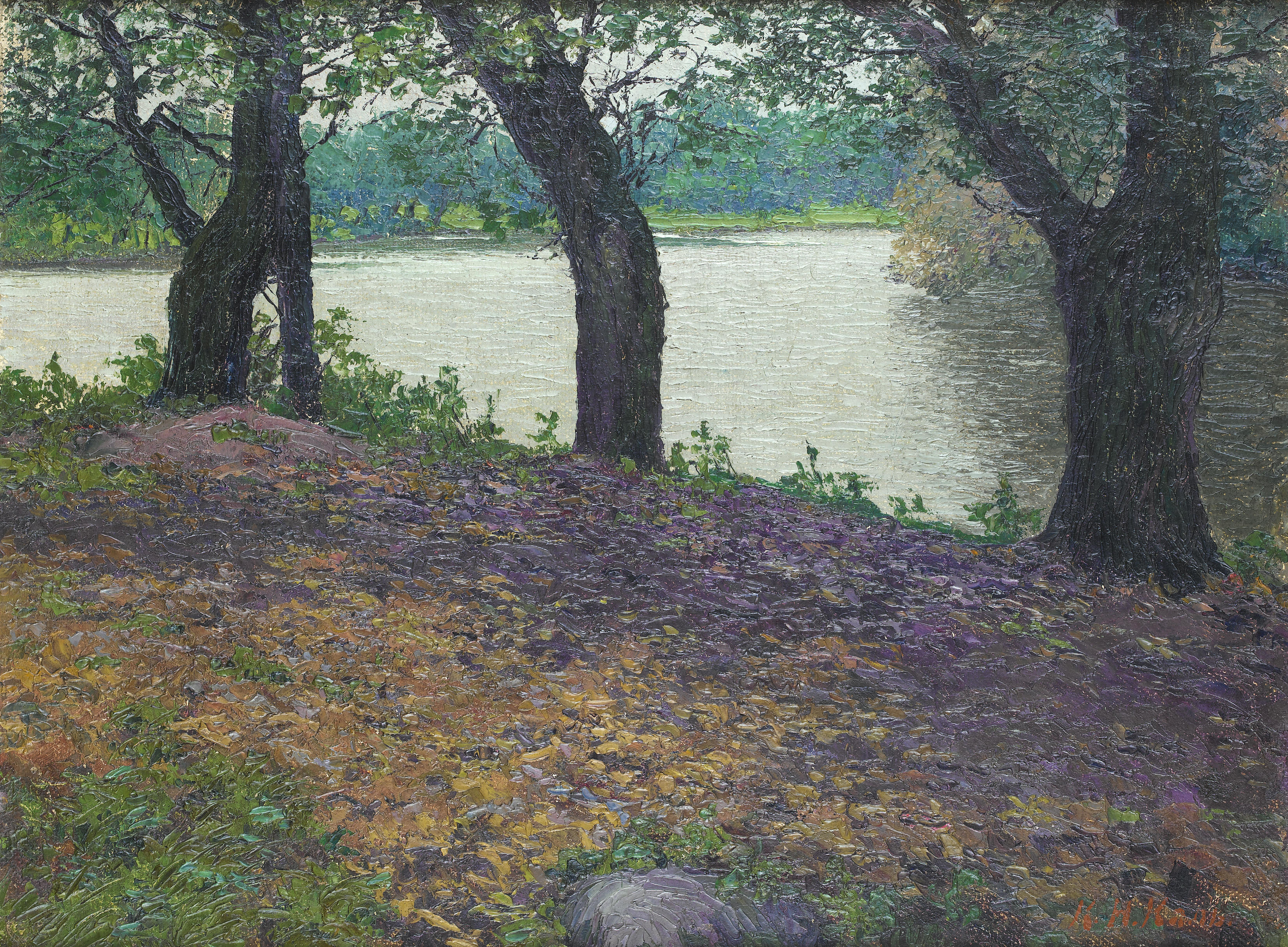
On the River

Karl Nikolaevich Kahl (Russian: Карл Николаевич Каль; 1873, Riga - 20 January 1938, Tomsk) was a Baltic-German landscape painter, associated with the Düsseldorfer Malerschule. He fell victim to the Great Purge of the late 1930s.

== Life and work ==
From 1891 to 1893, he studied in Vitebsk, then enrolled at the Kunstakademie Düsseldorf. There, his primary instructors were Heinrich Lauenstein, Hugo Crola and Adolf Schill Later, he studied with Arthur Kampf and Johann Peter Theodor Janssen.

After graduating, he spent time in Munich and Karlsruhe. He also visited Belgium, Holland, and Paris, then returned to Düsseldorf. He stayed there only a short time before going back to Vitebsk in 1898. He exhibited eighteen paintings at the Louisiana Purchase Exposition in St. Louis in 1904. After 1911, he lived and worked in Vladivostok, painting and teaching at a private school.

On 28 April 1935, he was arrested and, in October, sentenced to five years in a labor camp. He was taken to camp #2 in Tomsk, where he was able to work as a painter. There, in December 1937, he was arrested again and charged with spying for Germany. He was sentenced to death the following month. Two weeks later, he was executed by firing squad. In 1965, he was rehabilitated by the Supreme Court of the Soviet Union.
