= Robert Engels (artist) =

German artist (1866 – 1926)

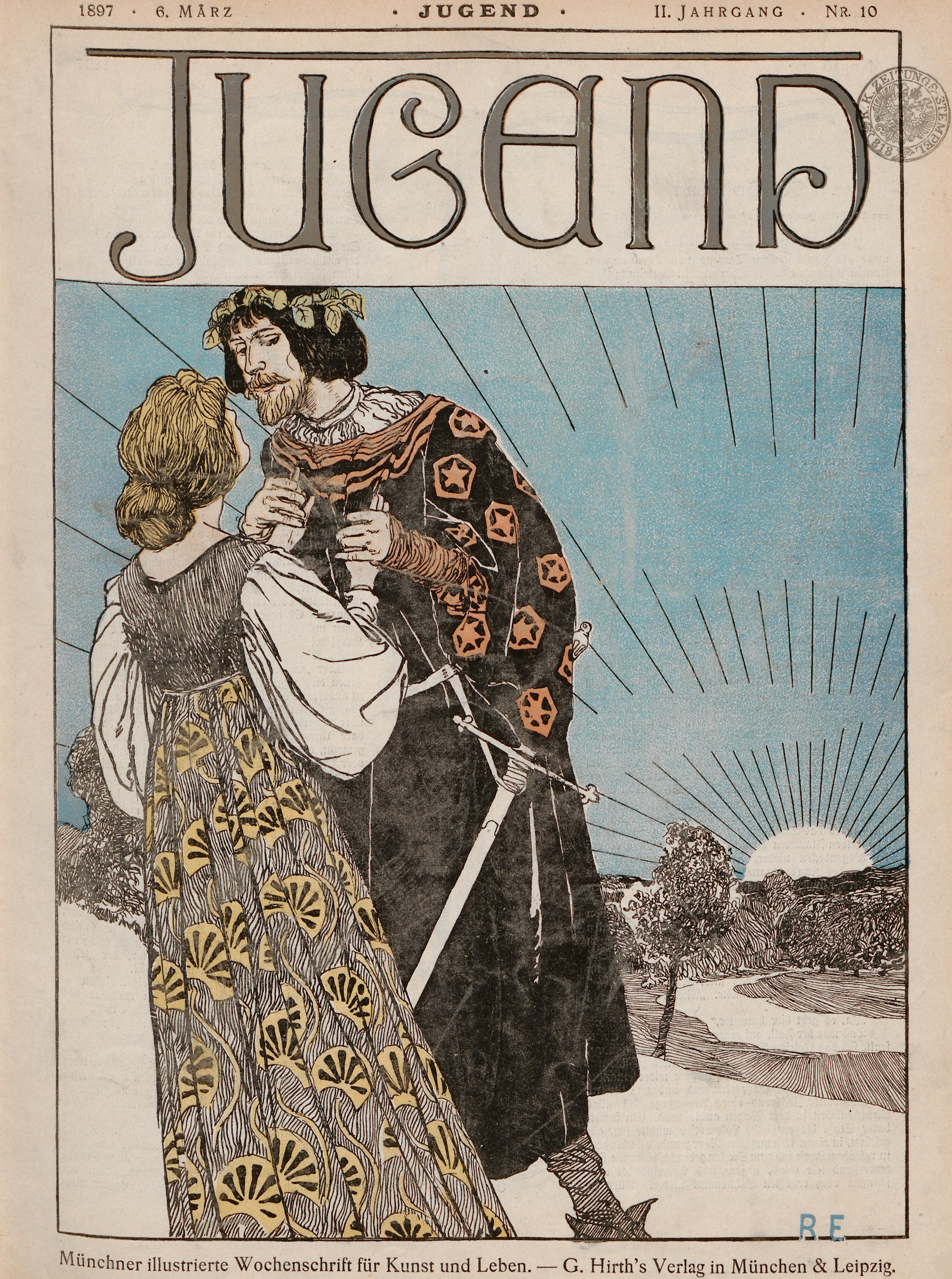
Engels' cover for Jugend #10 (1897)

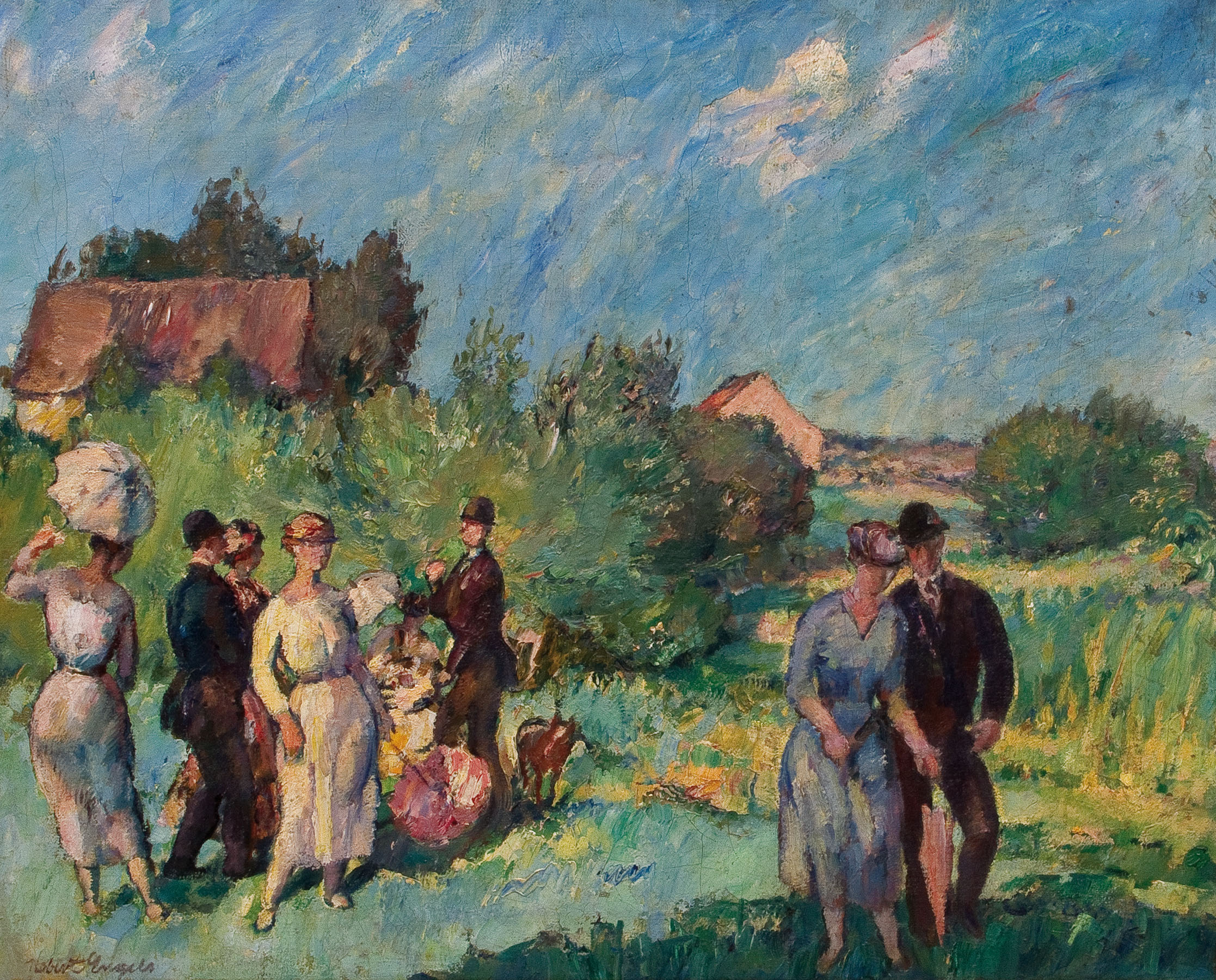
Festive Gathering in the Countryside

Robert Engels (9 March 1866, Solingen - 24 May 1926, Munich) was a German painter, illustrator, lithographer, designer, and art teacher.

== Biography ==
He was the eldest son of a dealer in steel goods, also named Robert Engels, and his wife Auguste, née Kirschbaum. He was trained to take over the family business, but had little interest in it so, after his father's death in 1885, he left it to his younger siblings and enrolled at the Kunstakademie Düsseldorf, where he studied until 1889.

His instructors there included Hugo Crola, Johann Peter Theodor Janssen, Heinrich Lauenstein and Adolf Schill. Following his graduation, he made some lengthy stays in France, Belgium and England; eventually deciding to settle in Düsseldorf, where he became a regular contributor to the magazine Jugend.

In 1898, this led to the offer of a teaching position at the Königliche Kunstgewerbeschule in Munich, which he accepted. There, in 1908, he married one of his students, Gustava von Veith. He was named a Professor in 1910. Two years later, he became a member of the Deutscher Werkbund. His notable students included Franz Kolbrand, Erwin Bowien, Otto Michael Schmitt, and Carl Otto Müller.

He maintained contact with the artists' colony at Schondorf, received commissions from the Krupp family, designed church windows in Breslau and did scenographic work for theatres in Munich and Leipzig; all of which is documented in personal papers left by Gustava.

In 1934, she donated large parts of his artistic estate to the newly-created Robert Engels Memorial Foundation; funded by the city of Solingen. In return, she was granted a monthly pension. Another large part of his estate was donated in 1955. The remainder passed to Solingen following her death in 1970.

== Sources ==
- "Engels, Robert". In: Ulrich Thieme (Ed.): Allgemeines Lexikon der Bildenden Künstler von der Antike bis zur Gegenwart, Vol.10: Dubolon–Erlwein. E. A. Seemann, Leipzig 1914, pg.546 (Online)
- Franz Hendrichs: Robert Engels 1866–1926. Ein Lebensbild des Künstlers, Buchdruckerei der Bergischen Zeitung Wald, 1928
- Johann Karl: Professor Robert Engels Nachlaß, 1926. (Catalog for the estate sale)
- Robert Engels 1866–1926 (Catalog for the memorial exhibition), 1956 Deutsches Klingenmuseum Solingen
