= Jacob Ritsema =

Dutch painter (1869–1943)

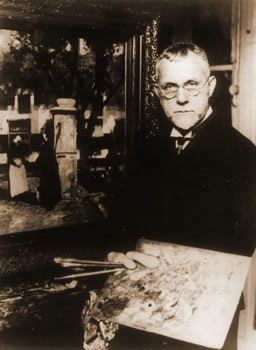
Jacob Ritsema (1910)

Jacob Coenraad Ritsema (10 June 1869, Haarlem - 15 December 1943, Laren) was a Dutch landscape, portrait and genre painter; associated with the Düsseldorfer Malerschule and the Haagse School.

== Biography ==
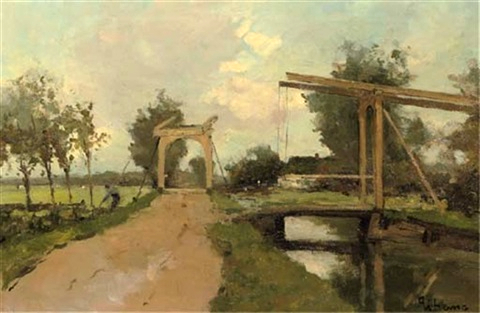
Two Drawbridges near Kortenhoef

He was the eldest of four children born to Coenraad Ritsema (1834–1916), a printer who had trained as a lithographer in Düsseldorf, and his wife, Jeanette, née Moulijn, originally from Rotterdam. His brother, Johan, was sent to Paris to be a lithographer's apprentice, while he went to Düsseldorf at the age of fifteen, to enroll at the Kunstakademie. He was there from 1884 to 1887. His primary instructors were Heinrich Lauenstein, Hugo Crola, Johann Peter Theodor Janssen and Adolf Schill. After completing his courses, he went to Scheveningen to study with Paul Gabriël, his father's childhood friend, who took him into his family. While there, he met his future wife, Alijda van den Broeck, the daughter of a baker from Kortenhoef. When he left, he lived in several locations, until 1900, when he opened a studio in Haarlem. After winning the Willink van Collenprijs in 1911, he married Alidja. They had a son and a daughter, and lived in The Hague until 1922.

He took some students and was a member of numerous artists' organizations, such as the Kunstenaarsvereniging Sint Lucas and Arti et Amicitiae, in Amsterdam, as well as the Haagse Kunstkring and the Pulchri Studio. In 1938, he and Alidja moved to Laren. She died later that same year. He died suddenly, after returning from a painting expedition, five years later.

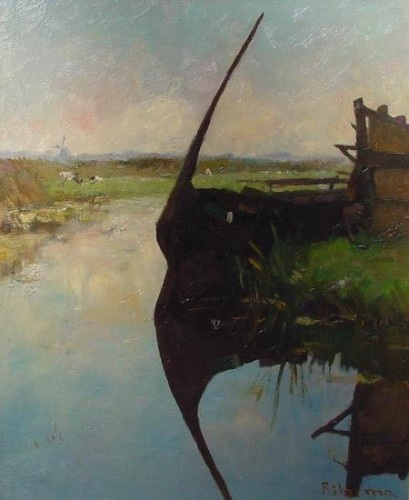
Reflection

Landscapes comprise most of his work, although he also created portraits and still-lifes. Queen Wilhelmina bought two of his landscapes; currently on display at Soestdijk Palace. His works may also be seen at the Kunstmuseum Den Haag and the Stedelijk Museum Amsterdam. His sister, Coba, became a famous portrait painter.
