= Moritz Leiffmann =

German banker and art collector

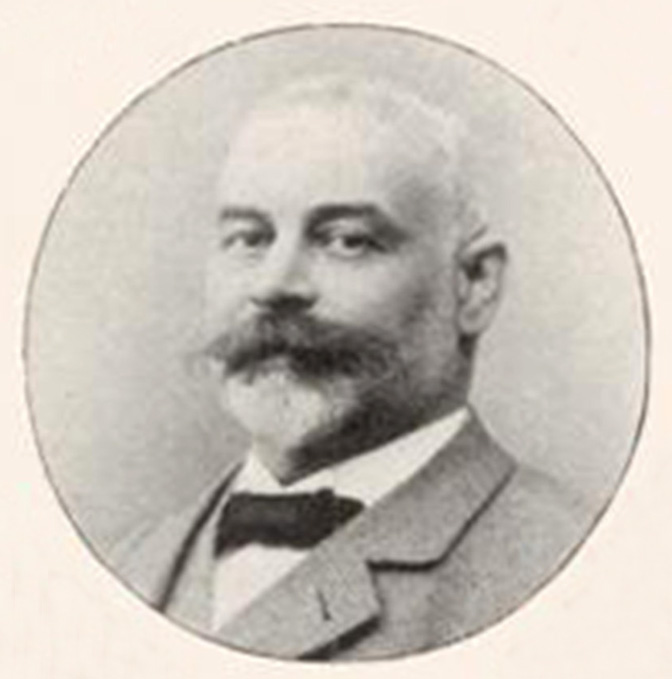
Moritz Leiffmann

Moritz Leiffmann (2 February 1853 – 29 May 1921) was a German private banker, local politician, writer and art collector.

== Life ==
Born in Unna, Leiffmann was the son of a Jewish saddler in the Westphalian Unna. He experienced social advancement as an authorised signatory (until 1888) and as a personally liable partner (until 1921) of the Düsseldorf banking house Bernhard Simons & Cie.founded on 13 October 1881, which participated intensively in the development of the industrial centres on the Rhine and Ruhr by financing industrial projects and companies. The development of the bank into an important financial institution is primarily regarded as Leiffmann's work. Through his involvement in the local politics of the city of Düsseldorf, where he served as a liberal city councillor, he contributed significantly to the economic and industrial development of the city, which became the "Schreibtisch des Ruhrgebiets". From 1915 to 1918, he represented Düsseldorf in the provincial Landtag of the Rhine Province. Also as a promoter of social and artistic projects (for example, in 1899 as an initiator of the Goethe Festival in Düsseldorf, as a sponsor of the Düsseldorf Mendelssohn monument erected in 1901, as a member of the Board of Directors and Head of the Finance Committee for the Internationale Kunst- und Gartenbau-Ausstellung Düsseldorf 1904 (among others in Kunstpalast Düsseldorf) and as donor of an inscription to the Nail Men erected in 1916 as a "war landmark" and the wooden sculpture Bergischer Löwe by Johannes Knubel, as a speaker and writer on economic and financial topics and as a poet and librettist of some works by Engelbert Humperdinck. Unlike Michael Simons (1817–1895), his senior partner in the bank, who played a significant role in the Synagogue community of Düsseldorf, Leiffmann - like many other representatives of the upper middle class - moved away from his Jewish religious roots, although he himself continued to belong to the Israelite religious community. Leiffmann married Fanny Kaiser (1859-1932). His children, including Martha Leiffmann, born in 1874, who married doctor Peter Janssen in 1904. married and gave birth to the later painter Peter Janssen in 1906, he was baptised Protestant. In 1910, he was awarded the title Kommerzienrat.

=== Villa Leiffmann ===
At the turn of the century, the family gave up their rather modest domicile above the business premises of the banking house Bernhard Simons & Cie. (later B. Simons & Co.) in Düsseldorf city centre (Blumenstraße 19) and moved into the stately "Villa Leiffmann", which was built in 1898 on the model of a Florentine Villa by the eclecticist Academy professor Adolf Schill and was built in the Golzheim district on a spacious site, between today's Theodor Heuss-Bridge, today's Nordpark Düsseldorf, Kaiserswerther Straße and the Rhine. The palatial villa surrounded by a park with curved paths, facing the Rhine with an imposing double tower façade, formed a "centre of glittering conviviality" until Leiffmann's death and was famous for its valuable furnishings, including a considerable art collection, which from November 1932, shortly after the death of Leiffmann's widow, was acquired by the gallerists Alfred Flechtheim, Hugo Helbing and Georg Paffrath by public auction. A few years before her death, probably in the mid-1920s, Fanny Leiffmann had given her son-in-law, doctor Peter Janssen, a plot of her villa property on the Rotterdamer Straße 40 (during the National Socialist era Alte Garde Ufer 104, today Rotterdamer Straße 65), where Janssen had his own residential building built in 1926 by the architect Josef Kleesattel, which is now a listed building. During the transformation of the north of Düsseldorf into the "Schlageter City", which the city and the Gauleitung Düsseldorf in the mid-1930s in the course of a personality cult around the Freikorp fighter Albert Leo Schlageter and an ambitious urban development policy to expand the "Gauhauptstadt Düsseldorf", the city acquired the villa site from Leiffmann's heirs for a very low purchase price in order to incorporate it into the development of the Reichsausstellung Schaffendes Volk and - within this urban development framework - into the construction of the national socialist model settlement called "Schlageter-Siedlung" (today "Siedlung Golzheim"); Villa Leiffmann, which had been vacant since 1932, was demolished in 1936 at the latest. A wrought-iron garden gate grille from the villa, which had been acquired by the writer Herbert Eulenberg, was reused at the entrance to his estate "Haus Freiheit" in Düsseldorf-Kaiserswerth.

=== Gravesite ===
Leiffmann died in Düsseldorf at age 68 and his wife was buried in the Jewish part of the Düsseldorf Nordfriedhof. The gravesite is marked by a simple tufa gravestone, probably designed by the sculptor Leopold Fleischhacker.

== Publications ==
- Johannes. Idyll in Hexametern, Versepos, 1878, 2nd edition, Leipzig 1879
- Gold-Silber-Papier. Eine Studie. 3rd edition, Lintz, Düsseldorf 1893
- Trifolium. Verlag Breitkopf & Härtel, Leipzig 1898 (lyrical poem, set to music by Engelbert Humperdinck, illustrated with symbolic drawings by Alexander Frenz; reviewed by Hanns Heinz Ewers in Der Kunstfreund, February 1899, p. 42 f.)
- Kräfte und Pflichten des deutschen Geldmarktes im Kriegsfalle. Ein Mahnruf. Düsseldorf 1899
- Zu den Wundern Amerikas. Reisebeschreibung. Schwann Verlag, Düsseldorf 1908
- Stellung und Aufgaben des Privatbankiers im heutigen Wirtschaftsleben. Einleitender Vortrag zum 4. Allgemeinen Deutschen Bankiertag zu München am 17. September 1912, Verlag Strucken, Düsseldorf 1912; ebenfalls in Verhandlungen des IV. Allgemeinen Deutschen Bankiertages zu München am 17. September 1912, Berlin 1912, p. 51 (PDF, Numerized)
- Die Städte und der Krieg. In Bank-Archiv, 14, 8, pp. 134–136
- Die Aufgaben der Gemeinden im Kriegsfalle. In Akademie für kommunale Verwaltung (ed.): Vorträge der Kommunalen Woche. Düsseldorf 1914, pp. 106–112 (Dieser Vortrag Leiffmanns, der zur finanziellen und sonstigen Vorsorge der Kommunen für einen Kriegsfall aufrief, fand im Juli 1914, kurz nach der Assassination of Archduke Franz Ferdinand und kurz vor Ausbruch des Erster Weltkrieg, überregionale Beachtung.)
- Die feste Sicherung unserer Kriegsanleihen. In Bank-Archiv, 1917
