= Lewis Edward Herzog =

American painter

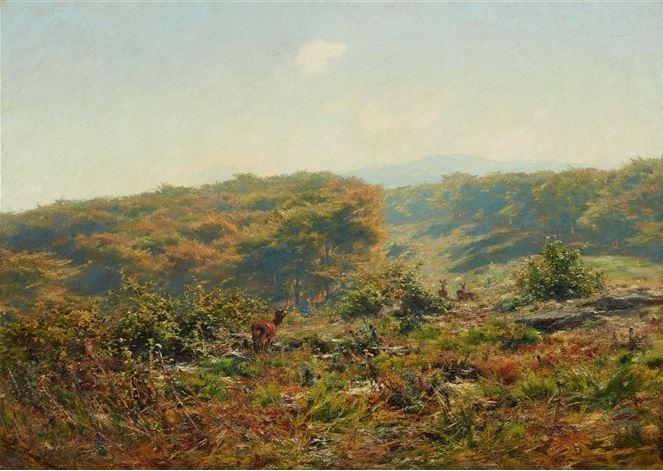
Landscape with Deer in the Morning Mist

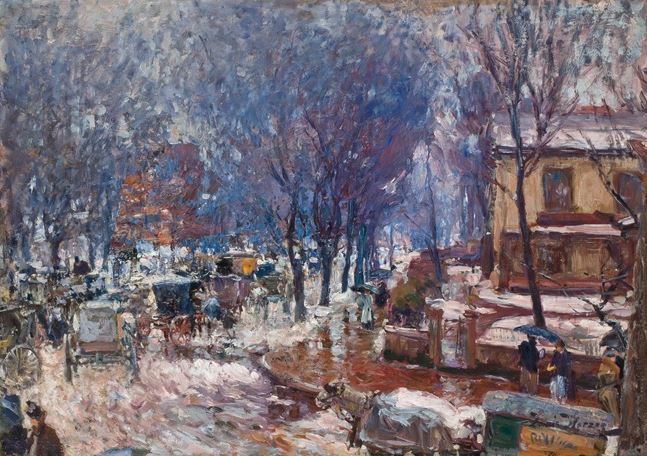
The City in Winter

Lewis Edward Herzog (15 October 1870, Ludenberg, Düsseldorf – 27 May 1943, Washington, D.C.) was an American landscape painter, associated with the Düsseldorfer Malerschule.

== Life and work ==
His father, Hermann Ottomar Herzog, was a well known German-American landscape painter, originally from Bremen, who moved his family to Philadelphia after Lewis's birth.

Lewis Herzog travelled extensively, visiting London, Rome, Berlin and Munich, until 1888, when he enrolled at the Kunstakademie Düsseldorf. There, he studied with Heinrich Lauenstein, Adolf Schill, Hugo Crola, Johann Peter Theodor Janssen and the engraver, Carl Ernst Forberg. From 1891 to 1893, he was in the master landscape class of Eugen Dücker. Upon graduating, he took a long study trip to Venice with his friend, Alfred Sohn-Rethel. In 1897, he participated in the Venice Biennale. Unlike his father, whose landscapes largely remained in the classical Dusseldorf and Hudson River School tradition, Lewis incorporated a more impressionist style.

Back in the United States, in 1898, Lewis held an exhibition of his European paintings at the Pennsylvania Academy of the Fine Arts. That same year, he was commissioned by Harper’s Magazine to paint scenes from the Spanish-American War. In 1904, his paintings were awarded a bronze medal at the Louisiana Purchase Exposition in St. Louis.

After 1905 he and his family lived on North Haven Island in Penobscot Bay. During World War I, he worked for the US Navy camouflage unit. He continued to exhibit frequently throughout the 1920s.

He died in Washington, while on a train trip home from Quantico, Virginia.
