= Peter Philippi =

German portrait painter

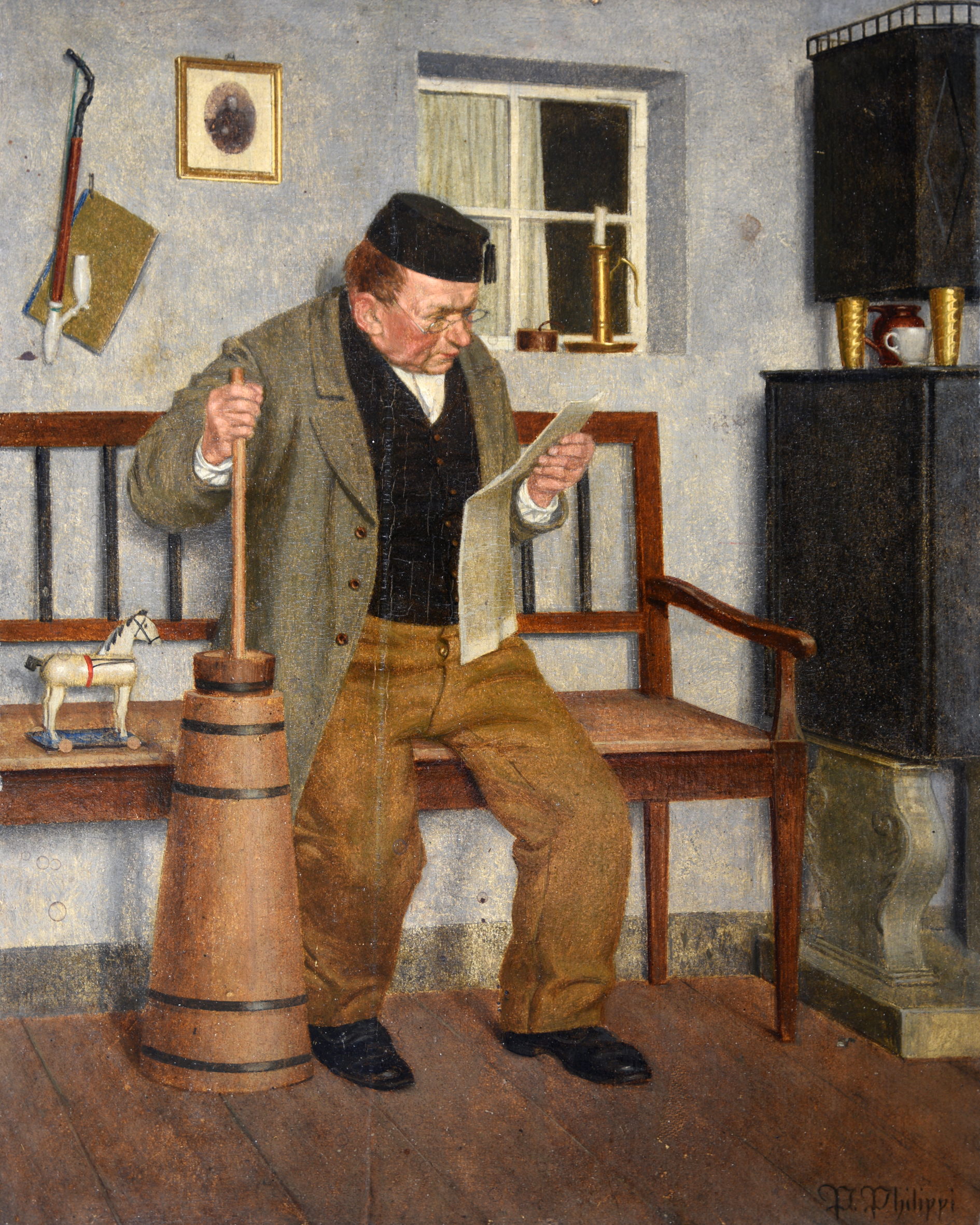
A Farmer Reading the News

Peter Philippi (30 March 1866 – 17 August 1945) was a German portrait and genre painter. Some sources, mostly art dealerships, give his year of death as 1958.

== Biography ==
He was born in Trier. His father, also named Peter Philippi, was a book seller and binder. His mother, Katharina née Theisen, was a winemaker's daughter from the Mosel region. In 1869, his father acquired a large, popular bookstore, which enabled Peter to attend the Royal Gymnasium. Upon graduating, in 1883, he left home to enroll at the Kunstakademie Düsseldorf. There is no record of any artistic training up to that time.

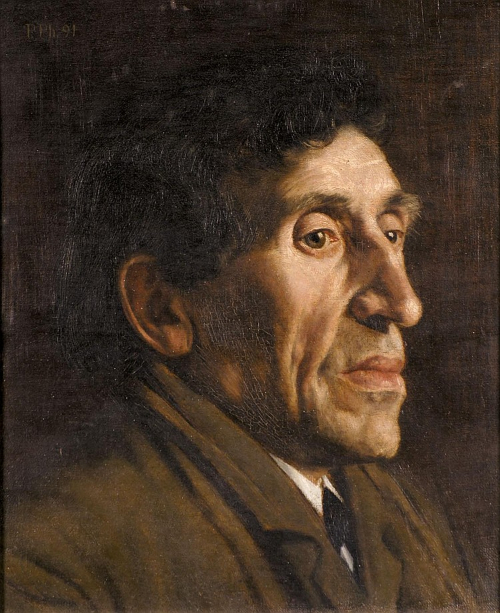
Portrait of an unidentified man

He studied there from 1884 to 1898, with a one-year interruption for military service. His primary instructors included Hugo Crola, Adolf Schill and Johann Peter Theodor Janssen. Later, he was accepted into the master class of the history painter, Eduard von Gebhardt, who was inclined to religious subject matter, but this had no influence on him. With graduation approaching, he joined the progressive artists' association, Malkasten. He remained in Düsseldorf, but maintained close contact with Trier. In 1905, he married a former fellow-student, Constanze Schmitz, originally from Berlin. They had one daughter.

Seeking an "unspoiled environment", he and Constanze moved to Rothenburg ob der Tauber in 1906. The first portfolio of his artwork was published shortly after. In 1910, he was named an extraordinary member of the Kunstakademie.

In 1923, together with Adolph Hosse and several younger, local artists, he helped establish the Rothenburger Künstlerbund, for which the city provided a permanent exhibition space. That same year, having divorced Constanze, he married Elisabeth Pies, from Trier. In 1930, he helped create a similar artists' association there. After the Nazi takeover in 1933, he was admitted to the Reich Chamber of Culture.

He remained conservative in his approach, calling the Biedermeier period "our last real stylistic epoch". His preferred subjects were elderly, small town people, in old-fashioned clothes. Many of his paintings, or portions of them, were reproduced as popular postcards. He participated in the Große Deutsche Kunstausstellung of 1937, which inspired him to publish The Little Town and Its People, a collection of his works that also featured his poetry and anecdotes about his models. He was represented in a total of 48 exhibits between then and 1943.

On his seventy-fifth birthday, in 1941, he was presented with the Goethe-Medaille für Kunst und Wissenschaft, and deemed to be "politically reliable". Two years later, he was honored with his own exhibition. In 1944, he was added to the "Gottbegnadeten list" of painters who were crucial to Nazi culture. He died in 1945 in Rothenburg ob der Tauber.

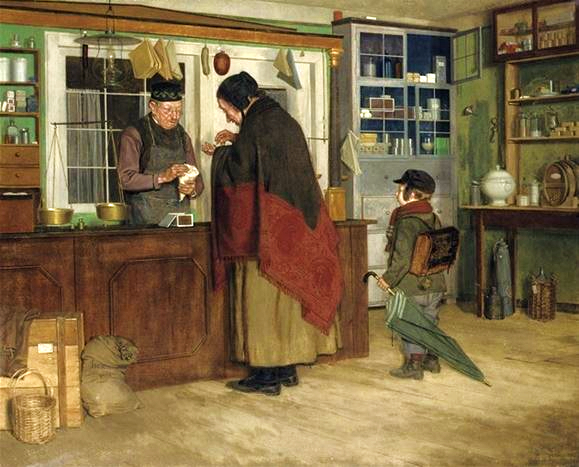
At the Grocery Store
