= Julius Geertz =

German painter (1837–1902)

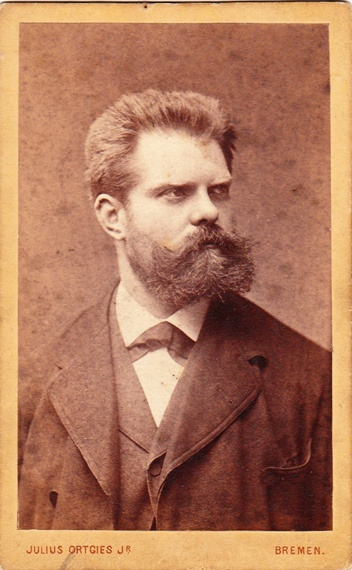
Julius Geertz 1878

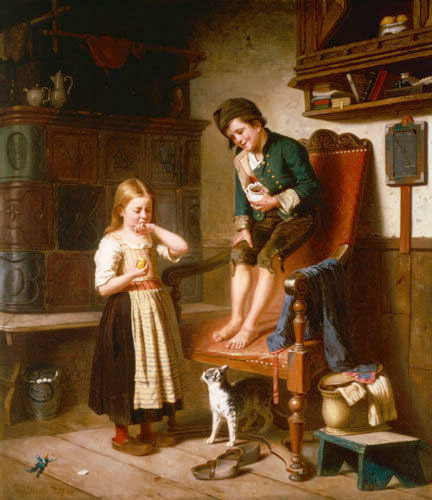
Die saure Zitrone, 1867

Julius Geertz (21 April 1837 – 21 October 1902) was a German artist of the Düsseldorf school of painting.

== Biography ==
Geertz was born in Hamburg where he began his artistic studies under the brothers Günther Gensler and Martin Gensler, then worked for some time as a private student of the former, after which he became a pupil of Adolf des Coudres in Karlsruhe. He moved to Düsseldorf in 1860 and entered the studio of Rudolf Jordan. In 1864 he travelled to Paris, where he studied the work of the old masters, and afterwards to Brittany and the Netherlands.

He then settled in Düsseldorf, where he painted genre scenes, partly serious, partly humorous, taken from ordinary life and the doings of young people; among these Der Verbrecher nach der Verurteilung ("The Criminal after the Judgement") established his reputation. He is counted as one of the so-called Düsseldorf School.

His works are distinguished by serious effort to capture the truth to life of individual character, excellent drawing and telling use of colour, as well as a frequent use of subtle humour. He was a member of the Düsseldorf painters' society Malkasten ("paintbox").

Geertz died in Braunschweig.

His son Henry Ludwig Geertz (born 1872 in Düsseldorf; date and place of death unknown) studied from 1889 at the Kunstakademie Düsseldorf with Peter Janssen, and from 1893 in the painting classes of Julius Roeting and Eduard von Gebhardt. He was a member of the Hamburger Künstlerverein ("Hamburg Artists' Society"). Among his major works is the group portrait of the founding members of the Hamburgische Wissenschaftliche Stiftung ("Hamburg Scientific Society").

== Selected works ==
- Zerniert und Kapituliert
- Zwei heitere Kinderbilder
- Folgen des Schularrestes
- Der Fliegenfänger
- Die Dorfschule
- Wacht am Rhein
- Kriegsgefangene
- Das Mädchen mit dem Vogelnest
- Der Bettelpfennig

== Sources ==
- Gitta Ho, 2015: Geertz, Julius in Savoy, Bénédicte und Nerlich, France (ed.): Pariser Lehrjahre. Ein Lexikon zur Ausbildung deutscher Maler in der französischen Hauptstadt. Band 2: 1844–1870.
