= Robert Weise =

German painter

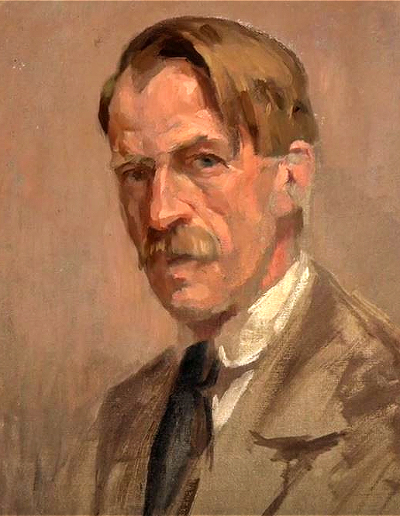
Self-portrait (date unknown)

Robert Weise (2 April 1870 in Stuttgart – 5 November 1923 in Starnberg) was a German painter, of landscapes and portraits, and an illustrator. His works were influenced by French Impressionism.

== Biography ==
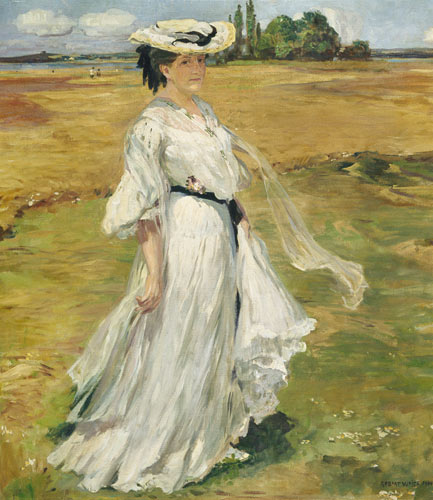
A Young Woman at Lake Constance

He had originally planned to pursue a career in the military, but was discharged in 1888, due to an illness. As a result, he turned to painting; taking private lessons from Hermann Drück at the State Academy of Fine Arts Stuttgart. In 1889, he transferred to the Kunstakademie Düsseldorf, where he studied with Heinrich Lauenstein, Hugo Crola, Adolf Schill, and Arthur Kampf. During the winter months of 1892 and 1893, he went to Paris, where he attended the Académie Julian. His primary instructors there were Jean-Joseph Benjamin-Constant and William-Adolphe Bouguereau

In 1896, after travelling throughout Belgium, Holland, Italy and Spain, he settled in Munich, where he made friends with the staff members of Jugend, a progressive art magazine. Its founder, Georg Hirth, was known to be a strong supporter of young artists, and provided them with numerous commissions. In 1899, he was part of a group that established an artists' association called "Die Scholle", an agricultural term that often means "homeland", but they denied any patriotic intent.

After 1900, he spent several months a year in Wartenberg, where he opened a studio with a small house. In 1901, the Munich Secession set up a special exhibition area for the members of Scholle.

That same year, he decided to abandon city life altogether and moved to an area near Lake Constance, with his wife Walburga and daughter Gertraud. For the next five years, they lived in Gottlieben, on the Swiss side of the Untersee, in a house they rented from an artist named Mathilde von Zúylen-Ammann. Their son Kurt was born there. Until 1904, many of his works were published in Die Rheinlande, a cultural magazine edited by his friend, Wilhelm Schäfer.

In 1906, he received an invitation from the Württembergische Kunstfreunde, offering him his own studio in Stuttgart, with an annual salary, no obligations, and an opportunity to exhibit frequently. He accepted the offer, returned to Stuttgart, and was named a professor in 1911. Three years later, he was appointed to the Grand-Ducal Saxon Art School, Weimar, where he remained during World War I. After the war, he moved to Starnberg, where he died in 1923.

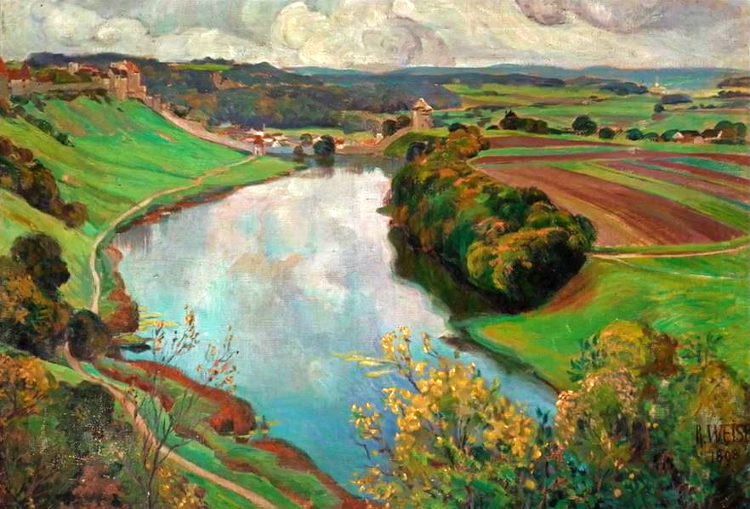
View of Burghausen
