= Lore Uphoff-Schill =

German painter (1890–1968)

Lore Uphoff-Schill (August 18, 1890 – Düsseldorf as Leonore Henriette Schill, January 28, 1968 – Worpswede) was a German painter of the Düsseldorfer Schule and the Worpswede painters' colony.

== Life ==
Lore Schill was born in 1890 as the fourth child of the Düsseldorf art professor Adolf Schill and his wife Emmy Simons (* 1858). His birthplace was Blumenstraße in Düsseldorf. On her mother's side, she came from the Simons-Köhler family from Elberfeld (see Friedrich Wilhelm Simons-Köhler; Walter Simons; Ludwig Simons). The architect Walter Kyllmann (Kyllmann and Heyden) was an uncle of Lore. Her great-grandfather was the district administrator of Solingen and art patron Carl Gottlieb Kyllman.

In addition to her father, Lore Uphoff-Schill received instruction in painting from Lothar von Kunowski at the Kunstgewerbeschule Düsseldorf. In 1913, she and her husband Fritz Uphoff began to devote themselves to figurative representation in the studio they rented in Düsseldorf. She mainly created poetic, miniature-like fairy tale paintings. After moving to Worpswede, she turned to landscape painting. She also took her easel to the surrounding villages and created unique paintings in oil and a special spray technique depicting the moorland landscape around Worpswede. The pastel and oil paintings in which she atmospherically depicted farms, moorland paths and barns are impressive.

During the economically difficult 1920s, Lore Uphoff was involved in the work of the "Werkgemeinschaft Worpswede für Buchkunst, gestochene Buch- und Mappenwerke" (Worpswede Association for Book Art, Engraved Book and Portfolio Works) founded by Fritz and his brother Carl Emil Uphoff. Due to a serious leg ailment, she had to give up her landscape painting in 1940. From this time onwards, she mainly painted and drew still lifes of flowers.

In 1928, the Provinzialmuseum Hannover acquired 10 paintings by Worpswede artists, including Emmy Meyer, Martha Vogeler, Lore Uphoff-Schill and Carl Emil Uphoff. Two drawings by Lore Uphoff are kept by the Sprengel Museum in Hanover.

== Writings ==
- Adolf Schill. Memories of my father. In: Jahrbuch der Arbeitsgemeinschaft der Rheinischen Geschichtsvereine, Volume 3, published by August Bagel, Düsseldorf 1937.

== Literature ==
- Uphoff-Schill, Lore. In: Ulrich Thieme, Felix Becker, Fred. C. Willis, Hans Vollmer (Hrsg.): Allgemeines Lexikon der Bildenden Künstler von der Antike bis zur Gegenwart. Begründet von Ulrich Thieme und Felix Becker. 37 Bände. (1907–1950, Band 1 bis 15 online einsehbar). Wilhelm Engelmann, E. A. Seemann, Leipzig.
- Uphoff-Schill, Lore. In: Hans Vollmer (Hrsg.): Allgemeines Lexikon der bildenden Künstler des XX. Jahrhunderts. 6 Bände. E. A. Seemann, Leipzig.
- Uphoff-Schill (née Schill), Lore. In: Hans Paffrath / Kunstmuseum Düsseldorf (ed.): Lexikon der Düsseldorfer Malerschule. Volume 3. F. Bruckmann, Munich 1998, ISBN 3-7654-3011-0, Appendix, p. 472.
- Westermanns Monatshefte. Illustrated German magazine (1936/1937): Illustration pp. 167-170.
- Velhagen & Klasings Monatshefte. 60, Leipzig 1952, p. 568 (color illustration).
- Carl Emil, Fritz and Lore Uphoff: Die Uphoffs: Worpswede 1910-1971. Schmalfeldt, Bremen 1975 (illustrations).
