= Friedrich Klein-Chevalier =

German painter

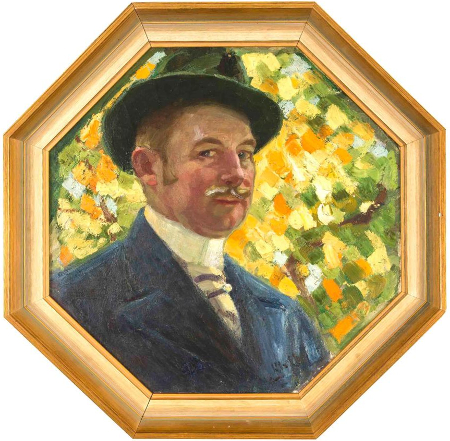
Self-portrait (date unknown)

Friedrich Klein-Chevalier (18 June 1861, Düsseldorf - 14 March 1938, Wiesbaden) was a German history and portrait painter, associated with the Düsseldorfer Malerschule.

== Biography ==
His father was a military officer. From 1884 to 1886, he attended the Kunstakademie Düsseldorf, where he studied with the history painter, Johann Peter Theodor Janssen, then with the architect Adolf Schill, who taught him decorative painting. He soon received commissions for panel paintings, theater curtains and similar venues, which brought him recognition for his historical works .

In 1892, he entered a competition for a mural in the council chamber of the Düsseldorf Town Hall. His entry, an historical scene featuring Johann Wilhelm, Elector Palatine, came in second. Between 1894 and 1899, he was allowed to paint it on the wall of a hallway.

In 1893/94, before beginning his mural, he spent some time in Rome, where he was influenced by the works of Raphael and Michelangelo. A trip to New York in 1897 established his reputation as a portraitist, which resulted in numerous commissions from the nobility and upper-classes when he returned to Germany.

He married Else Levinstein (1879–1939), the daughter of Jewish industrialist, in 1901. Shortly after, they moved to Berlin. They had three children. There, he increasingly devoted himself to painting en plein aire; making several trips to the North Sea. In 1907, he acquired a small villa near Florence.

The collapse of the monarchy at the end of World War I brought a decrease in commissions and a serious economic decline. After 1920, he lived in Goslar, where he received his last major commission in 1923; for the city's millennial celebrations. He lived in Florence for several years; painting monumental pictures of flowers. In 1935 he went back to Germany, and died three years later in Wiesbaden. Else died the following year, not long before she was due to be "deported" to a death camp by the Nazi régime. The rest of his family survived. His grandson, Michael Chevalier, became a well known voice actor.

== Selected paintings ==
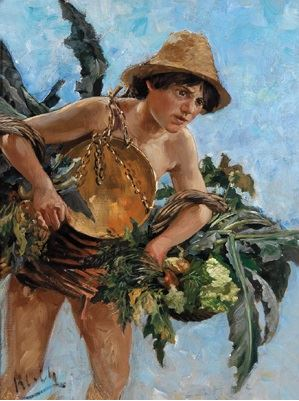
Italian Farm Boy on His Way to Market

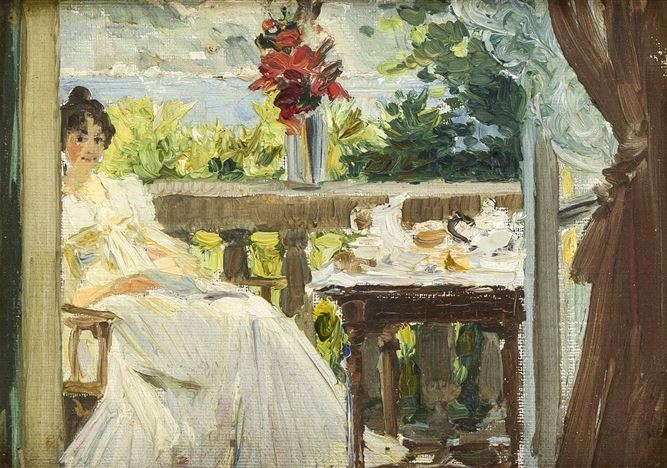
Lady on a Balcony

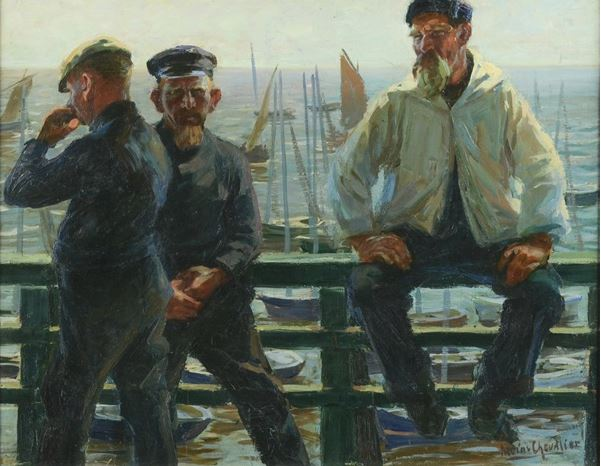
Sailors

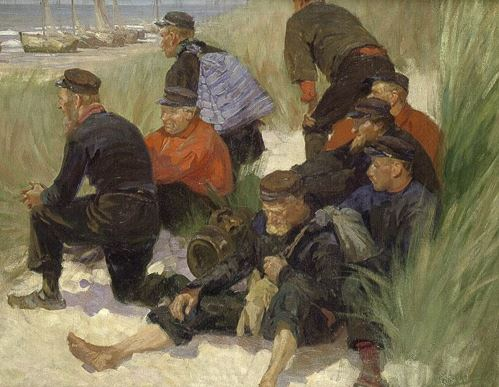
Fishermen on a North Sea Beach

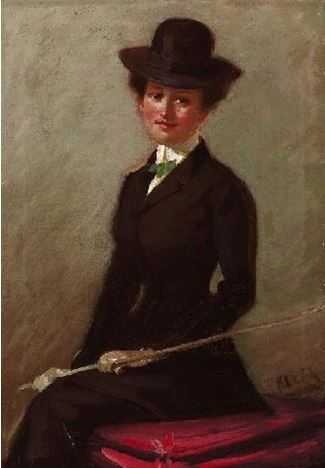
Lady in a Riding Costume
