= Hermann Ottomar Herzog =

German-American painter

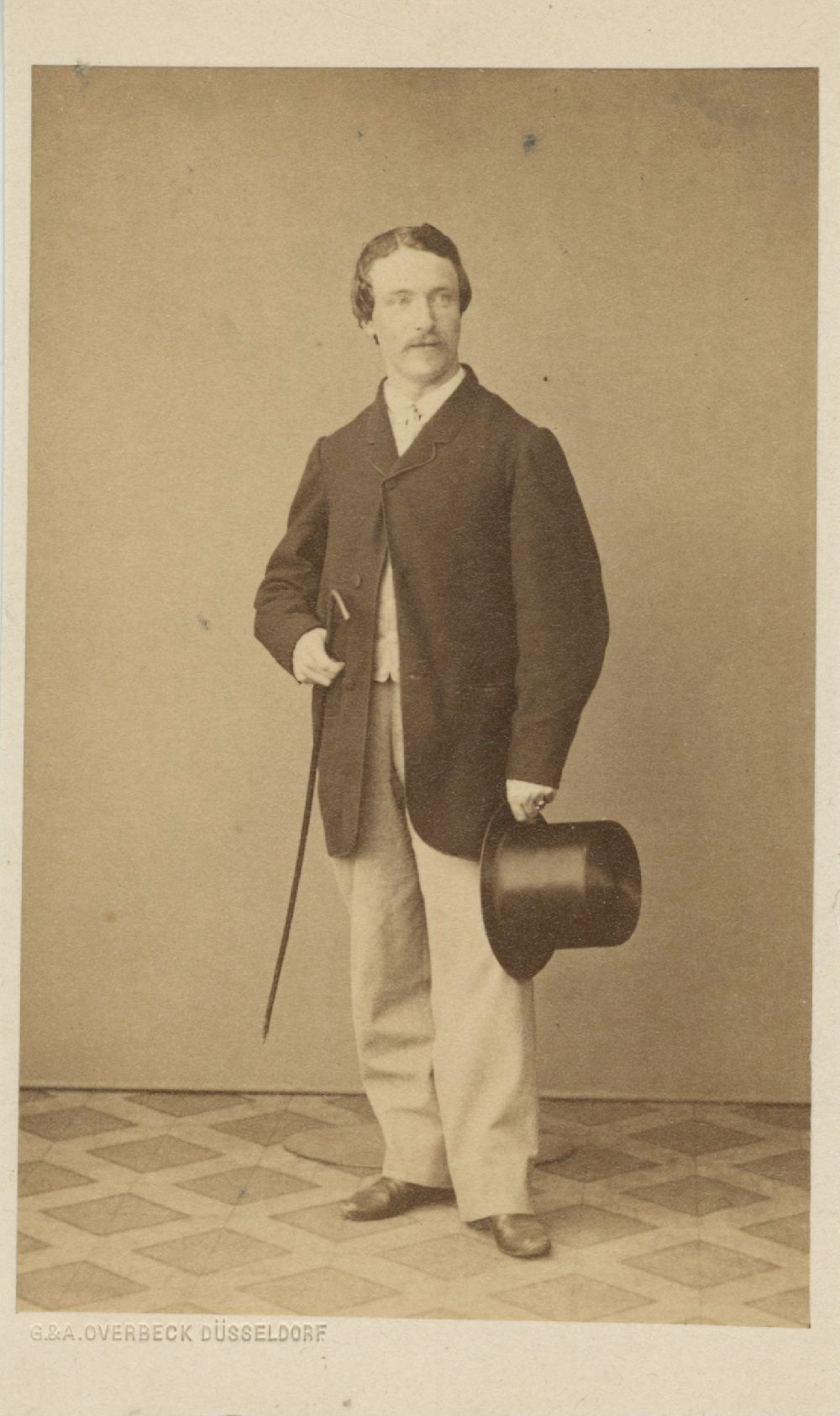
Hermann Herzog by G. & A. Overbeck (firm), c. 1868

Hermann Ottomar Herzog (November 16, 1832-February 6, 1932) He is associated with the Düsseldorf School and Hudson River School of painting. He almost always signed his work "H. Herzog"; as a result of this and the Americanization of spelling "Herman," his first name is spelled both "Herman" and "Hermann" in various sources. "Hermann," however, is the way he signed his name on documents.

== Life and work ==
Herzog was born in Bremen, Germany and entered the Düsseldorf Academy at age seventeen, studying in the classroom with several academy artists, such as J.W. Schirmer and Rudolph Wiegmann, and taking private lessons with Andreas Achenbach, C. F. Lessing, and the Norwegian artist, Hans Gude. After traveling and painting in Norway, he achieved early commercial success. Patrons included royalty and nobility throughout Europe.

In 1871 Herzog immigrated to the U.S., declaring his intent for naturalization at the Philadelphia Court of Common Pleas on August 14 of that year. After traveling extensively throughout the US, including California in 1873 and in Mexico, and becoming an American citizen in 1876, he returned to Germany, brought his family back with him in 1877, and settled permanently in West Philadelphia Philadelphia in the United States. Herzog received an award at the 1876 Philadelphia Centennial Exhibition for “excellence in landscape painting” regarding his entry Sentinel Rock, Yosemite.. He later made extensive trips to Maine and especially Florida, where he wintered annually and painted over 300 works of its wilderness.

Because he was a successful investor, Herzog did not depend on the sale of his artwork to maintain a comfortable lifestyle. Following his death, his family retained a large group of his paintings, most of which were released to the art market in the 1970s. A number of prominent American and European museums now include Herzog's work as part of their collections.

Herzog's work is sometimes considered to be part of the Hudson River School, although it is more realistic and less over-dramatic than works by peers Frederic Edwin Church or Albert Bierstadt.

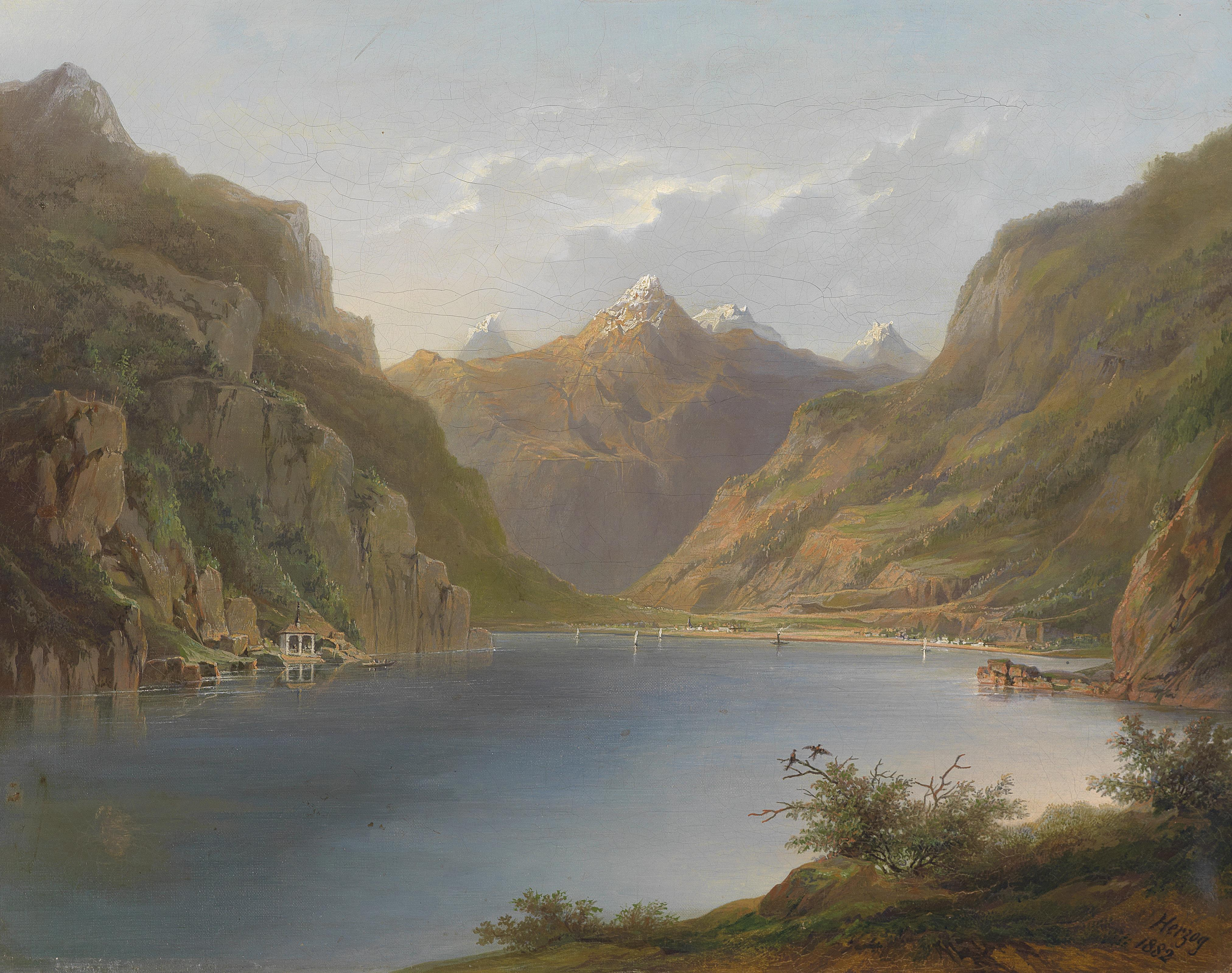
Lake Lucerne, 1882

The Brandywine River Museum in Chadds Ford, Pennsylvania held a major exhibition of Herzog's work in 1992 and published a catalog of his work, with an essay by art historian Donald S. Lewis, Jr. In July 2023, a limited edition biography of Hermann Herzog, Hermann Herzog: His Remarkable Life, Unrivaled Florida Work, and Rightful Place in American Art History by Edward Pollack and Deborah C. Pollack, was published. It corrects many inaccuracies about his life and emphasizes his extensive work in Florida.

In his long life, Herzog created many more than 1,000 paintings, including "Women in a Tropical Setting" and "Landscape with a Bear and her Cub". He died in Philadelphia, on February 6, 1932, at age ninety-nine. His son, Lewis Edward, also became a landscape painter of some note.

== See also ==
- List of Hudson River School artists

== Sources ==
- Pollack, Edward and Deborah C. Pollack, Hermann Herzog: His Remarkable Life, Unrivaled Florida Work, and Rightful Place in American Art History (Blue Heron Press, 2023).
- International Exhibition, Philadelphia, March 8, 1876, Report on Awards Citation
- Archives, Kunstakademie, Düsseldorf,
- Staatsarchiv Bremen

"Herzog, Hermann", In: Hans Vollmer (Ed.): Allgemeines Lexikon der Bildenden Künstler von der Antike bis zur Gegenwart, Vol.16: Hansen–Heubach. E. A. Seemann, Leipzig 1923, pg.570

- Peter Hastings Falk: Who was Who in American Art. Sound View, Madison 1985, ISBN 0-932087-00-0, pg.279
- "Herzog, Hermann". In: Kunstmuseum Düsseldorf, Galerie Paffrath: Lexikon der Düsseldorfer Malerschule 1819–1918. Vol.2: Haach–Murtfeldt, F. Bruckmann, Munich 1998, ISBN 3-7654-3010-2, pg.97 f.
