= August Deusser =

German painter (1870–1942)

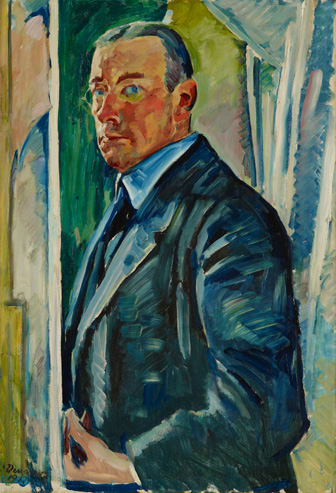
Self-portrait in Blue Jacket (c.1911)

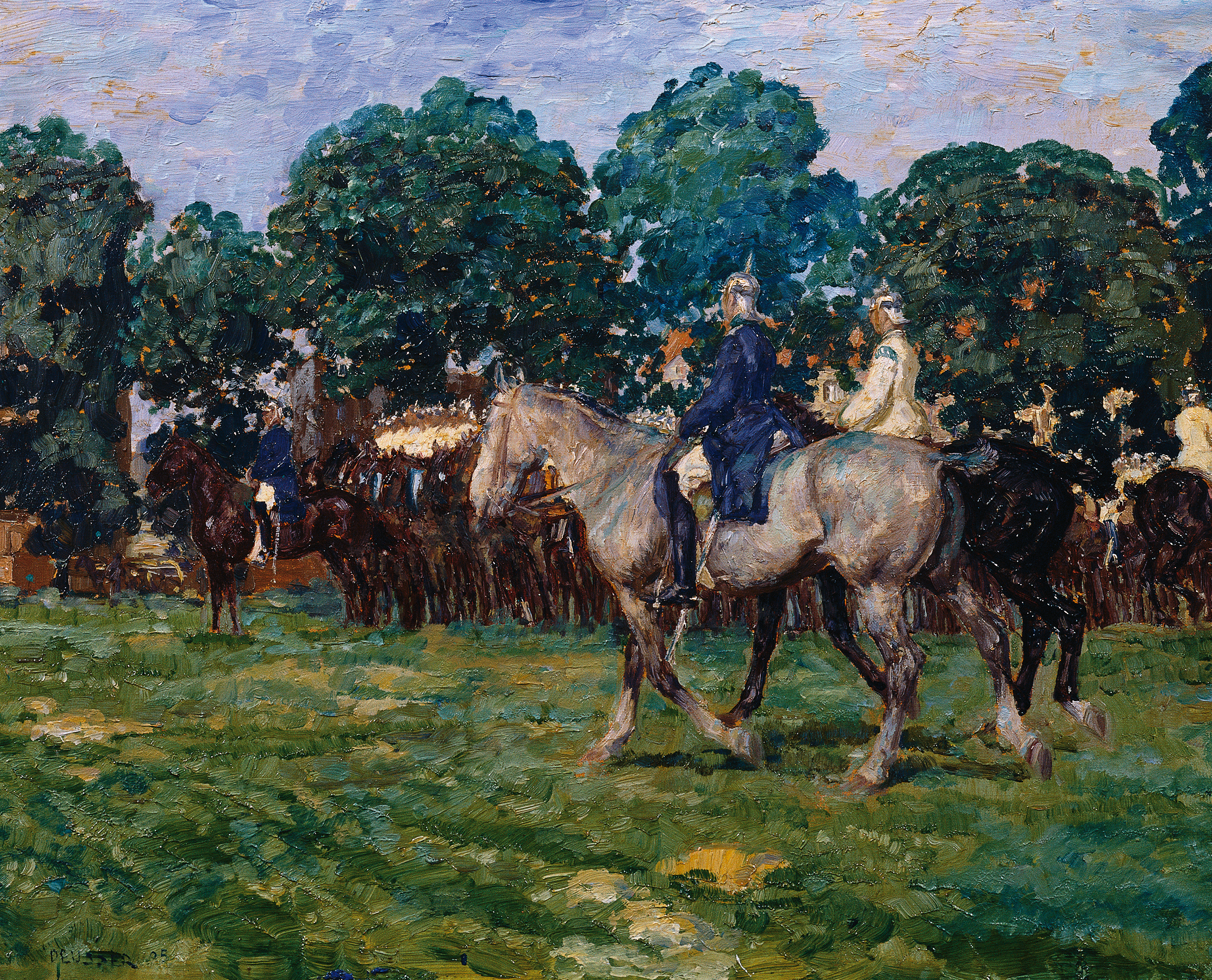
Cuirassiers (1905)

August Deusser (15 February 1870 – 28 October 1942) was a German painter and art professor, at the Kunstakademie Düsseldorf.

== Life and work ==
He was born in Cologne. From 1892 to 1897, he studied at the Kunstakademie Düsseldorf; finishing as a master student of Peter Janssen At first, he painted genre and historical works; with subjects ranging from farmers in the field, to scenes from Shakespeare. In one of his first successes, he won a competition for decorating the meeting room of the courthouse in Kleve; with a scene depicting the evening before the Battle of Kleverhamm.

Under the influence of Max Liebermann and Wilhelm Trübner, he became one of the first artists associated with the Düsseldorfer Malerschule to turn to Impressionism. His first works in that style involved studies done on the training grounds of the 8th Cuirassiers "Count Geßler" regiment, resulting in a series of oils depicting their activities, in a style that is sometimes known as German Impressionism. They received harshly negative reviews from the critics in Düsseldorf, so he withdrew to Monheim am Rhein. In 1908, he emerged to exhibit a series of horse portraits at the Alte Kunsthalle. On that occasion, he received positive reviews in the magazine, Die Rheinlande, from its publisher, the writer Wilhelm Schäfer.

In 1909, together with his friend, Max Clarenbach, and others, he co-founded the Sonderbund, a union of artists devoted to French Impressionism. They held major exhibitions in Düsseldorf (1911) and Cologne (1912). In that year, he moved to Wiesbaden. The organization was dissolved in 1916, during World War I. In 1917, he was appointed a professor at the Kunstakademie Düsseldorf. He taught and painted there until his retirement in 1932. He died at his home in Konstanz, ten years later.

Since 1972 his estate, the Deusser Foundation, has operated from Bad Zurzach in Switzerland. His home in Monheim am Rhein is now a museum.
