= Torsten Wasastjerna =

Finnish painter (1863–1924)

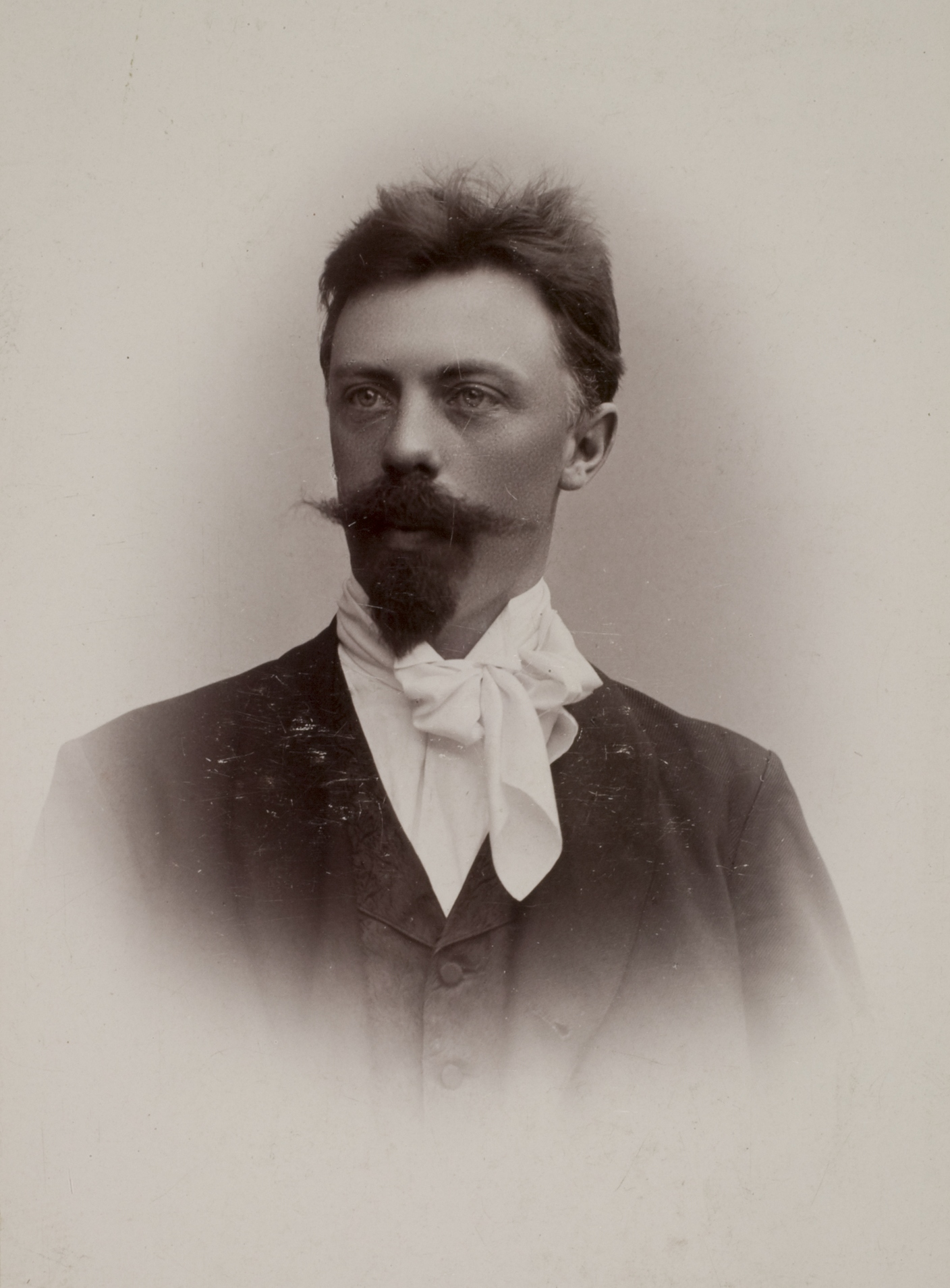
- Born: Torsten Gideon Wasastjerna; 17 December 1863; Helsinki, Grand Duchy of Finland
- Died: 1 July 1924 (aged 60); Helsinki, Finland

Torsten Gideon Wasastjerna (17 December 1863 – 1 July 1924) was a Finnish painter.

Wasastjerna started his studies in 1883 at the Academy of Fine Arts, Helsinki under Adolf von Becker, spent 1885 – 1888 in Düsseldorf and after that four winters in Paris. During his stay in Paris he painted a number of paintings distinguished by their use of colour, for example French Women Ironing (1889, Ateneum) which has clear impressionist influences. Similar pieces from this time are From Luxembourg Gardens and Place de la Concorde (1890). With the rise of symbolism in the 1890s Wasastjerna started painting bigger works, often focused on fairy tale motifs. His later output included prints, pastels and a number of portraits. He also turned his hand to writing, with a collection of poems, a play, and even a polemic entitled Art’s Friends and Enemies (1902).

A renewed assessment of Wasastjerna's work came with the 2022 exhibition Torsten Wasastjerna – A World of Fairy Tales and Fantasy at Villa Gyllenberg in Helsinki and an accompanying monograph by art historian Erkki Anttonen. The exhibition presented Wasastjerna as an important artist of the Golden Age of Finnish Art, best known for his innovative Impressionist paintings from around 1890, while drawing attention to his less studied large-scale Symbolist works based on fairy-tale and fantasy subjects.

Over 40 of Wasastjerna's works are included in the collections of the Finnish National Gallery, many of which on display at the Ateneum museum.
