= Willy Lucas =

German painter

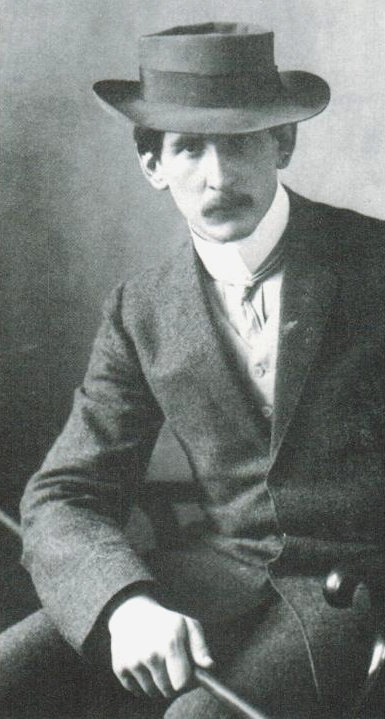
Willy Lucas (1907)

Wilhelm Lucas, known as Willy (20 February 1884 – 18 April 1918) was a German landscape and cityscape painter.

== Life and work ==
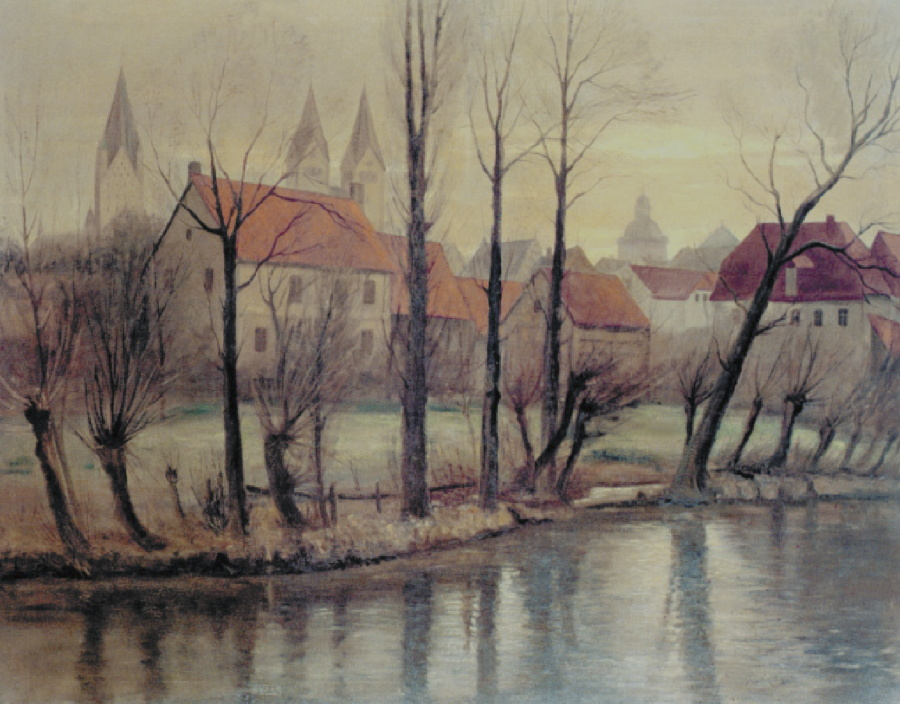
View of Paderborn

His ancestors worked as glass painters and stonemasons at Cologne Cathedral. His father was a contractor and architect. He spent his childhood in Paderborn, and attended the building trades school in Holzminden. Later, he worked as a carpenter's assistant at his father's business. In 1904, he began studying at the Kunstakademie Düsseldorf. After only two years, he dropped out of school and opened his own studio. He also became a member of the progressive artists' association, Malkasten.

He travelled throughout Europe to find motifs for his works. From 1912 to 1914, he and his wife visited France, Holland, Italy and Sweden. From Italy, they toured the Adriatic and the Riviera. She was the daughter of a wealthy entrepreneur, so they were financially independent, although their travels were mostly paid for by selling his paintings.

At the beginning of World War I, they were forced to leave France and return to Düsseldorf. While there, he had become heavily influenced by Impressionism and the works of Claude Monet. From that point on, the colors in his paintings brightened considerably, and light would come to play a more important role in his compositions.

After many years of intermittent poor health, he was diagnosed with tuberculosis. In 1917, he moved to Garmisch, seeking a cure. He died there in the Spring of 1918. Despite his short life, he was able to complete over 600 paintings and drawings. The largest collection is in his childhood home of Paderborn.

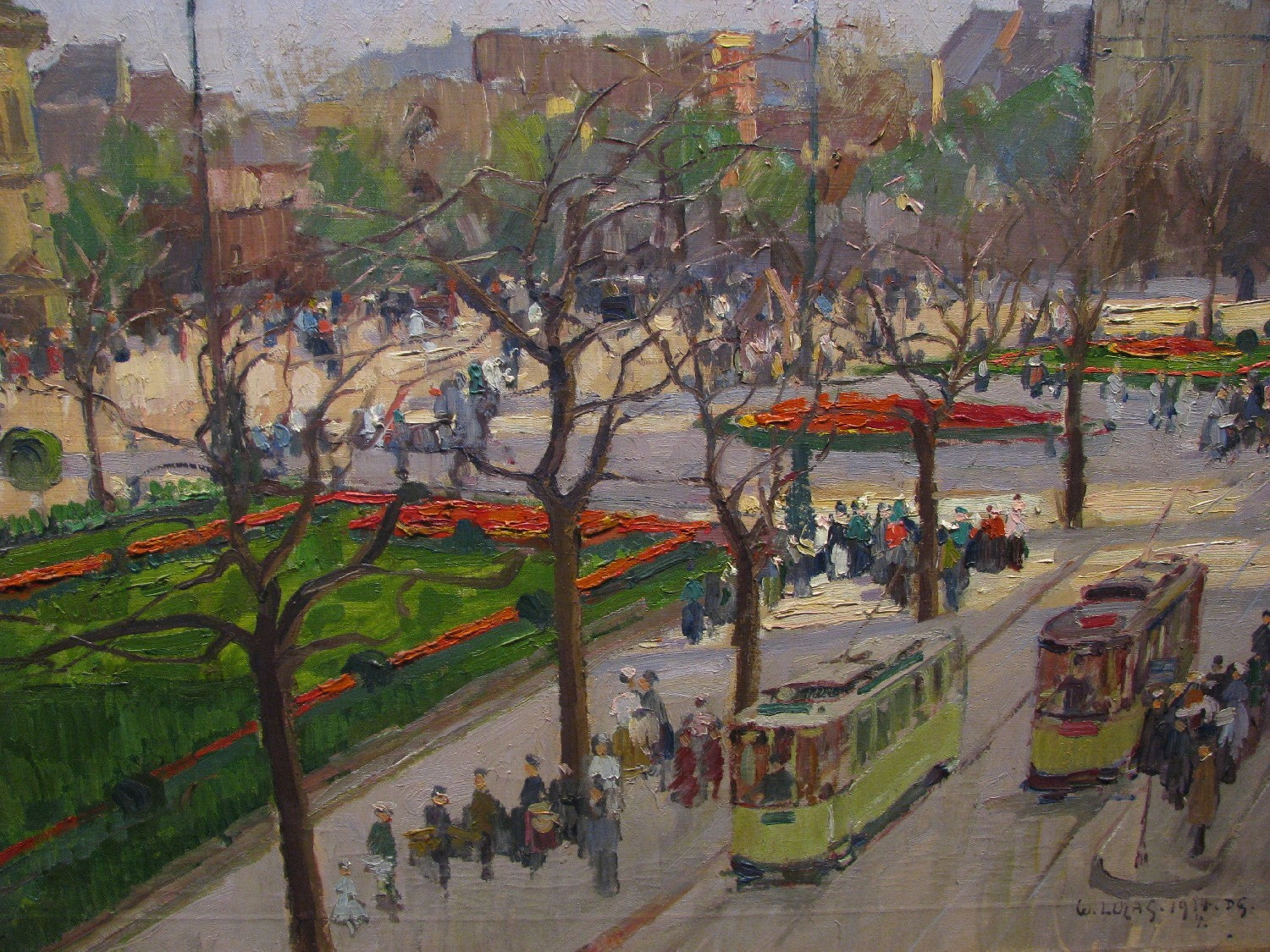
Wilhelmsplatz in Düsseldorf
