= Peter Janssen =

German painter

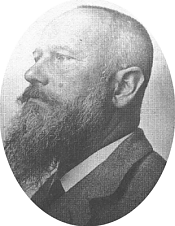
Portrait of Peter Janssen

Johann Peter Theodor Janssen (12 December 1844, Düsseldorf – 19 February 1908, Düsseldorf) was a German historical painter.

== Biography ==
Janssen was born in Düsseldorf, son of the engraver Tamme Weyert Theodor Janssen (1817–1894), by whom he was first instructed before studying at the Kunstakademie Düsseldorf under Karl Ferdinand Sohn and Eduard Bendemann. He is principally known through a series of decorative works whose monumental style and sound naturalism won him a reputation as one of the foremost historical painters of his time. He became a professor at the Kunstakademie Düsseldorf in 1877 and its director in 1895, and was elected a member of the Prussian Academy of Arts in 1885. In Berlin, he worked also for Emil Hünten.

He was the brother of sculptor Karl Janssen, whose works include the Kaiser Wilhelm Monument in Düsseldorf, and "Steinklopferin" ("Stonebreaking Woman"), which is owned by the Alte Nationalgalerie in Berlin.

Janssen's grandson Peter Tamme Weyert Janssen (1906 – 1979) was also a painter.

== Works ==
Janssen's significant murals include:

- "Colonisation der Ostsee-Provinzen durch die Hansa. 1201." ("Colonization of the Baltic Sea Provinces by the Hansa. 1201."), in the New Exchange in Bremen (1872)
- "Die Mythe des Prometheus" ("The Myth of Prometheus"), 11 (possibly 12) part mural sequence, in what was formerly named the "second Cornelius Room" (German: Cornelius-Saal) of the Alte Nationalgalerie in Berlin (1874 – 1876)
- Six large and three smaller murals of scenes from the history of Erfurt, in the Festsaal (ballroom) of the Erfurt City Hall (completed in 1882)
- A group of frieze and ceiling paintings: "Menschenleben" ("Human Life"), "Phantasie" ("Imagination"), "Schönheit" ("Beauty"), and "Natur" ("Nature"), in the Aula (auditorium) of the Kunstakademie Düsseldorf (1886 – 1896)
- Seven part mural sequence of scenes from the legend of Otto der Schütz (Otto the Archer) and the history of Marburg, in the Aula (auditorium) of the University of Marburg's Alte Universität (Old University) building (1895 – 1903)

Some of Janssen's significant oil paintings:

- "Die Verleugnung Petri" ("The Denial of Peter"), completed in 1869, (Note: "Die Folge war ein innerer Zwiespalt, unter welchem nicht allein seine erste grössere Schöpfung, die »Verleugnung Petri« (1865 im Carton, 1869 als Oelgemälde vollendet) litt") was once owned by the Pennsylvania Academy of the Fine Arts in Philadelphia.
- "Die Kindheit des Bacchus" ("The Childhood of Bacchus)", completed in 1882, (Note: "Wie weit er inzwischen in der Ausbildung des letzteren gediehen war, suchte er bald nach Vollendung dieser Wandgemälde in einem kolossalen Oelbilde zu zeigen, welches »die Kindheit des Bacchus« (1882) darstellt") was displayed at the "Internationalen Kunstausstellung" ("International Art Exhibition") held in Munich in 1883.
- "Walter Dodde und die bergischen Bauern bei der Schlacht bei Worringen" ("Walther Dodde and the Peasants of Berg at the Battle of Worringen"), completed in 1893, was first exhibited in the old art gallery in Düsseldorf, and is now displayed in the Düsseldorf City Hall. The New International Encyclopedia described it as "a composition of great dramatic power, containing many life-size figures". In 1893 it earned Janssen a "great gold medal" at the first Große Berliner Kunstausstellung (Great Berlin Art Exhibition).

=== Selected paintings ===
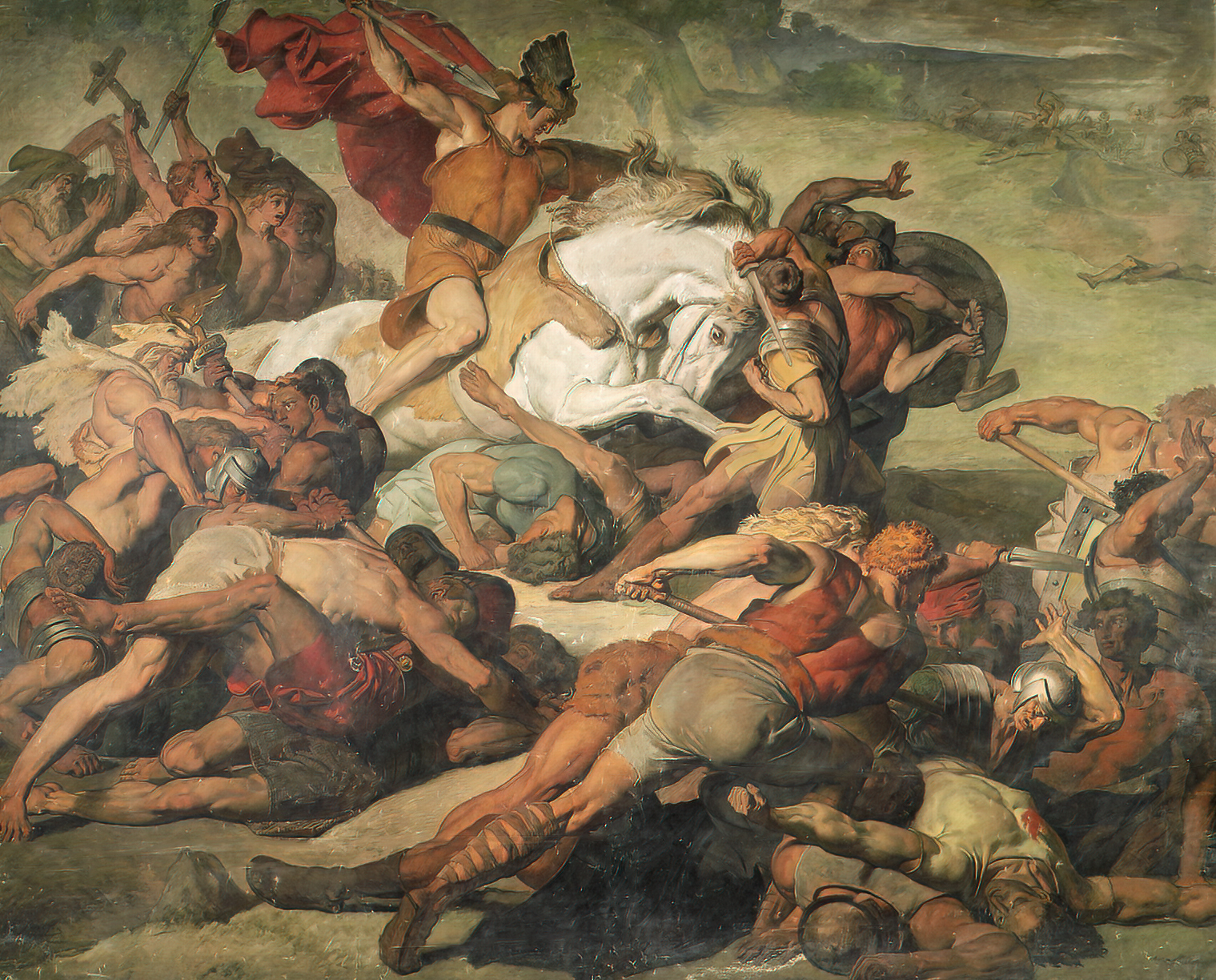
Der siegreich vordringende Hermann
("The Victorious Advancing Hermann")
— Krefeld, completed in 1873

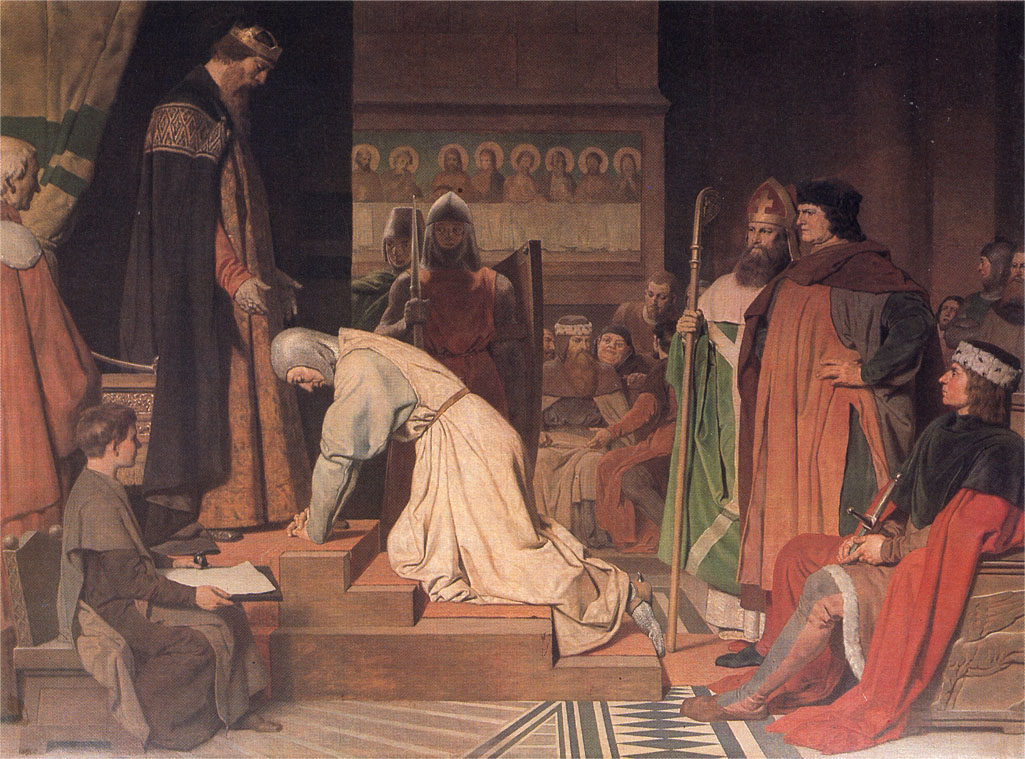
Submission of Henry the Lion to Frederick Barbarossa
— Erfurt, completed in 1882

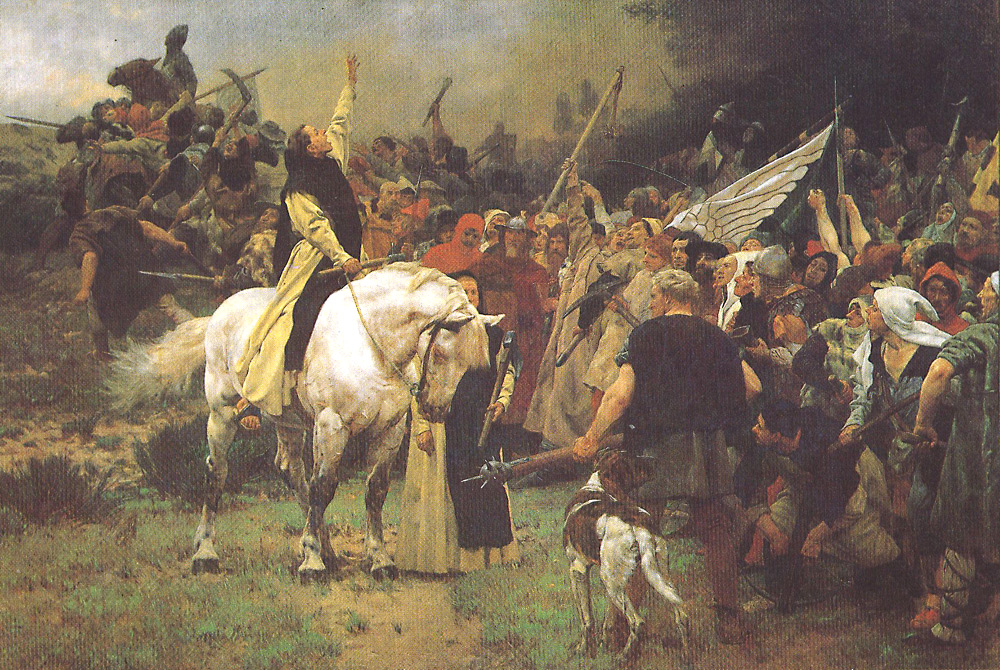
Walter Dodde und die bergischen Bauern bei der Schlacht bei Worringen
("Walther Dodde and the Peasants of Berg at the Battle of Worringen")
— displayed in Düsseldorf, completed in 1893

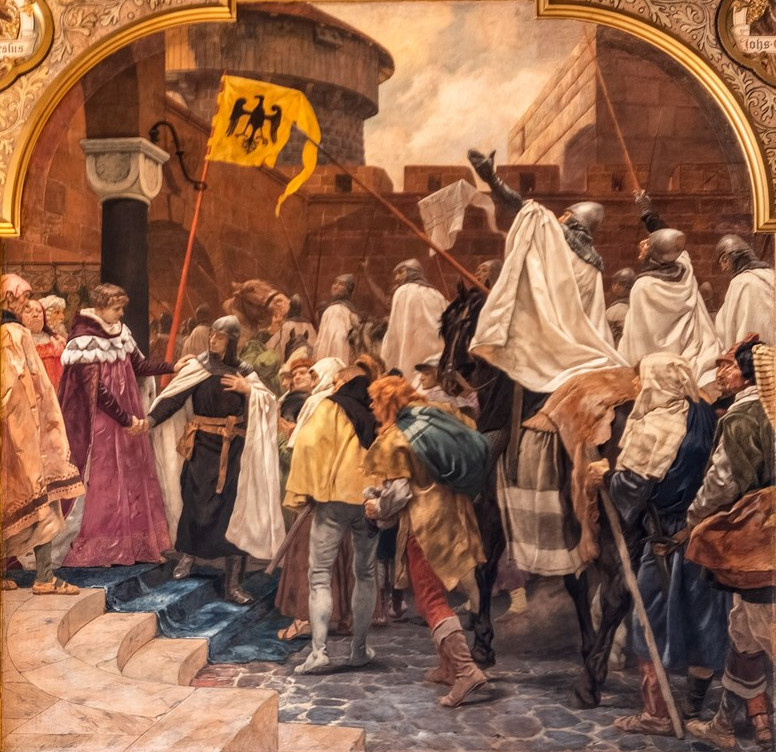
Kaiser Friedrich II entläßt nach Preußen ziehende Deutsch-Ordensritter 1236
("Emperor Friedrich II Dismisses Teutonic Knights Moving to Prussia 1236")
— Marburg, 1895 – 1903
