= Lorenz Cantador =

German military

- Born: 1 June 1810; Düsseldorf, Kingdom of Prussia
- Died: 1 December 1883 (aged 73); New York City
- Known for: Participating in the German revolutions of 1848–1849; Fighting in the American Civil War

Franz Laurenz Joseph Maria Cantador or Franz Lorenz Joseph Maria Cantador (1 June 1810 – 1 December 1883) was the commander of the Düsseldorf vigilance committee during the German revolutions of 1848–1849 and later was an officer leading a regiment in the Union Army during the American Civil War.

With Anton Bloem, Lorenz Clasen, Joseph Euler, Ferdinand Freiligrath, Moritz Geisenheimer, Paul von Hatzfeldt, Sophie von Hatzfeldt, Louis Kugelmann, Ferdinand Lassalle, Peter Joseph Neunzig, Carl Quentin, Hugo Wesendonck, Wilhelm Weyers and Julius Wulff, he was one of the main actors of the March Revolution in Düsseldorf.

== Foundation and leadership of the revolutionary vigilante group in Düsseldorf ==
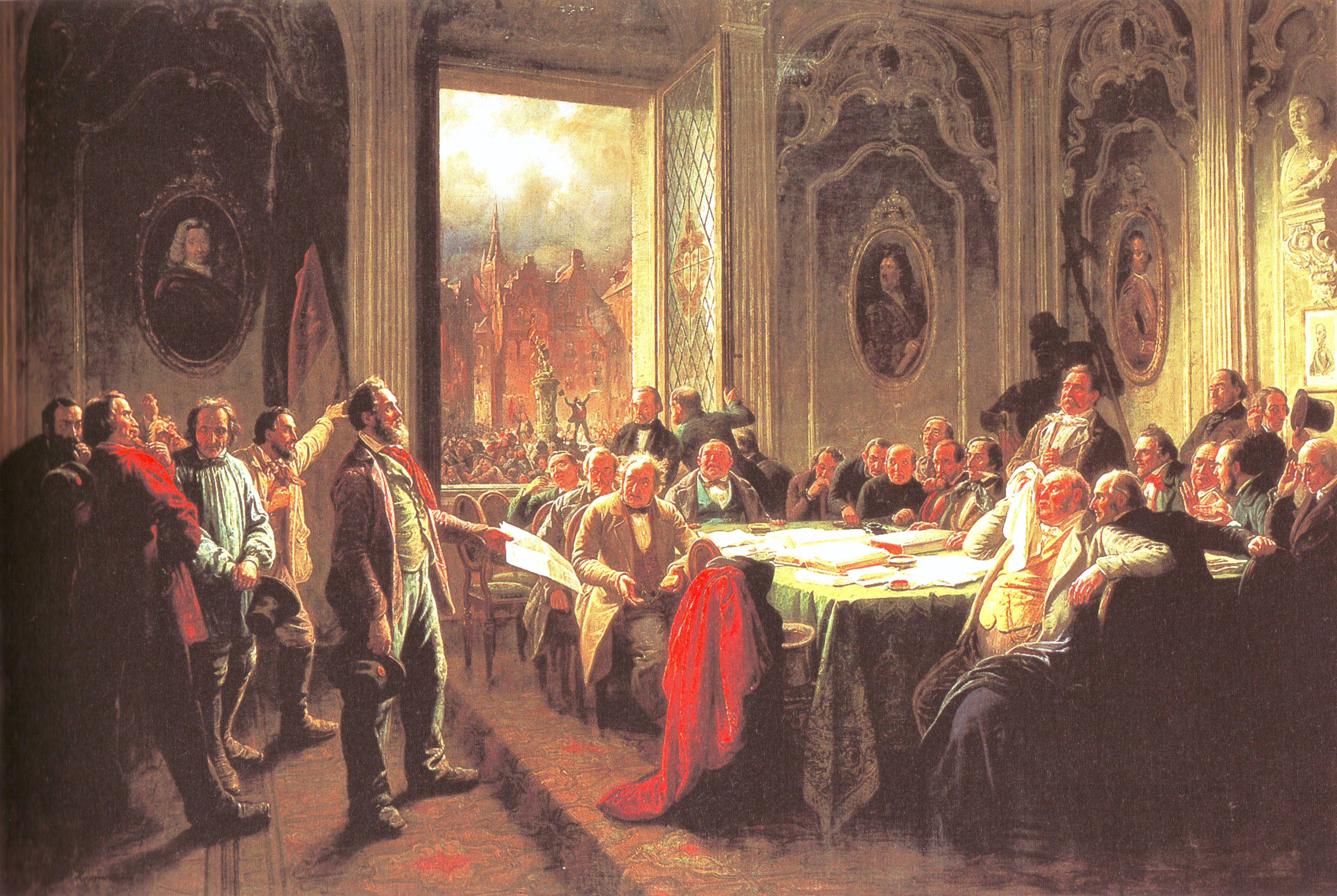
In the genre painting Arbeiter vor dem Magistrat, painted from 1848 onwards, the Düsseldorf painter Johann Peter Hasenclever, who served as an officer in Cantador's civic militia, captured the content and moods of the 1848 revolution by means of a generalised scene in a council chamber. The reference of the scene, however, is concrete. On 9 October 1848, a delegation of 600 unemployed emergency workers, whose labour measures the city of Düsseldorf could not continue to support, submitted a petition to the city hall. The view through the window of the council chamber, whose rococo décor symbolises the outmoded power relations, shows a public mass demonstration at the feet of a Saint George statue adorned with a Schwarz-Rot-Gold flag on a municipal square modelled on the Marktplatz in Düsseldorf.

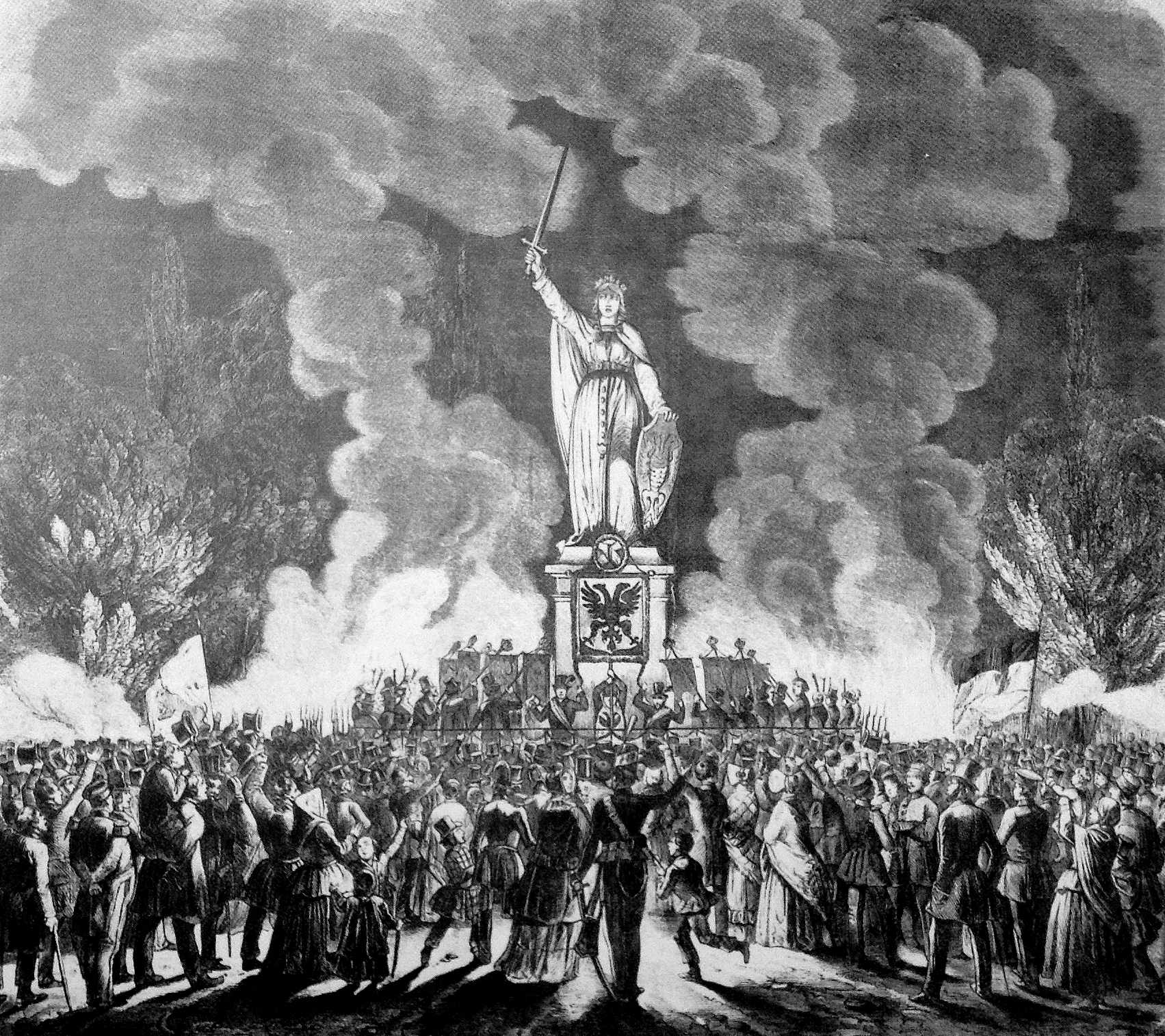
Contemporary illustration of the Festes des deutschen Einheit on 6 August 1848 auf dem Friedrichsplatz in Düsseldorf

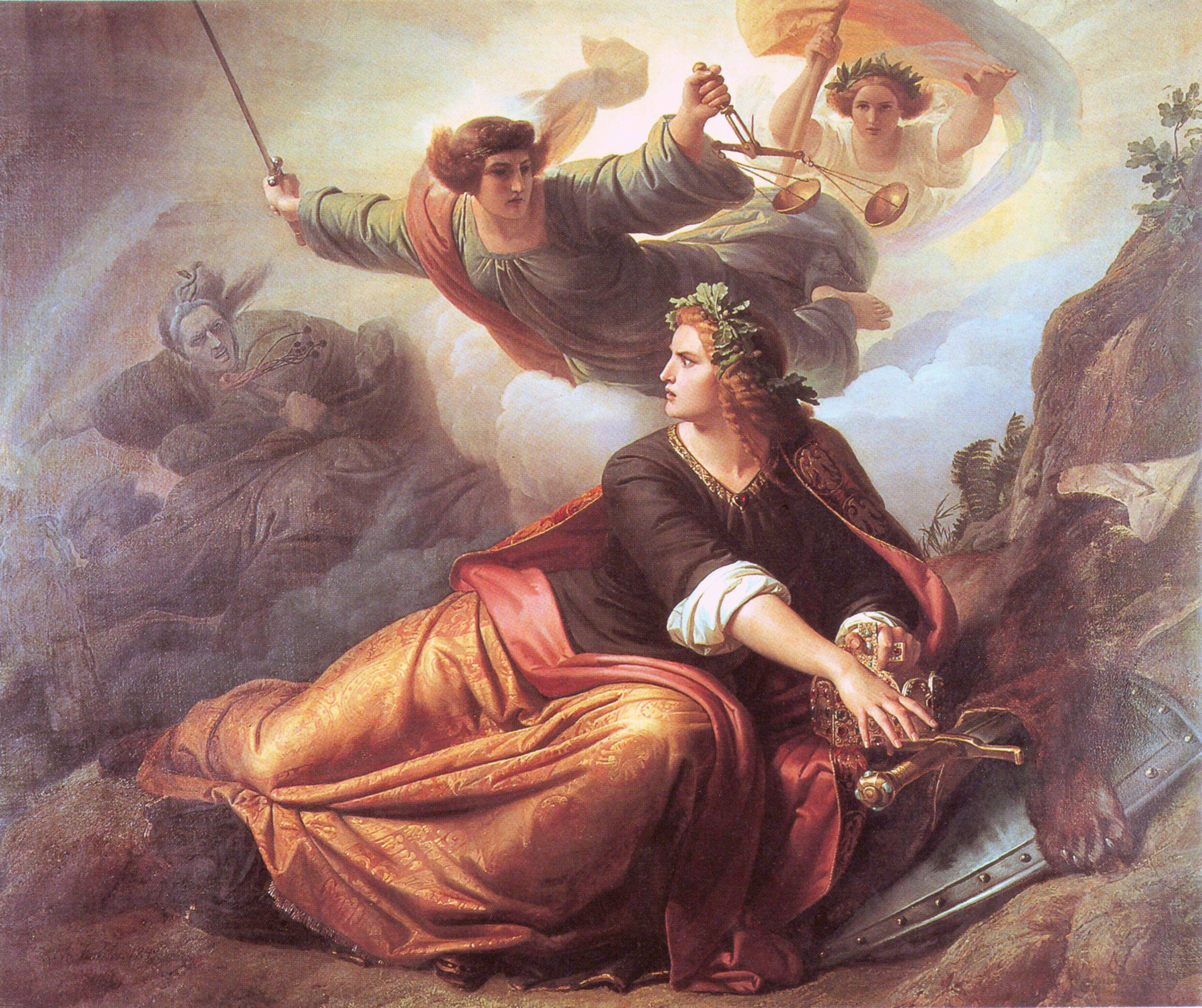
Erwachende Germania by Christian Köhler, 1849: The geniuses of justice and liberty appear to her, while bondage and discord plunge into the abyss.

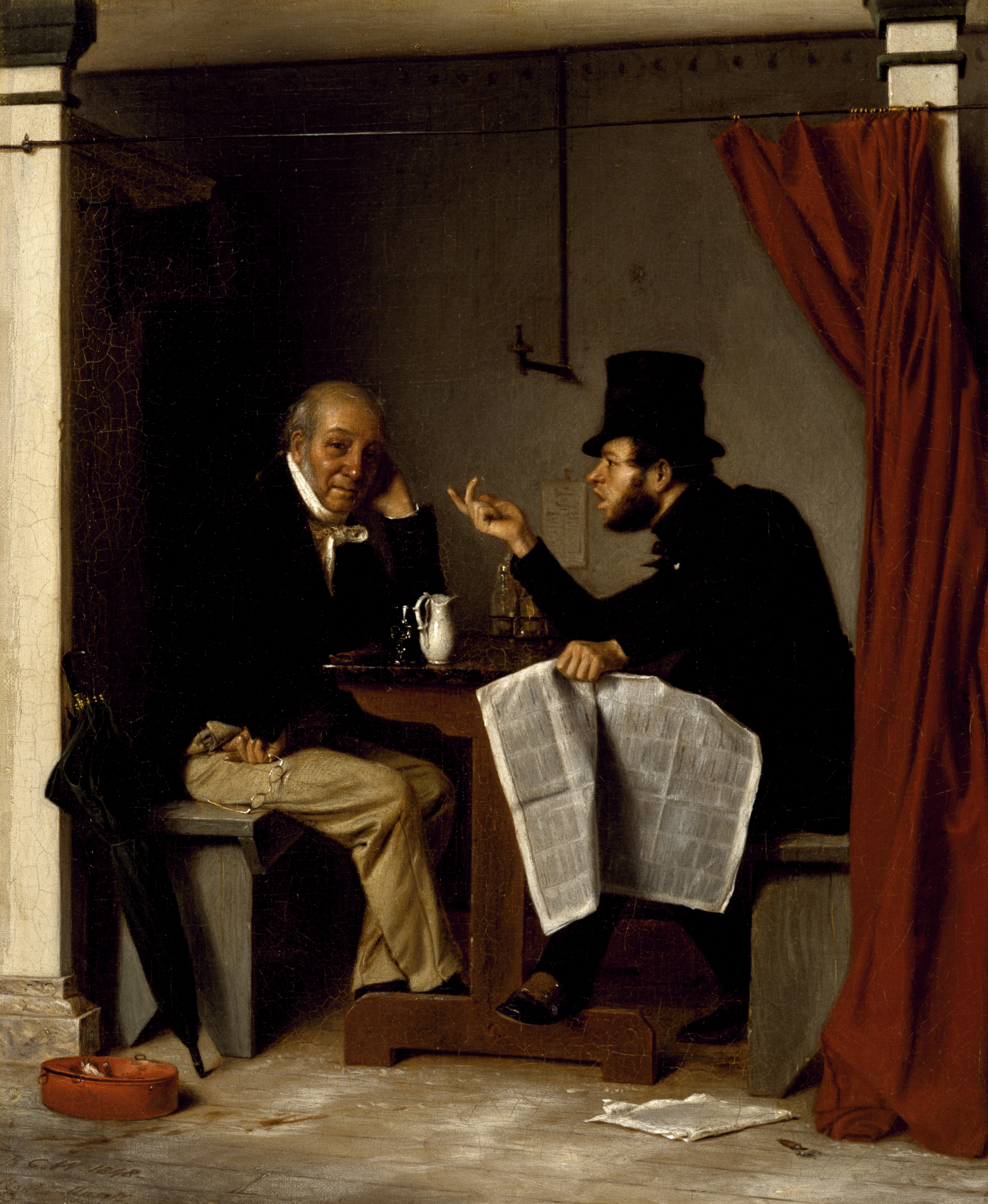
Politics in an Oyster House (Politik im Austernhaus), painting by Richard Caton Woodville, 1848: This genre painting, painted in Düsseldorf, captures the atmosphere politicised by newspaper news and the disparity between generations in their assessment of political events, as seen through the eyes of a contemporary US painter.

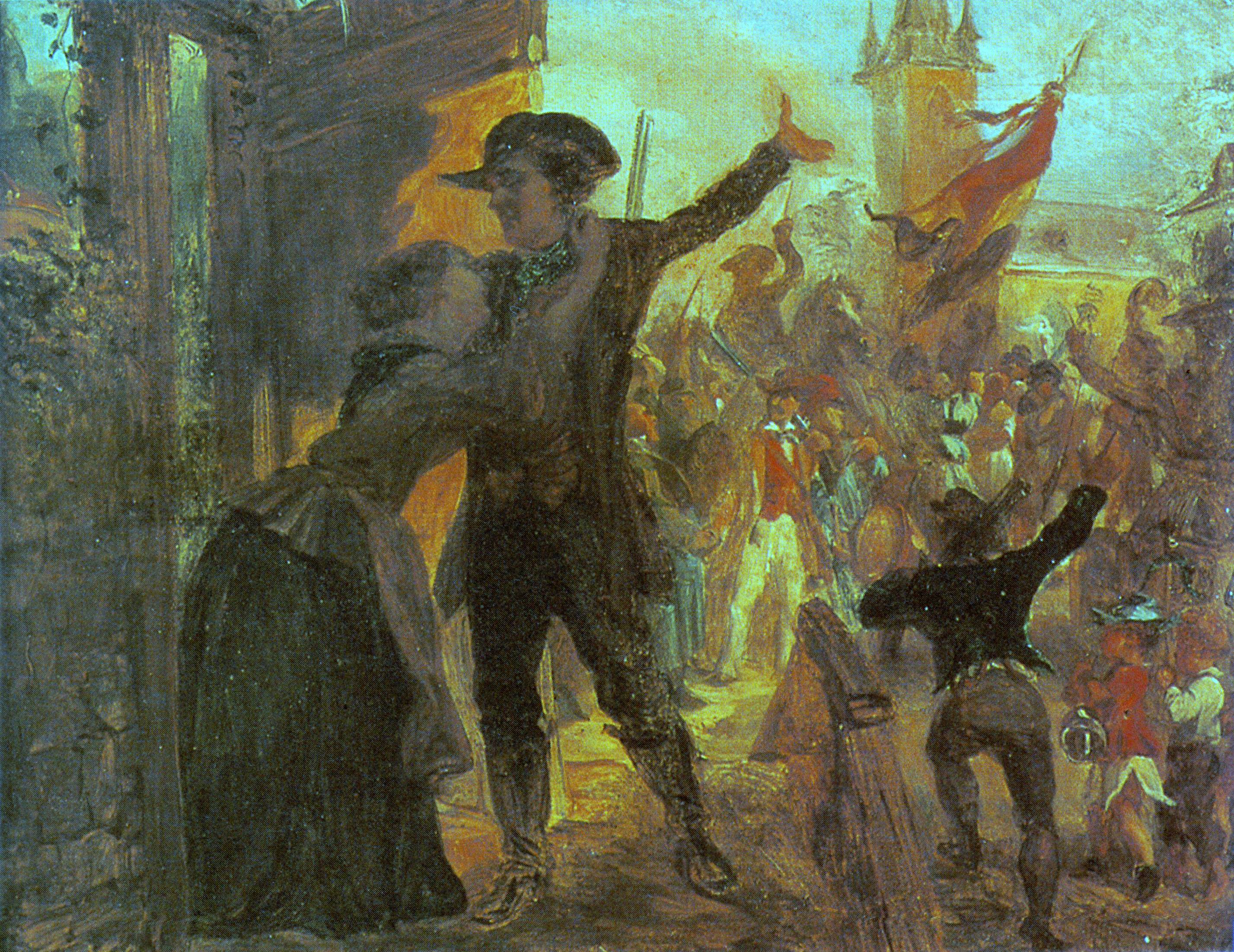
Johann Peter Hasenclever: Der Abschied des Bürgerwehrmannes, Oil on cardboard

Cantador came from a bourgeois family with northern Italian roots that had settled in Düsseldorf in the 18th century and ran a textile business there. In the political life of the city, the family had already achieved a high reputation through several city councillors, an alderman and a mayor, when Cantador was elected head of the Schützenverein St. Sebastianus in 1844, the time of the Vormärz, and founded a uniformed Jägercorps within the Schützenverein. Since the mid-1840s, Cantador – together with Hugo Wesendonck – also presided over the Allgemeiner Verein der Carnevalsfreunde (General Association of Friends of Carnival), one of the most notorious carnival societies in the Rhineland, whose satirical actions, caricaturing and provoking Prussianism, soon led to the society being banned by the Prussian Minister of the Interior.

After the bad harvest of 1846, after the economic crisis year of 1847 and after the French Revolution of 1848, political unrest also flared up in the Kingdom of Prussia with demands for democratic reforms and national unity. This unrest quickly expanded into a march revolution. During this period, Cantador intervened in events in Düsseldorf, the parliamentary seat of the Prussian Rhine Province.

On 18 March 1848, the day before King Frederick William IV of Prussia authorised the establishment of citizen guards, he was among the founders of a vigilance committee, which elected him its commander on 26 March 1848 by 735 votes out of 949. By November 1848, some 2,500 men had joined it, including Lorenz Clasen, Ferdinand Freiligrath, Johann Peter Hasenclever, Carl Hilgers, Karl Hübner, Rudolf Jordan, Ferdinand Lassalle, Carl Friedrich Lessing, Wolfgang Müller von Königswinter and Hugo Wesendonck. The vigilante group, which was later increased to around 3,500 men, was able to arm itself from older stocks from the Cologne artillery depot. The task of the Bürgerwehr was the "protection of legal freedom, preservation of concord and peace among all members of civil society, defence against any disturbance of public order". The Bürgerwehr was also the sign of the democratic awakening and the assumption of power by the people. The arming of the people was based in the people's militia idea of the French Revolution. Cantador had the vigilantes parade around the city in public view to demonstrate this to the representatives of the Prussian crown and the Prussian military.

In the initial phase of the revolution, Cantador belonged to the moderate forces that rejected the abolition of the monarchy through the proclamation of a Republic based on the French model, as the early socialist inspired Düsseldorf People's Club around Ferdinand Lassalle, Paul von Hatzfeldt and Julius Wulff was striving for. Programmatically, he was close to the democratic movement, whose main focus was on the idea of popular sovereignty, which was to be realised under the umbrella of a constitutional monarchy. On 19 March 1848, Cantador donated a black-red-gold flag, the symbol of German popular sovereignty and the national unity of Germany, which was subsequently hoisted on the Rathaus Düsseldorf. Together with Hugo Wesendonck, Cantador founded the Verein für demokratische Monarchie, (Note: On 1 July 1848, the deutschkatholische MP Christian Gottfried Daniel Nees von Esenbeck presented his bill The Democratic Monarchy to the Prussian National Assembly (online). Using the term democratic monarchy, Julius Froebel elaborated similar ideas in his 1848 paper Das Königthum und die Volkssouverainität (Online).) which, due to the elections on 1 May 1848, elected its chairman Hugo Wesendonck to the Frankfurt Parliament and members Joseph Euler and Anton Bloem in the Prussian National Assembly could send.

At the Festival of the German Unity on 6 August 1848, which had been organised by men from the citizens' militia, the Association for Democratic Monarchy, Düsseldorf painters and members of the newly founded Düsseldorf gymnastics club after the election of Archduke John of Austria as Reichsverweser, Cantador appeared as keynote speaker alongside Lord Mayor Wilhelm Dietze. The event took place in Düsseldorf on what was then Friedrichsplatz – in front of a Germania figure made of wood, cardboard and canvas, designed by Karl Ferdinand Sohn and created by Dietrich Meinardus, with raised sword in her right hand, 15 feet high, and in front of a black, red and gold standard with a double-headed, uncrowned imperial eagle as the emblem of the German Confederation adopted by the Frankfurt National Assembly in March 1848. To the strains of the song Des Deutschen Vaterland, the Germania and standard were festively illuminated with Bengal fire. (Note: The figure, the standard and the spectacle of the illumination were captured in a watercolour by the American painter Emanuel Leutze.) (Note: Another illustration of the event is preserved on a wood engraving in the Stadtmuseum Landeshauptstadt Düsseldorf.) In enthusiasm for national ideals, the artists' association Malkasten was founded on the same day.

When King Frederick William IV of Prussia visited his nephew Friedrich in Düsseldorf during the Cologne Cathedral Building Festival on 14 August 1848, and on his way from Bergischer Bahnhof to Schloss Jägerhof, he drove along what is now Königsallee (then Kastanienallee) in an open carriage, he was met by anti-Prussian protests and pelted with horse dung. This incident caused unrest among soldiers in the Prussian garrison on the evening of the same day, who eventually attacked Düsseldorf citizens with drawn sabres. Cantador alerted the vigilantes, who succeeded in forcing the soldiers back into the barracks. When the soldiers began to harass the citizens again the next day, Cantador had the troublemakers surrounded so that they could only return to their barracks, which earned him the praise of the citizens of Düsseldorf. Nevertheless, on 19 August 1848 Cantador announced his resignation from the office of head of the citizens' militia. He did so with a view to his political involvement, which he considered incompatible with his neutral position in the Bürgerwehr. The previous deputy, Cantador's cousin Lorenz Clasen, was then entrusted with the command of the Bürgerwehr. Cantador used the freedom of action he had thus gained to speak at public meetings and inspire the masses, for example in September 1848 in front of around 10,000 people in Neuss.

Cantador's moderate stance changed in the course of 1848, after the Rhenish liberal Prussian March (disambiguation) government under Ludolf Camphausen and David Hansemann had failed, Prussia had signed the Armistice of Malmö, perceived as a betrayal, in the Schleswig-Holstein Question, and news had arrived in Düsseldorf of the shooting of the deutschkatholische Robert Blum and the forced transfer of the Prussian National Assembly to Brandenburg an der Havel.

On 8 November 1848, the majority of the citizens' militia declared themselves to be the "armed body of the revolution". On 12 November 1848, Lorenz Cantador declared at a meeting of the People's Club, with whose members he had maintained constant contact, that a fight might soon break out. A commission was then formed to coordinate the building of barricades. On 14 November 1848, the revolutionary forces in Düsseldorf called for the implementation of the tax resistance decided in the Prussian National Assembly, for the implementation and supervision of which the vigilantes declared themselves to be "permanent"; i.e., to be constantly active. On 17 November 1848, Cantador was once again elected commander of the Bürgerwehr. On 18 November, Cantador, together with Ferdinand Lassalle and other delegates, went to the local authorities and prevailed that some taxes should no longer be levied. On 19 November 1848, the citizens' militia demonstrated their determination with a parade and 2,800 participants. On 21 November, in addition to the Düsseldorf Civic Guard, the Civic Guards of Gerresheim, Bilk, Ratingen and Neuss paraded through the streets of Düsseldorf to reaffirm the demands of the Prussian National Assembly. A little later, on Cantador's orders, the vigilantes searched the Düsseldorf post office for tax money, whereupon the Düsseldorf government president Adolph von Spiegel-Borlinghausen and Divisionskommandeur Lieutenant General Otto von Drigalski imposed a state of siege on 22 November 1848 and banned the Bürgerwehr. As officers of the Bürgerwehr then called for passive resistance and for people not to give up their weapons, the Prussian Minister of the Interior Otto Theodor von Manteuffel managed to get King Frederick William IV, who had not forgotten his unfriendly reception in Düsseldorf and the horse manure he had received, to ban the Bürgerwehr himself on 25 November 1848. On 28 November, Cantador was questioned by the state procurator von Ammon about the accusation that he had exceeded his powers to declare the Bürgerwehr permanent, because a municipal council resolution had been required for this. The Prussian government, which regarded Cantador as a leading figure in the revolution and suspected him of having conspiratorial connections to Berlin, had him arrested on 9 December 1848, like Ferdinand Lassalle and Wilhelm Weyers, the leader of the tax-refusal campaign, before him.

Cantador was held in custody without a formal charge until 18 March 1849. After the arrest, the state procurator received a petition and a list of signatures in which around 1500 citizens of the city demanded Cantador's release. The Düsseldorf deputy of the Prussian National Assembly, Anton Bloem, wrote to the prosecution senate of the Court of Appeal in Cologne on 28 February 1849, stating that Cantador had not called for an attack but for the defence of public order. On 17 March 1849, the authorities dropped the case against Cantador. The following day, the anniversary of the March Revolution in Berlin, Cantador was released from prison, while Lassalle and Weyers remained imprisoned. Friedrich Engels attributed this in an article in the Neue Rheinische Zeitung to the fact that Cantador, despite his political appearance, had a lot of friends among the "Düsseldorf bourgeoisie".

During the so-called 1849 Imperial Constitution campaign, Cantador once again came into the public eye. At the beginning of these riots, on 7 May 1849, the president of the government had again imposed a state of siege on Düsseldorf. On 9 May 1849, the doctor Peter Joseph Neunzig called for open resistance against the Prussian military from Cantador's house on Marktplatz and to support a "provisional government of the Rhenish Republic" founded in Elberfeld (i.e., the Elberfeld uprising). Cantodor did not let Ninety finish his speech, but pushed him away from the window of his house. Until the morning of the following day, bloody barricade fights occurred between members of the vigilantes and Prussian military, resulting in 16 deaths, among them the young painter Ludwig von Milewski. Cantador immediately fled to avoid arrest again.

== Flight and the second half of life in the United States ==
The escape led him via France to the United States, where his traces are initially lost. Cantador's economic situation was very precarious because he had used up his financial resources for his political cause. His Düsseldorf drapery business had come to a standstill during his imprisonment.

On 30 April 1851, Cantador wrote a letter from Philadelphia to Ferdinand Lassalle, expressing his hope that the revolution in Germany would soon break out again and that he would then return with many like-minded people. In this letter he also reported on his so far failed attempts to set up a business importing goods from France to the US.

In 1855, he joined the German Society of Pennsylvania in Philadelphia. When the American Civil War broke out in 1861 he joined the Union Army, serving in the 27th Pennsylvania Infantry Regiment as part of the Army of the Potomac, first as a major. A short time later he rose to the rank of lieutenant colonel, and second-in-command to regimental commander Adolphus Buschbeck. Buschbeck had been a member of the Prussian Army garrison in Düsseldorf and had also emigrated to the US for political reasons. In August 1862, Cantador fought in the Second Battle of Bull Run. Brigadier General Adolph von Steinwehr praised his valiant efforts. On 26 October 1862 Cantador was promoted to regimental commander. In this capacity he commanded the 27th Pennsylvania Regiment in the spring of 1863 in the Battle of Chancellorsville and in the summer of 1863 in the Battle of Gettysburg, where he contributed to the Union victory by holding an important position at the local cemetery.

At the age of 53, he resigned from active military service on 16 November 1863 because of an injury that had flared up again and because of pericarditis and pleurisy, and then worked in various civilian jobs. Due to his volunteer status, he was not entitled to pension benefits. He worked for the Castle Clinton Immigration Department and for the Northern Pacific Railway. He lived in New York City and the State of New York as well as in Portland, Oregon. From 1870 until 1873, he was a member of the 'German Society of the City of New York'.

On 1 December 1883, Cantador died at the age of 73, poor and forgotten in New York City where he had last stayed with German friends. A state disability pension applied for on 10 January 1883 was granted a month after his death. Cantador died without leaving a family.

== Remembrance ==
- The city of Düsseldorf honoured its son by naming a Cantadorstraße in the Stadtmitte district and by a memorial relief by the sculptor Willi Hoselmann in the arcades of the Stadtmitte at Verwaltungsgebäude Marktplatz 6.
- In memory of Lorenz Cantador, the Düsseldorfer Gesellschaft für Rechtsgeschichte e.V. has awarded since 1993 the Cantador-Medaille.

== See also ==
- Forty-Eighters
