= Ludwig von Milewski =

Polish painter

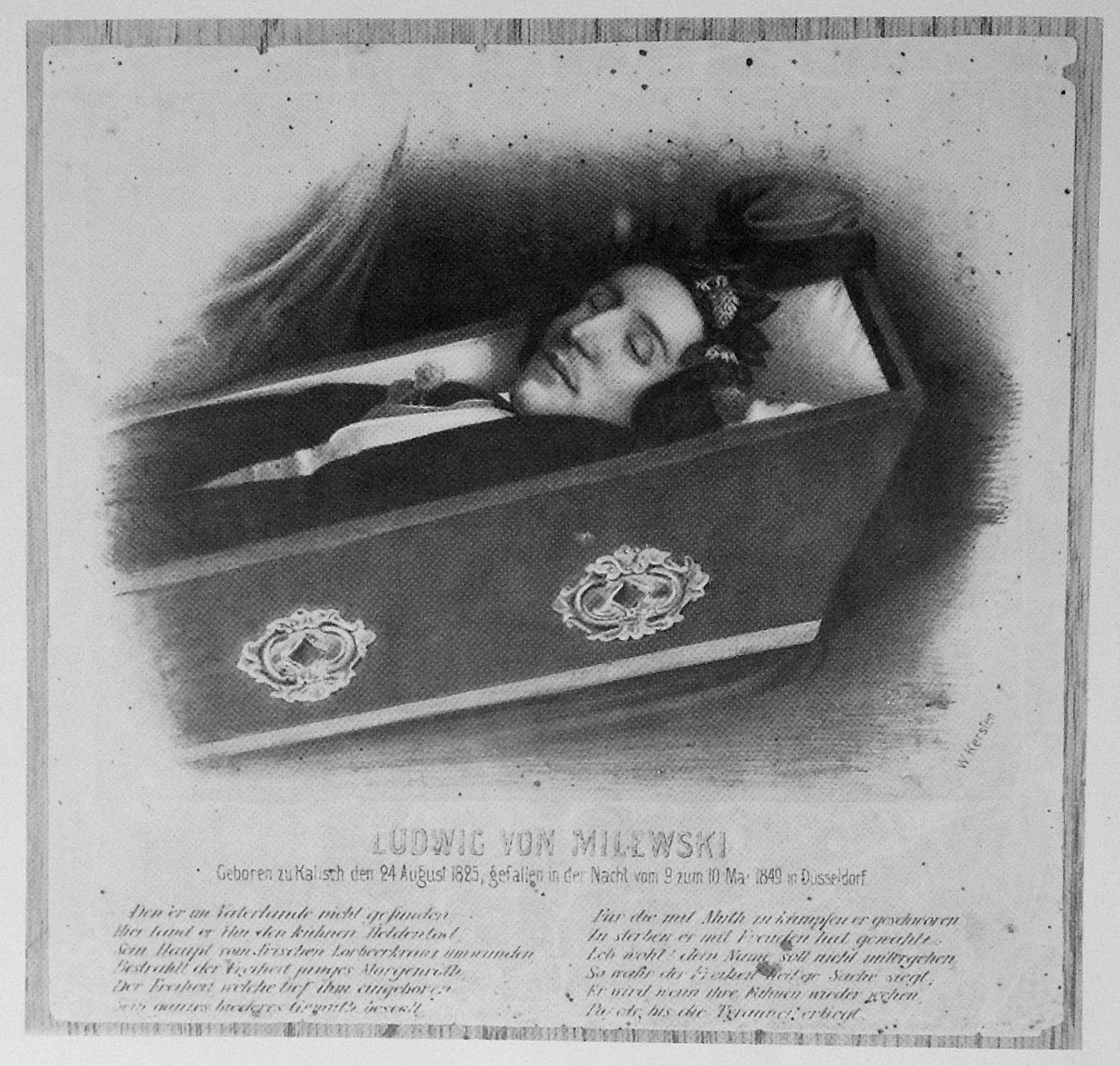
Ludwig von Milewski, Lithograph by W. Kersten, 1849, Stadtmuseum Landeshauptstadt Düsseldorf

Ludwig von Milewski, also Ludwig Milewsky (24 August 1825 – 10 May 1849), was a Polish painter. He was shot dead on a barricade as a leader of revolutionary street fighters in the 1849 May uprising in Düsseldorf.

== Life ==
Milewski was born in Kalisz, Congress Poland. Little is known about his life. Between 1844 and 1845 he had studied painting with Karl Ferdinand Sohn. Sohn was one of the teachers at the Kunstakademie Düsseldorf who, together with their students, took part in the events during the German revolutions of 1848-1849. For example, he had designed an allegorical Germania statue for the "Festival of German Unity", which was organised by the Democrats on 6 August 1848 on Friedrichsplatz in Düsseldorf.

In May 1849 the revolution also came to a head in the Rhine Province. This followed Frederick William IV of Prussia's rejection of the limited imperial dignity under the Frankfurt Constitution offered to him by the Emperor's Deputation via a German Empire. Milewski, like some other academy students, was involved in the Düsseldorf Volksklub, a local association of supporters of the ideas of republicanism and socialism under the leadership of Julius Wulff, who had close relations with the Kölner Arbeiterverein. He published an appeal in the Düsseldorfer Zeitung to the citizens to urge the Prussian state government to give freedom to the Poles. Milewski's brother was also very active politically in the context of the revolutionary events, so that the police considered expelling the brothers. During the Imperial Constitution campaign, Milewski was a leader of uprisings that took action against the Prussian authorities in Düsseldorf by street fighting and attempting to occupy official buildings. On 7 May 1849, the provisional government president Friedrich von Spankeren declared a state of siege. On 9 May 1849, the Gerresheim doctor Peter Joseph Neunzig called for armed struggle from the window of Lorenz Cantador's residence on Düsseldorf's Marktplatz. News spread that the republic had been proclaimed in Elberfeld and that military from the Düsseldorf garrison were marching there, barricades were built in the city and armed citizens attacked the city hall and the main guard. The ensuing bloody fighting between citizens and Prussian military, which claimed 16 lives on the side of the insurgents, lasted from 9 o'clock in the evening until 5 o'clock in the morning of 10 May 1849. In these battles, Milewski commanded a barricade in Grabenstraße and suffered a fatal gunshot wound. The shot from a Prussian infantryman is said to have hit Milewski as he jumped onto the barricade to ask the soldiers not to shoot at the people.

== Reception ==
The dramatic event was understood to be a sacrificial death; Milewski was buried at the Golzheimer Friedhof and celebrated as a hero. Hundreds came to decorate his coffin, which was lined all in red. The solemn march past turned into a real demonstration, so much so that the military was deployed to break it up. A depiction of his laying out was distributed as a lithograph. In 1849, the deaf-mute Düsseldorf still life painter Joseph Wilms produced a vanitas and commemorative painting of Milewski, entitled The Legacy of Ludwig von Milewski, which is now inventoried in the Stadtmuseum Landeshauptstadt Düsseldorf. This painting shows a variety of objects intended to symbolise Milewski's life and the political context of his death, such as the Statut der Bürger-Garde zu Düsseldorf, a Hambacher Fest with Schwarz-Rot-Golden cockade and a Kuchenreuter handgun.

Milewski's tomb, which had been placed in the Golzheim cemetery by Milewski's parents in 1852, was moved from Field IX to Field VII in 1948. In 2016, the District 1, Düsseldorf decided to ask the administration to relocate the tomb back to its original place. Furthermore, the district council decided to ask the administration to erect a memorial for all victims of the civil uprising of 1848/1849 at the northern end of the Golzheim cemetery. For this purpose, a model by the artist Ramon Graefenstein is available, who has designed a structural facility with crosses in a circular arrangement.
