= Malkasten-Redoute =

German carnival

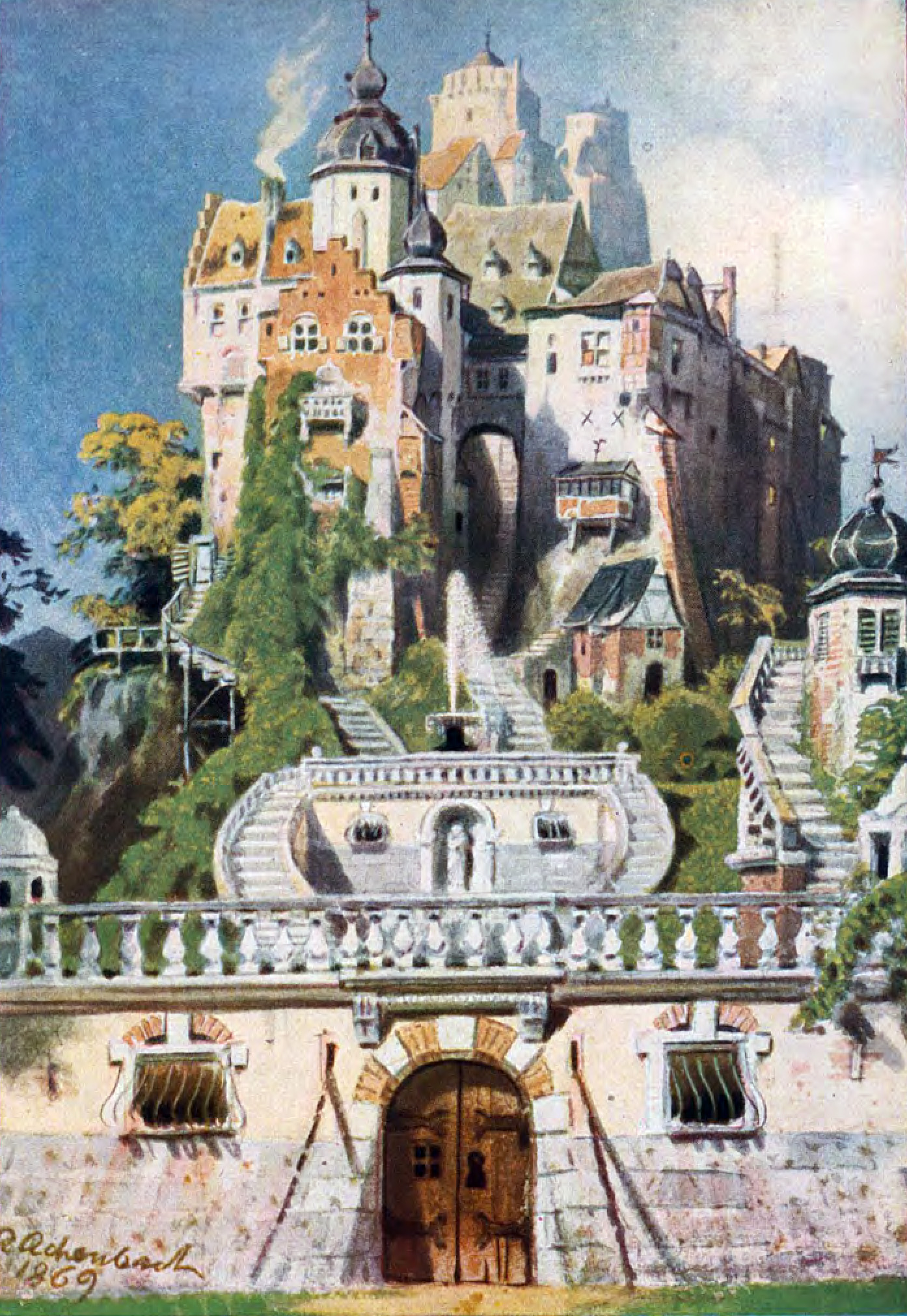
Andreas Achenbach: Draft Die Narrenburg for the 1869 Redoute

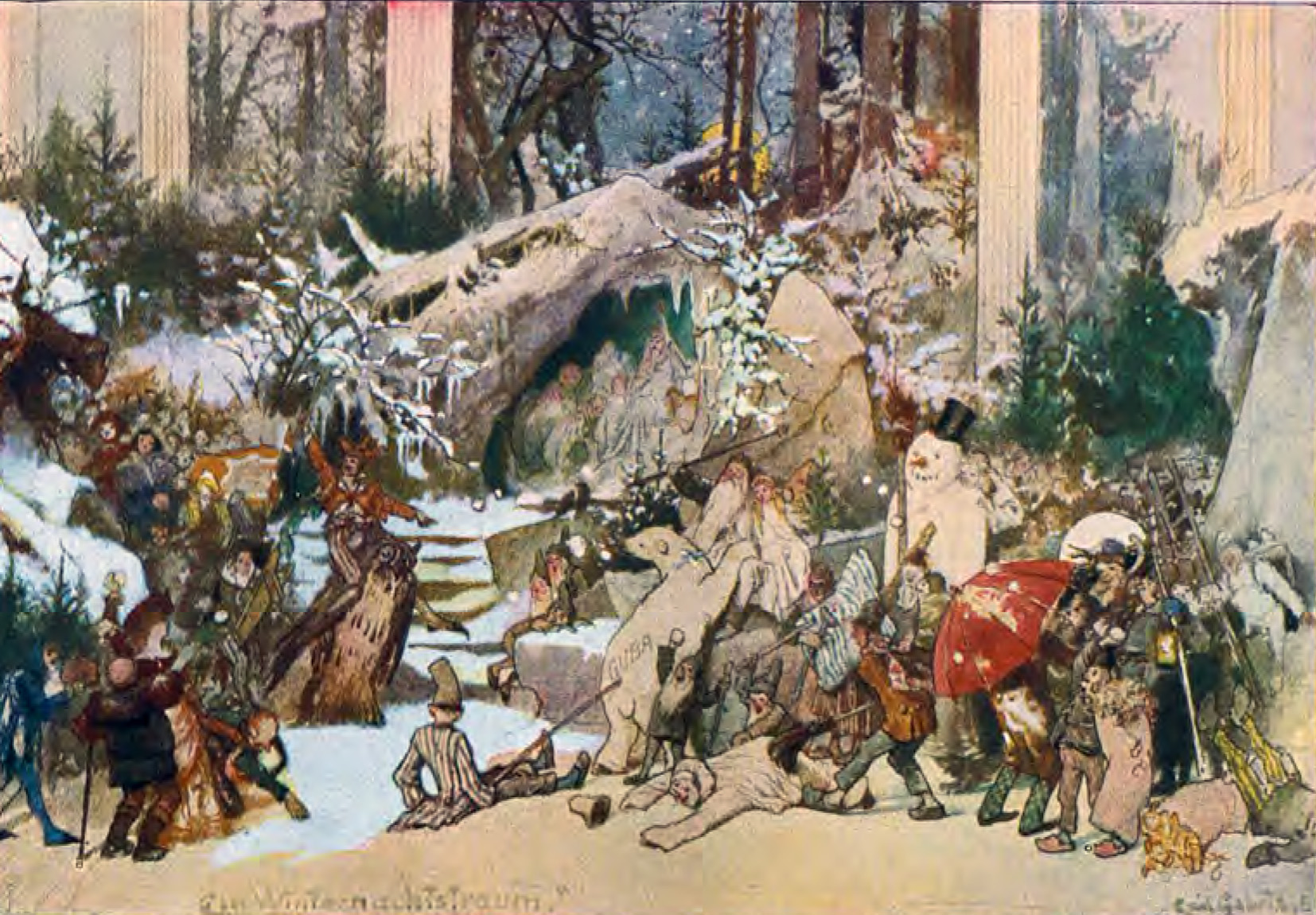
Carl Gehrts: Draft Ein Winternachtstraum for the 1888 Redoute

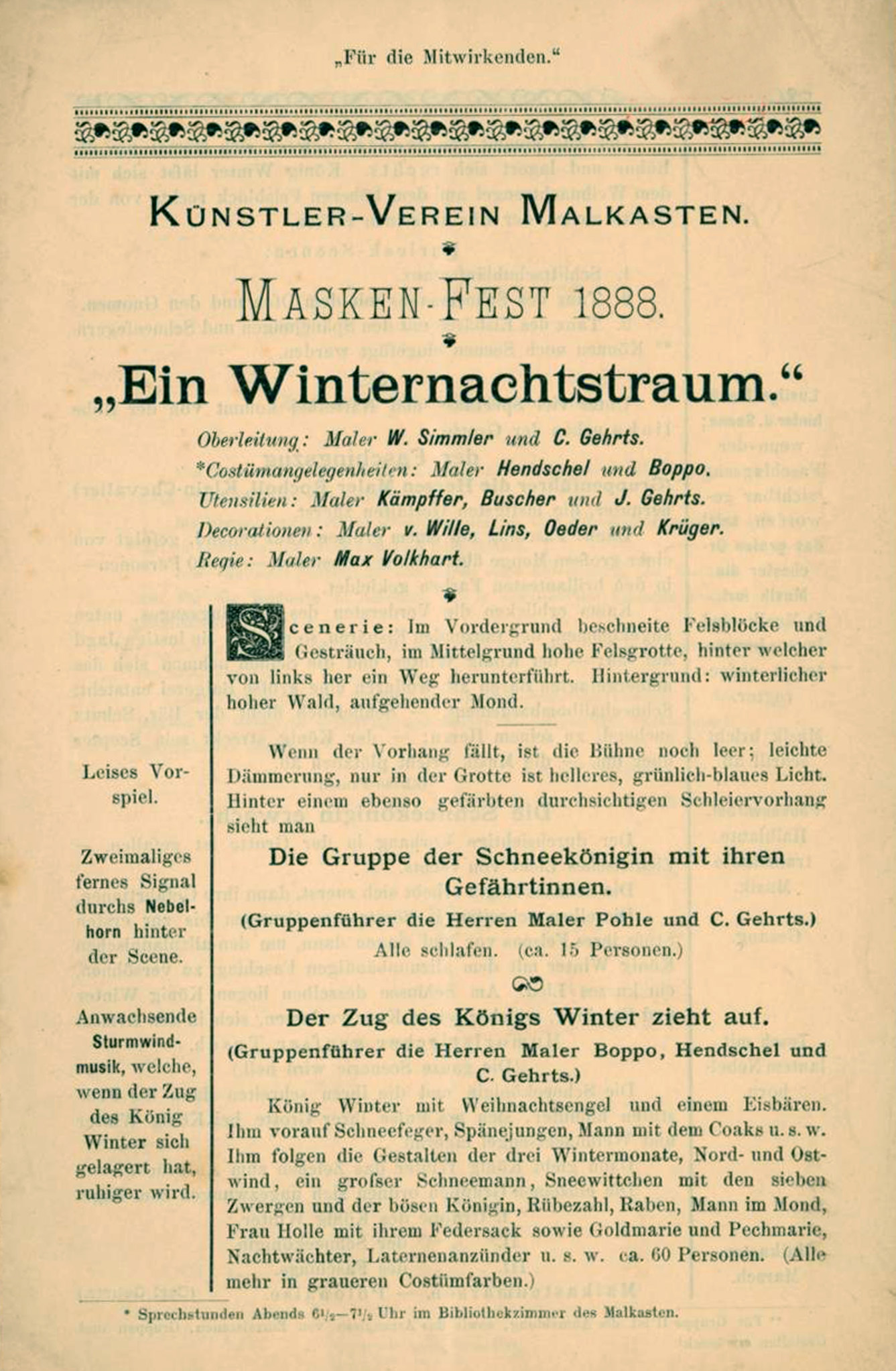
Program for Ein Winternachtstraum, Redoute of the Künstlerverein Malkasten in February 1888

The Malkasten-Redoute was an annual masquerade ball for the Düsseldorf carnival period organized at the Malkasten in Düsseldorf.

== History ==
The Malkasten (artist association) was founded in Düsseldorf in 1848 as a social association of artists of the Düsseldorf school of painting. After the club decided to admit non-artists as well, it and its festivities quickly advanced to become a social hub of the city, especially in the times of the Düsseldorfer Karneval. In addition to the "Awakening of the Hoppeditz" and the carnival parade, the Costume Ball of the KVM, the "Redoute", was a highlight of the annual carnival and the central event on Carnival Saturday. What the Rosenmontagszüge (Rose Monday processions) were for Cologne, the masked balls on Carnival Saturdays represented in Düsseldorf - at least that's how the reporters in the local newspapers around 1900 liked to put it. The Malkasten costume party on Saturday was followed by Sunday, when all the children of the better classes were dressed up in costume, carrying their panniers and guns, and then Monday and Tuesday with the masked crowd in all the streets, which lasted until Ash Wednesday morning. Then the carnival came to an end, as the last, often drunken mask wearers met pious churchgoers wearing the ash cross on their foreheads.

Since the Vormärz, the city had been one of the centres of the democratic movement and protest in Prussia. In this context, the carnival was suspected by the authorities of being used by Rhenish "Musspreußen" for anti-Prussian and revolutionary rallies. During the German revolutions of 1848–1849, in the course of which Düsseldorf citizens had formed a revolutionary vigilante group, all public demonstrations were therefore initially banned by the authorities for the carnival days in February 1849 as a precaution. However, shortly before the start of the street carnival, on 23 January 1849, this ban was lifted again so that the public festival could take its usual course.

Close personal ties developed between the Düsseldorf Carnival and the city's artistic community. On 11 November 1849, the General Association of Carnival Friends (AVdK) awarded the certificate of honorary membership to the KVM and asked it to cooperate. A connection between the members of the Malkasten and the oldest carnival society of Düsseldorf, the AVdK, founded in 1829, had already existed since 1848, the year the KVM was founded. From 1846 to 1847, the painter Adolph Schroedter President of the AVdK. He also belonged to the KVM since its foundation in 1848. Another very active member of the KVM, the painter Karl Hoff, was president of the AVdK from 1870 to 1872. The painter, caricaturist and writer Carl Maria Seyppel, a president of the AVdK and the KVM, founded the "Committee for the Organisation of an Artistic Rosenmontagszug" in 1889.

One of the first mask feste took place in February 1852 under the theme "Cinderella's Wedding" in the Geislerschen Saal, from 1865 the Kaisersaal on Flinger Steinweg was the venue. Until 1867, the KVM did not have its own club building for larger events. In the restaurant, previously known as "Becker's Gartenlokal", there was a large hall. In this hall, already called Tonhalle at that time, the number of spectators in 1850 was close to 1,000. In 1863, the city acquired the pub and the Alte Tonhalle was available until 1914 for the masquerade parties of the Malkasten on carnival Saturdays.

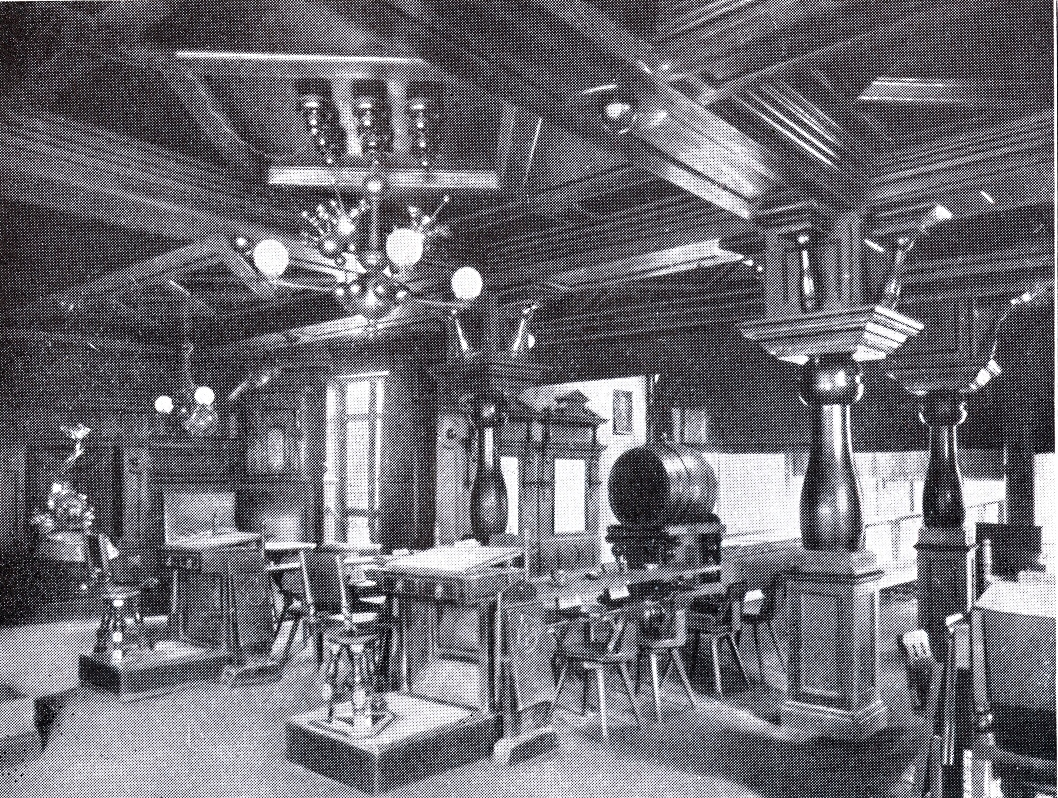
Malkasten-Kegelbahn

The masquerade festivals of the KVM were determined in their scenic arrangements and dramatic performances by the theme, the setting and the course of the festival. The stage play could either be introduced or concluded by a procession in which participants and spectators took part. In order to achieve the desired effect during the procession, the type of costume was usually fixed. Since the artists' festivities - historical pageants, masquerade festivals, revues, cabaret or theatre - demanded a great deal of creative preparation, the artists became particularly involved in them. They made designs for the costumes and decorations of the performances. For "Cinderella's Wedding", for example, Wilhelm Camphausen had designed historical costumes, which were published as pattern sheets. They were also binding for the clothing of the participants and spectators, who included, for example, Robert Schumann. Invitation cards, poster and handbill announcements were also designed by the artists. The actual spectacle was documented in paintings, later in photographs. There was always a dress rehearsal beforehand. After the great Malkasten-Redoute, the gentlemen found their cheerful conclusion in the bowling alley.

Through their masquerade, the guests were not limited to their role as spectators, but contributed significantly to the artistic framework and success of the event. The masquerade was usually accompanied by an introductory or concluding procession of costumed participants and spectators. The purchase of an elaborately designed ticket was enough to set the mood for the atmosphere of the event and to stimulate the imagination. The experience of community in the festival and the procession made it possible to involve the festival participants in the events and to transport them into the world of the performer. In the course of a festival, the self-irony of the artists became more and more evident. It broke with the aesthetically designed illusion on the stage and thus enabled a change to a relaxed festive mood. As in 1896 in "Die Narrenburg" (The Fool's Castle), in front of a decoration by Andreas Achenbach, who portrayed the prince, the court chancellor gave a speech from the throne that equated the artists' festival with art.

The rather high entrance fee formed the main income of the Malkasten, which otherwise could not have existed. In the 1880s, the members of the artists' association only had to pay 3 marks, all the others and especially the many strangers from out of town paid 15 to 20 marks for admission. The surpluses from the Carnival Redoute were used to finance other KVM events.

In the form of a festival play with a procession as an integral part of the carnival event, mainly episodes from the world of fairy tales were presented at the KVM redoubts until the beginning of the 1870s. Towards the end of the 19th century, themes appeared that could be linked to specific historical events, such as "The Hussites before Naumburg 1432" and "Triumph of the Hansa". They also reflected individual art-historically significant epochs, arranged around artistic personalities such as Dürer and Rubens. The Gründerzeit redoubt was also able to summarise historical processes. The development of the Malkasten redoute was closely related to the general spread of historical pageants in the second half of the 19th century.

In 1878, Prince Wilhelm, later Emperor Wilhelm II, who was studying in Bonn at the time, visited the Redoute "Gypsy Festival" at the Düsseldorf Künstlerverein Malkasten together with his entourage.

In 1999, the StadtMuseum Bonn in the Ernst-Moritz-Arndt-Haus showed the exhibition Feste zur Ehre und zum Vergnügen. Artists' Festivals of the 19th and Early 20th Century.

Carnival celebrations held in this particular elaborate form, known as Redoute, were celebrated until before the Second World War. The Malkasten house was badly damaged during the war and rebuilt afterwards. The Malkasten Künstlerverein nevertheless celebrates a lavish Maskenempfang and Ash Wednesday Hoppeditz funeral with traditional fish supper.

== Redoute of the Malkasten in Carnival ==
- 1852, 1 February: Aschenbrödels Hochzeit
- 1857, 18. and 19. January: Die Narren des Grafen von der Lipp, oder der überwundene Trommelschläger.
- 1867, 2 March: Naturgeschichte der Käfer“
- 1868, 22 February: Redoute
- 1869, 6 February: Die Narrenburg
- 1872, 10 February: Sage und Geschichte
- 1878, 2 March: Zigeunerfest
- 1879, 22 February: Dornröschen
- 1880, 7 February: Triumph der Mode
- 1881, 26 February: Alt Düsseldorf
- 1885, 14 February: Malkastenkolonie am Kongo
- 1887, 19 February: Ein Hochzeitsmärchen.
- 1888, 11 February: Ein Winternachtstraum; Oberleitung: Wilhelm Simmler, Carl Gehrts; director Max Volkhart.
- 1889, 2 March: Albrecht Dürer in Venedig“
- 1890, 15 February: Künstlerträume“
- 1891, 7 February: Carl Stangen's Reisegesellschaft nach Ägypten
- 1893, 11 February: Ein Fest bei Peter Paul Rubens
- 1896, 15 February: Eine Hochzeit auf dem Monde
- 1898, 19 February: Die Hussiten vor Naumburg 1432
- 1899, 11 February: Ein Blumenfest
- 1900, 24 February: Triumph der Hansa
- 1901, 16 February: Die Einholung der Jacobe von Baden
- 1904, 13 February: Die Verlobung des ... Ritters Delorsky mit Fräulein Kunigunde
- 1914, 21 February: Liebeszauber
- 1912, 17 February: Hollands Blütezeit.
- 1927, 26 February: Im Reiche des Buddha
- 1931, 14 February: Na Wat denn?
- 1934, 10 February: Ungeheuerliches im Malkasten
- 1938, 26 February: Düsseldorf vor 650 Jahren. ...
