= Lied für NRW =

Unofficial anthem of North Rhine-Westphalia

Coat of arms of North Rhine-Westphalia

"Lied für NRW" or Hier an Rhein und Ruhr und in Westfalen is, since the 60th anniversary celebrations of North Rhine-Westphalia, a non-official regional anthem of this German Bundesland. There are several local anthems of various North Rhine-Westphalian regions, but there had not yet been an anthem for the entire state.

== History ==
The anthem was a gift of the regional broadcasting station Westdeutscher Rundfunk to the federal state of North Rhine-Westphalia on its 60th anniversary. It was presented to the public on 23 August 2006, the official anniversary date, at Düsseldorf, the state's capital.

The lyrics were created by Hans Knipp and the Bläck Fööss band, and the melody was composed by Dietmar Mensinger, Hanno Beckers and the Bläck Fööss band.

== Text ==
Unser Land lag verbrannt in den Wunden,
die der Krieg geschlagen.
Doch mit Herz und Verstand
nahmst du dein Schicksal selber in die Hand.
Erschaffen aus Ruinen,
als man die Hoffnung endlich wiederfand.
Hier an Rhein und Ruhr und in Westfalen;
Alaaf, Helau, Glückauf für unser Land!

Refrain:
Hier an Rhein und Ruhr und in Westfalen,
an Sieg und Ems, im Lipperland,
hier an Rhein und Ruhr und in Westfalen,
schlägt unser Herz, lebt unser Land!

Neue Heimat, neues Glück,
viele haben’s hier bei dir gefunden.
Bauten auf die Zukunft Stück für Stück,
warf es sie auch schon manchesmal zurück.
Auf dem bunten Marktplatz der Kulturen,
da ist das Leben, da hat jeder seinen Stand.
Hier an Rhein und Ruhr und in Westfalen;
Kölsch, Alt und Pils, gemeinsam Hand in Hand!

Refrain

Our land lay burnt in wounds
that the war had inflicted.
But with heart and head
you grasped your fate.
Create from ruins
when finally hope was found again.
Here at Rhine and Ruhr and in Westphalia;
Alaaf, Helau, Glückauf for our land!

Refrain:
Here at Rhine and Ruhr and in Westphalia,
at the Sieg and Ems, in the Lipper Land,
here at Rhine and Ruhr and in Westphalia,
beats our heart, lives our land!

New home, new fortune,
many found it here with you.
Built the future, piece by piece,
despite many occasional setbacks.
On the varied market of cultures,
there is the life, there everyone has a place.
Here at Rhine and Ruhr and in Westphalia;
With beers like Kölsch, Alt and Pils, together hand in hand!

Refrain

== Melody ==
Source
