= 27th Pennsylvania Infantry Regiment =

Union Army infantry regiment

27th Pennsylvania Volunteer Infantry
- Active: January 1861 – June 11, 1864
- Country: United States
- Allegiance: Union
- Branch: United States Army; Union Army
- Type: Infantry
- Engagements: First Battle of Bull Run; Battle of Cross Keys; Second Battle of Bull Run; Battle of Chancellorsville; Battle of Gettysburg; Battle of Wauhatchie; Battle of Lookout Mountain; Battle of Missionary Ridge; Knoxville Campaign; Atlanta campaign Battle of Resaca

The 27th Pennsylvania Volunteer Infantry was an infantry regiment that served in the Union Army during the American Civil War.

== Service ==
The 27th Pennsylvania Infantry was originally organized in Philadelphia, Pennsylvania as a state militia regiment in January 1861 as part of the "Washington Brigade" under the command of Colonel William F. Small. It was reorganized in April 1861 as a light artillery regiment, but rejected by Pennsylvania for state service under the call for three-month service regiments. The regiment left for Washington, D.C. where Colonel Max Einstein offered the regiment to the U.S. Army as infantry on May 5, 1861. It mustered in for a three-year enlistment May 30, 1861.

The regiment was attached to 1st Brigade, Miles' Division, McDowell's Army of Northeastern Virginia, to August 1861. Blenker's Brigade, Division of the Potomac, to October 1861. Stahl's Brigade, Blenker's Division, Army of the Potomac, to March 1862. 1st Brigade, Blenker's 2nd Division, II Corps, Army of the Potomac, March 1862. 1st Brigade, Blenker's Division, Department of the Mountains, to June 1862. 1st Brigade, 1st Division, I Corps, Army of Virginia, to September 1862. 1st Brigade, 1st Division, XI Corps, Army of the Potomac, to October 1862. 1st Brigade, 2nd Division, XI Corps, Army of the Potomac, to October 1863, and Army of the Cumberland to April 1864. 2nd Brigade, 2nd Division, XX Corps, Army of the Cumberland, to May 1864.

The 27th Pennsylvania Infantry mustered out June 11, 1864. Veterans and recruits were transferred to the 109th Pennsylvania Infantry.

== Detailed service ==
Moved to Baltimore, Md., April 18. Attacked in streets of Baltimore April 19. Returned to Philadelphia and reorganized for three years. Moved to Washington, D.C., June 17–18. Advanced on Manassas, Va., July 16–21, 1861. First Battle of Bull Run July 21. Duty in the defenses of Washington, D.C., until April 1862. Operations in the Shenandoah Valley May to August. Battle of Cross Keys June 8. At Sperryville and Centreville until August. Pope's campaign in northern Virginia August 16-September 2. Battle of Groveton August 29. Second Battle of Bull Run August 30. Duty in the defenses of Washington, D.C., until December. Reconnaissance to Snicker's Ferry and Berryville November 28–30. Marched to Fredericksburg, Va., December 10–15. Duty at Falmouth and Brooks' Station until April, 1863. Operations at Welford's, Kelly's and Beverly Fords April 14–15. Chancellorsville Campaign April 27-May 6. Battle of Chancellorsville May 1–5. Gettysburg Campaign June 11-July 24. Battle of Gettysburg July 1–3. Pursuit of Lee July 5–24. Duty on line of the Rapidan, near Bristoe Station, until September. Movement to Bridgeport, Ala., September 24-October 3. March along Nashville & Chattanooga Railroad to Lookout Valley, Tenn., October 25–28. Reopening Tennessee River October 26–29. Battle of Wauhatchie October 28–29. Battles of Chattanooga November 23–27. Orchard Knob November 23. Tunnel Hill November 23–24. Missionary Ridge November 25. March to relief of Knoxville November 27-December 17. Duty in Lookout Valley until May 1864. Atlanta Campaign May 1–25. Demonstration on Rocky Faced Ridge May 8–11. Dug Gap, or Mill Creek, May 8. Battle of Resaca May 14–15. Near Cassville May 19. Advance on Dallas May 22–25. Left front May 25.

== Casualties ==
The regiment lost a total of 134 men during service; 5 officers and 67 enlisted men killed or mortally wounded, 62 enlisted men died of disease.

== Commanders ==
- Colonel Max Einstein - mustered out October 2, 1861
- Colonel Adolphus Buschbeck
- Lieutenant Colonel Lorenz Cantador
- Lieutenant Colonel August Riedt - commanded at the Battle of Missionary Ridge while still at the rank of captain after Maj McAloon was mortally wounded
- Major Peter A. McAloon - commanded the regiment at the Battle of Missionary Ridge where he was mortally wounded in action

== See also ==
- List of Pennsylvania Civil War Units
- Pennsylvania in the Civil War
