= Moritz Geisenheimer =

German activist

Moritz Geisenheimer (1818 – 27 March 1878) was a German merchant, politician, and playwright. He was an activist for Jewish Emancipation and involved in the German Gymnastics and National Movement- furtherly he was one of the first sports officials in Düsseldorf. Geisenheimer was also a publicist and politician for the democracy movement during the German revolution of 1848–1849.

== Life ==
Born in Düsseldorf, Geisenheimer, a merchant, owned a shop for spices and colonial goods in the centre of Düsseldorf's old town (de: Düsseldorfer Altstadt) in Bolkerstraße, and later at Bahnstraße 41 (in the present-day district of Stadtmitte). Well-read and interested in the contemporary issues facing Judaism in Germany, he wrote an article in 1841 for the Leipzig-based Allgemeine Zeitung des Judentums, in which he introduced the philologist and poet Ludwig Wihl. Wihl's brother, the painter Lazarus Wihl, was one of Geisenheimer's friends during the Vormärz period preceding the March Revolution of 1848.

Geisenheimer's first contribution to public life in Düsseldorf was a drama that he, a previously unknown playwright, had submitted to the management of the Düsseldorfer Theater under the title Der Bravo. The drama premiered on 30 March 1847 with only moderate success. Based on the 1831 novella The Bravo by James Fenimore Cooper, the play tells the story of Carlo, a freedom fighter for popular sovereignty and republicanism who finally decides to emigrate after being rescued from imprisonment, but vows to return in more prosperous times. Critics regarded neither the performance of the play nor its ending with much enthusiasm.

In the summer of 1847, Geisenheimer also began to develop a political presence. The catalyst for this was an anti-Jewish remark made by the Prussian Minister of State Ludwig Gustav von Thile in the "Three Estates Curia" of the First United Parliament (Erster Vereinigter Landtag) in the course of deliberations on the Prussian Jewish Law of 1847, which was subsequently disseminated through the press. Von Thile had claimed in a parliamentary session on 14 June 1847 that "the Jew in and of himself can have no fatherland but that to which his faith refers him. Zion is the fatherland of the Jews." Therefore, according to von Thile, Jews could never become Germans and were consequently also incapable of holding state office. Geisenheimer, together with the painter Louis Bacharach and Dr Salomon Heinemann, protested against this in the liberal, Heidelberg-based German Newspaper (de: Deutsche Zeitung) with the following public statement:

We declare loudly and before all the world: We Jews of Prussia have and long for no other fatherland than the nation whose glory and greatness are our glory and greatness, whose language is ours, whose customs are ours, whose fall and rise we experience vividly as one part of the whole, for whose freedom we know to fight and to die. Germany, rather Prussia is the nation in which we were born, in which our dead rest, whose brothers are our brothers. We have no other fatherland than our Germany, our Prussia with its history and future. The spirit of reconciliation and harmony will, this we also know, eventually touch the hearts of even the most intolerant. Until then, we and all our comrades in faith are, in the words of Uriel da Costa, 'of those who die by the wayside'.

In 1847, Geisenheimer was a key figure in the development of gymnastics in the Rhineland region. As one of the founders of the Düsseldorfer Turnverein von 1847, one of the oldest gymnastics clubs in the area still in existence today. In 1848, 1850 and 1851, he presided over its executive committee, which also took on the task of training the general population in combat-readiness.

When the March Revolution of 1848 broke out in Düsseldorf and a vigilance committee led by Lorenz Cantador paraded through the streets of the city with great fanfare, associations with the goal of publicly expressing political interests emerged at the local level. In April 1848, Geisenheimer was among the founders of the Verein für demokratische Monarchie (lit. transl. “Association for Democratic Monarchy”). As one of the leading figures of this association, which succeeded in getting its candidates elected as delegates to the Frankfurt National Assembly and the Prussian National Assembly with clear majorities, Geisenheimer represented the Düsseldorf democrats at the Rhineland-Westphalian Congress on 12 August 1848 in Cologne. He also acted as publisher and editor of the association's publication, Die Volksstimme.

Geisenheimer died after a prolonged period of suffering at the age of 59 in Düsseldorf, mourned by his wife, children and brother-in-law.
