= Büttenrede =

West German cultural tradition

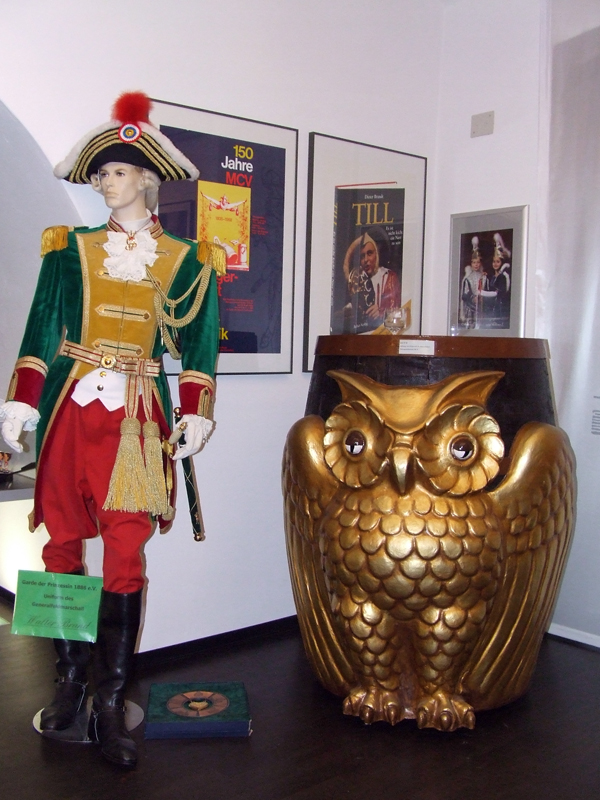
A Mainzian bütt using an owl-motif.

A Büttenrede lit. 'barrel speech' (also washtub speech, carnival speech) is a humorous speech, originating in the western German cultural tradition, that is given during carnival. It is usually given at carnival conventions, revue-like events organized by carnival societies. Büttenreden are often rhymed and are performed from a special lectern called a bütt (rhenish franconian/moselle franconian/colognian/rhinelandic for barrel, vessel) in a local German dialect. Over the last few decades, Büttenreden have also become more popular in eastern Germany, including at the Berlin carnival.

== Format ==
Especially in the Rhenish carnival tradition, the format of the traditional Büttenrede has undergone many changes. The spectrum of Büttenreden nowadays ranges from elements of stand-up comedy and sung interludes to dialogues and ventriloquism. Even the bütt itself is only rarely visible, although this is usually for technical reasons. The content of the speeches has also gradually shifted from an expository, ironic mirroring of society to merely performing a collection of jokes.

== Origin ==
The Büttenrede can be traced back to the medieval practice of Rügerecht, through which peasants were allowed to freely criticize their rulers during carnival without fear of retribution.

== Rhyme structure ==
Structurally, the traditional rhymed Büttenrede is known to use a very consistent metre, for example iambic pentameter. It is often divided into multiple stanzas, that, like a refrain, end in the same, reoccurring punch line. The preferred rhyme scheme is a couplet (AA BB).

== Televised carnival conventions ==
There are several long-running broadcasts of Büttenreden through carnival conventions designed for TV on German public television. Prominent examples include Mainz bleibt Mainz, wie es singt und lacht, Fastnacht in Franken, and Kölle Alaaf.

== Controversy ==
The use of racist and misogynistic language has a well-documented history in this tradition, and, in more recent times, has sparked discussions around bigotry in the carnival scene as a whole. In 2020, an orator in the village of Süplingen in Saxony-Anhalt held a Büttenrede in which he used derogatory language towards asylum seekers and Black people. Although the head of the local carnival society originally refused to censure him, the speaker ultimately apologized and resigned from the society.
