= Düsseldorfer Karneval =

German carnival

The Düsseldorfer Karneval is the Düsseldorf variant of the "fifth season" known as carnival. The Düsseldorf carnival begins on 11 November each year with the symbolic awakening of the Hoppeditz and ends on Ash Wednesday of the following year with his burial. The period of carnival is called the Carnival session and marks a high point in the social life of the state capital with numerous sittings and balls. Together with the events in Cologne and Mainz, the carnival procession is one of the largest in Germany. Its annual television broadcast made it known nationwide.

== History ==
=== The beginnings of the Düsseldorf Carnival ===
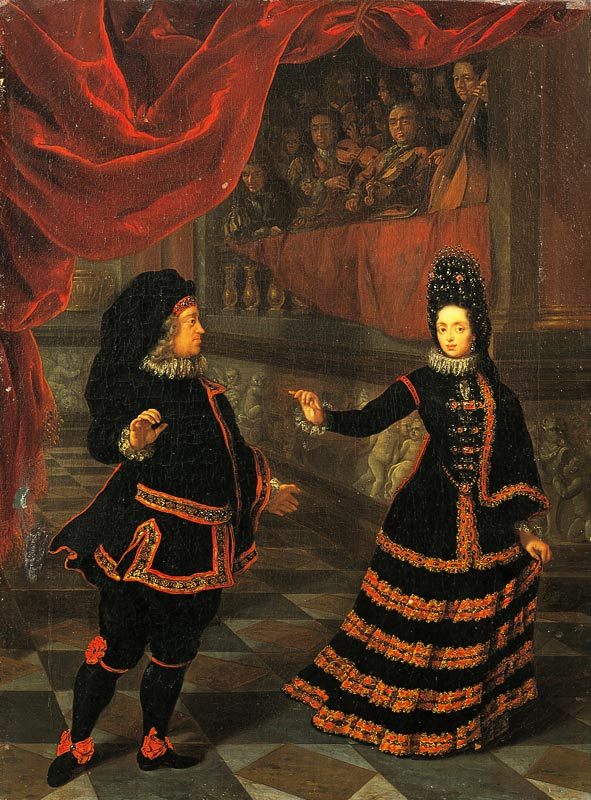
Court couple Jan Wellem and Anna Maria Luisa in Spanish costume at a masquerade ball, painting by Jan Frans van Douven, 1695

Already in ancient times, there were festivities in which disguise, increased alcohol consumption or parades played a role. Whether the origins of the Rhenish carnival can possibly be traced back to the Roman Saturnalia, which were also celebrated in the then Roman Rhineland, cannot be proven. However, numerous elements can be found there that still characterise today's carnival, such as the abolition of class distinctions, the increased consumption of alcohol, the loosening of morals and parades in the streets.

The origins of the Düsseldorf carnival have not been handed down. The first report of carnival celebrations in the Düsseldorf Castle on the occasion of Shrovetide dates back to 1360. It was there that the berg and jülichsche Nobility. The Düsseldorf historian Friedrich Lau assumes that carnival was also celebrated in bourgeois circles as early as the 15th century. In the 16th century, carnival celebrations were so entrenched in Düsseldorf customs that the sick in the Siechenhaus were given an allowance for the "vastelavent". While masquerade balls according to Venezian model were celebrated at the Düsseldorf court, especially during the time of the Elector Jan Wellem, the celebrations of the subjects, especially of the lower social classes, were of a more raucous nature. According to a description by the Düsseldorf regional poet Hans Müller-Schlösser, many Düsseldorf citizens found the carnival at the beginning of the 19th century vulgar and noisy. In its form at the time, carnival was also suspect to the authorities. Due to the carnival regulations of 1806 issued by King Maximilian I, the jesters had to acquire a "police card" in order to be allowed to be in public dressed up or masked. Under French rule, carnival was largely banished to enclosed spaces.

After the end of the French period, now under Prussian rule in the Rhineland, the carnival amusements also shifted back to the public streets and squares in the city. Carnival events were held on the days from Sunday to Tuesday. In 1825, for example, these fell on 13 to 15 February. During this time, masquerade balls were held in public establishments and events were held in public houses with musical entertainment. One of the highlights were the public amusements on Tuesday on Carlsplatz. Police regulations regarding floats and horseback riding had to be observed especially for this Tuesday. Also in 1825, a "Carnevals-Comité", forerunner of today's Comitee Düsseldorfer Carneval, was formed in Düsseldorf, following the example of the Festkomitee Kölner Karneval founded in 1823. The "Comité", which was responsible for the festivities, was supported by respected citizens of the city, including numerous artists, with the aim of giving the carnival an orderly structure and also making it attractive for the better classes.

The oldest Düsseldorf carnival society is the Carnevalsverein pro 1829, which later changed its name to Allgemeiner Verein der Carnevals-Freunde. This society was founded on 8 February 1829 in the Hofgartenhaus from an exclusively male association that had been meeting loosely since 1826. Since its foundation, the association was banned by the authorities several times for political reasons. In 1844, the Düsseldorf District President Adolph von Spiegel-Borlinghausen even had the association dissolved. After the re-admitted association had begun in 1846 to send artistically designed honorary certificates appointing honorary members to liberal personalities, among others to Ernst Moritz Arndt and to Friedrich Christoph Dahlmann, the Prussian Minister of the Interior Ernst von Bodelschwingh-Velmede demanded the renewed prohibition of the association in 1847, whose president in 1846 and 1847 was the painter Adolph Schroedter.

=== The modern carnival in Düsseldorf ===
It can be traced back in Düsseldorf at least to 1833. After a masquerade on Burgplatz, the "engagement of Hanswursten to Anna Dorothea Petronella Weichbusen" was celebrated in the evening under Helau und Habuh.

The Prussian King Friedrich Wilhelm III had "carnival merrymaking" generally banned by cabinet order of 31 January 1834. The state of Prussia saw in carnival the danger of "impairing morality in the dancing pleasures that produce raw pleasure, especially among the lower classes of the population, the encouragement of the holding of drinking parties and the reckless spending of money that this causes, which leads to poverty and thus reduces prosperity". An exception was only opened for those cities in the Rhine Province in which carnival events had continued since time immemorial. On this basis, the city of Düsseldorf applied to hold a carnival procession, which was allowed to be held for the first time in 1834 with official approval. However, the first organised carnival parades were still long behind the Malkasten-Redoute, the costume and masked ball of the Malkasten, which had been organised since the middle of the 19th century and was one of the supra-locally known and social highlights of the Düsseldorf carnival.

== Expressions and highlights of carnival ==
The beginning of the carnival season falls every year on 11 November. On Martinmas the Hoppeditz awakens at exactly 11:11. He rises from a large mustard pot in front of the Jan Wellem monument on the market square in front of the town hall and gives his both funny and biting "opening speech" for the new session, the irony of which is countered by the respective mayor.

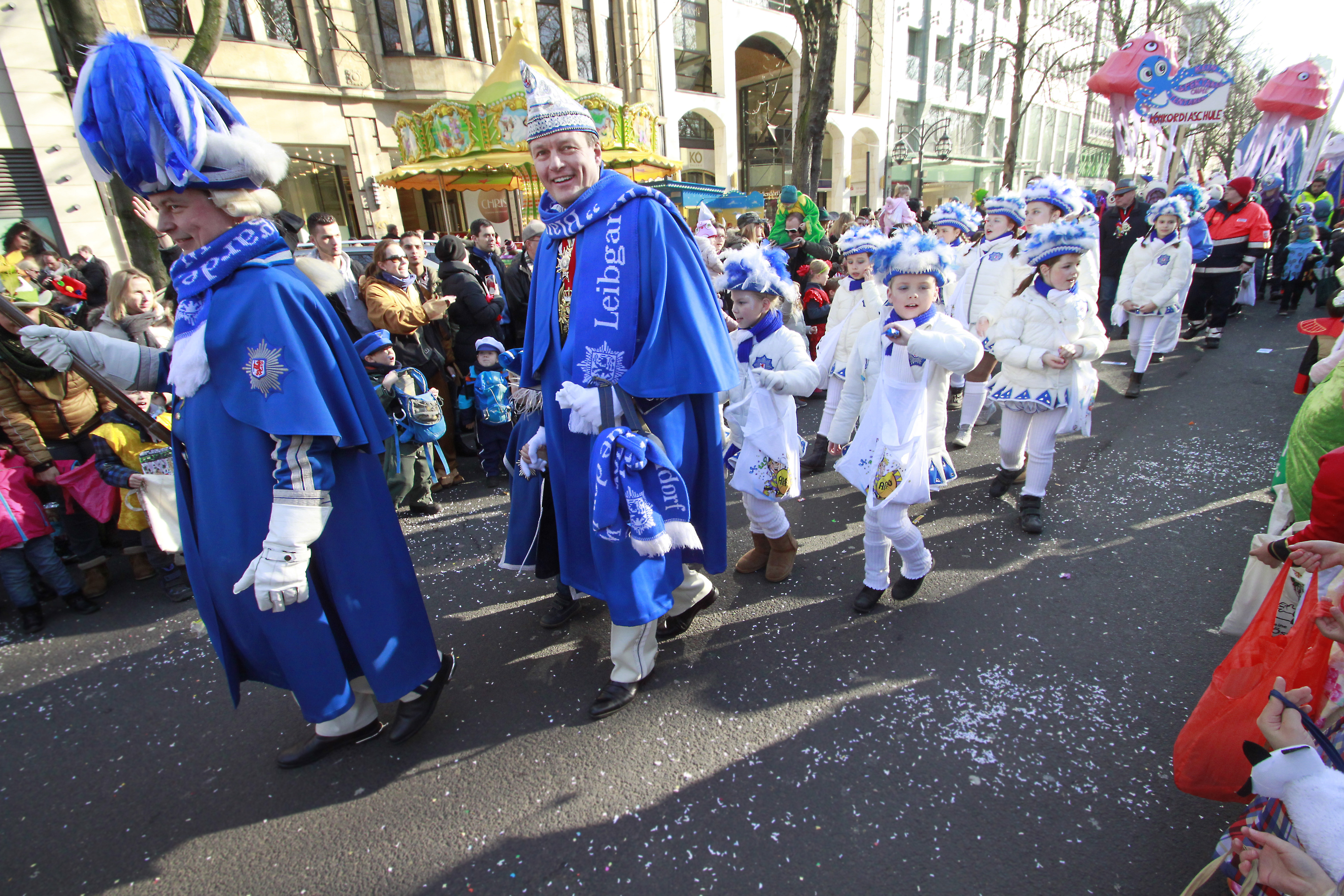
Kids' parade on Carnival Saturday: Prinzengarde Blau-Weiß and Konkordiaschule

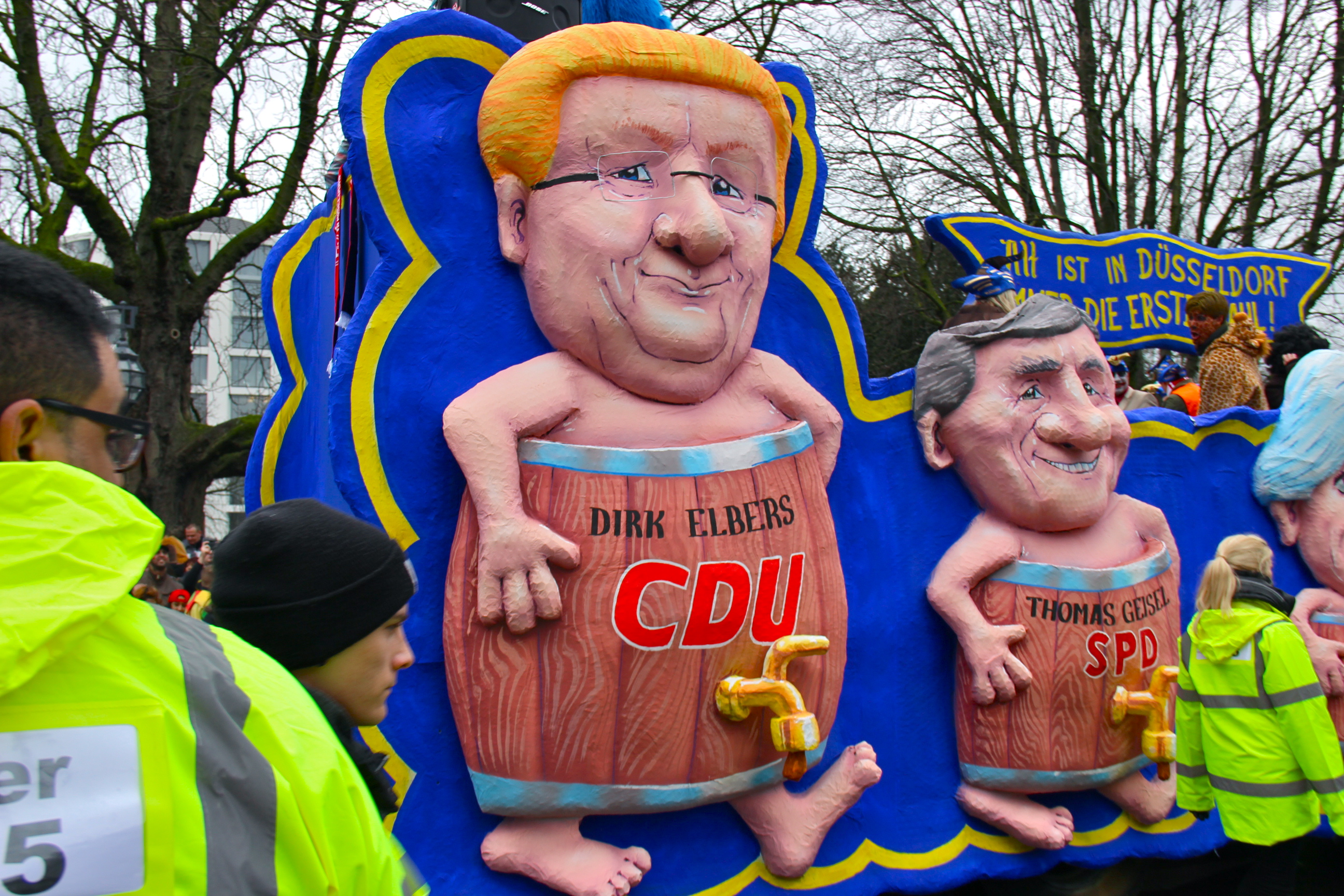
The Lord Mayor of Düsseldorf Thomas Geisel, who left office in 2020, and his predecessor Dirk Elbers - depicted in the 2014 Rose Monday procession

In the new year, many carnival associations organise costume balls and so-called sessions at which Büttenrede, dances by dance guards, among others, and carnival songs are performed. The appearance of the Düsseldorf prince and princess (consisting of the prince with his lady Venetia) is often a highlight of such sessions. Today, Rosenmontag is the highlight of the carnival (organised by the Düsseldorf Carnival Committee and its affiliated clubs). Then, in the Carnival parade, over 60 floats once. again roll past hundreds of thousands of celebrating guests and "supply" them with "Balkes" or "Kamelle" (sweets and other small gifts) thrown from the floats. Numerous volunteers have been busy for several months beforehand building the floats, which usually caricature current events. Numerous costume and music groups from all parts of Germany and neighbouring countries join the Shrove Monday procession and provide atmosphere and music. The Shrove Monday procession had to be postponed twice due to weather conditions. In 1990 the procession was postponed to 19 May, in 2016 to 13 March. In 1991, the procession was cancelled altogether due to the Third Gulf War. In 2018, the Jewish Community of Düsseldorf took part in the Rosenmontagszug for the first time with a float dedicated to Heinrich Heine.

The Shrove Monday procession enjoys great attention through the annual nationwide live broadcast on television. In the twentieth century, the political caricature floats designed by Jacques Tilly are increasingly brought to the fore. After these also caused international disgruntlement among those depicted, the themes were kept secret until the start of the procession so that they could not be warned off in advance. In particular, the reactions of the Archbishop of Cologne, Cardinal Joachim Meisner, and those of the Turkish President Recep Tayyip Erdoğan attracted widespread attention in the press and politics.

Equally important in Düsseldorf is the "unorganised" Fat Thursday and Sunday carnivals are the highlights there. On Weiberfastnacht, the women storm the town hall at 11:11 am. The working women celebrate at the workplace and go on a "trophyn" hunt, which consists of cutting off the ties of as many male colleagues as possible. On Carnival Sunday, hundreds of thousands from Düsseldorf, the Ruhr region and the Lower Rhine meet on Königsallee and in the Old Town to celebrate Carnival together. Many of the jesters can be found in costume and with originally decorated handcarts or bicycle superstructures, which primarily serve as storage space for provisions (beer, spirits, solid food).

Since 1995, a so-called Tuntenlauf on the Kö has taken place on carnival Saturdays in cooperation between the Comitee Düsseldorfer Carneval and Heartbreakers, the support association of the Düsseldorf Aidshilfe. Due to the success of the event with the corresponding crowds of visitors, the security requirements grew to such an extent that the event could no longer be financed and had to be discontinued in 2010. Since 2011, under the direction of the "KG Regenbogen", the successor event has taken place under the motto "Tunte lauf!" in fixed venues, most recently in a discotheque near the Kö.

The "Children and Youth Parade" is more recent. Since 2006, daycare centres, schools and clubs have paraded through the city centre on Carnival Saturday. There is a prize for the most imaginative ideas. The relaxed atmosphere has become particularly popular with families. Horses and large floats are not used, so that even the smallest visitors can enjoy themselves on this day.

In imitation of the Veedelszöch in the Cologne Carnival, smaller parades called Veedelszooch (note the different spelling and pronunciation, see also Benrath line) have also formed on Sunday in some Düsseldorf districts. The Gerresheim Veedelszoch, which has been taking place since 1976, attracts the most visitors. In contrast, the barrel race in Niederkassel, which first took place in 1887, has a much longer tradition. Other Veedelszooch take place in Angermund, Wittlaer, Lohausen, Eller, Mörsenbroich, Benrath, Reisholz and Itter. The larger parades in Gerresheim, Niederkassel and Eller each attract tens of thousands of visitors.

A special situation is found in the Unterbacher Carnival. There, the completely independent carnival with a prince and princess and a parade with a catchment area in the surrounding towns, which existed even before the municipal reorganisation in 1975, has been preserved. This was also the nucleus of the Düsseldorf regional bands "Halve Hahn" and "Alt Schuss". The latter had its biggest hit with "Die Sterne funkele" (The Stars Sparkle), which was originally the session motto for the Unterbach carnival in 1997.

The merry goings-on came to an end on Ash Wednesday with the cremation of the Hoppeditz amid great lamentations from the Möhnen in the garden of the Stadtmuseum Landeshauptstadt Düsseldorf.

== Film ==
- 2015: Die große Narrenfreiheit. A documentary about Jacques Tilly and the Düsseldorfer Karneval.
