= Lorenz Clasen =

German painter

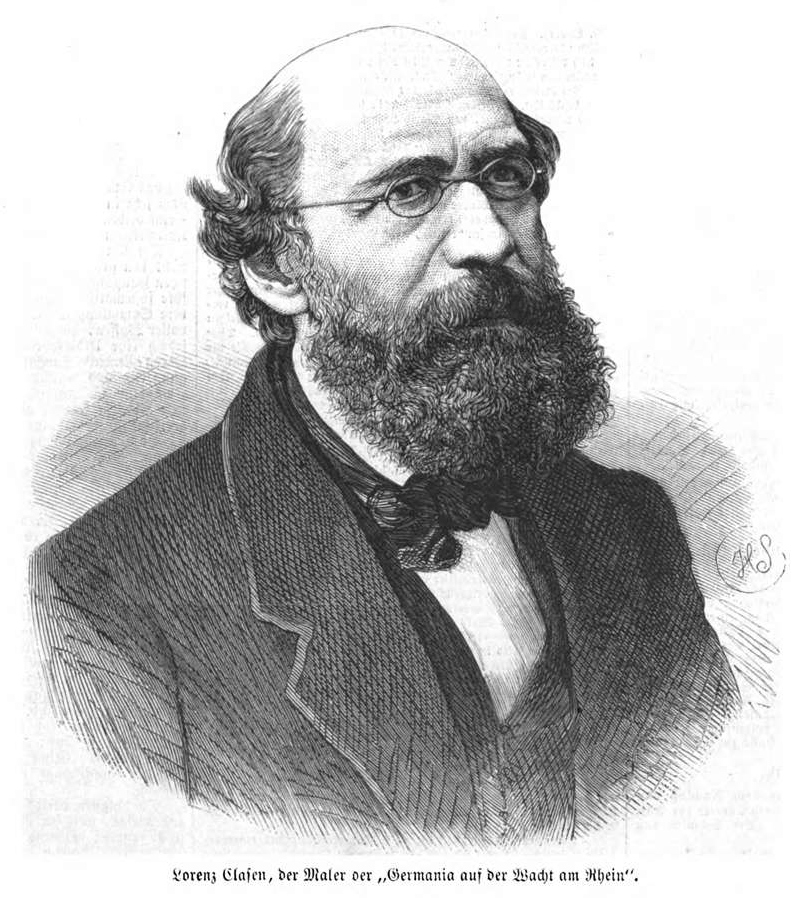
Lorenz Clasen (1871), drawing by Hermann Scherenberg

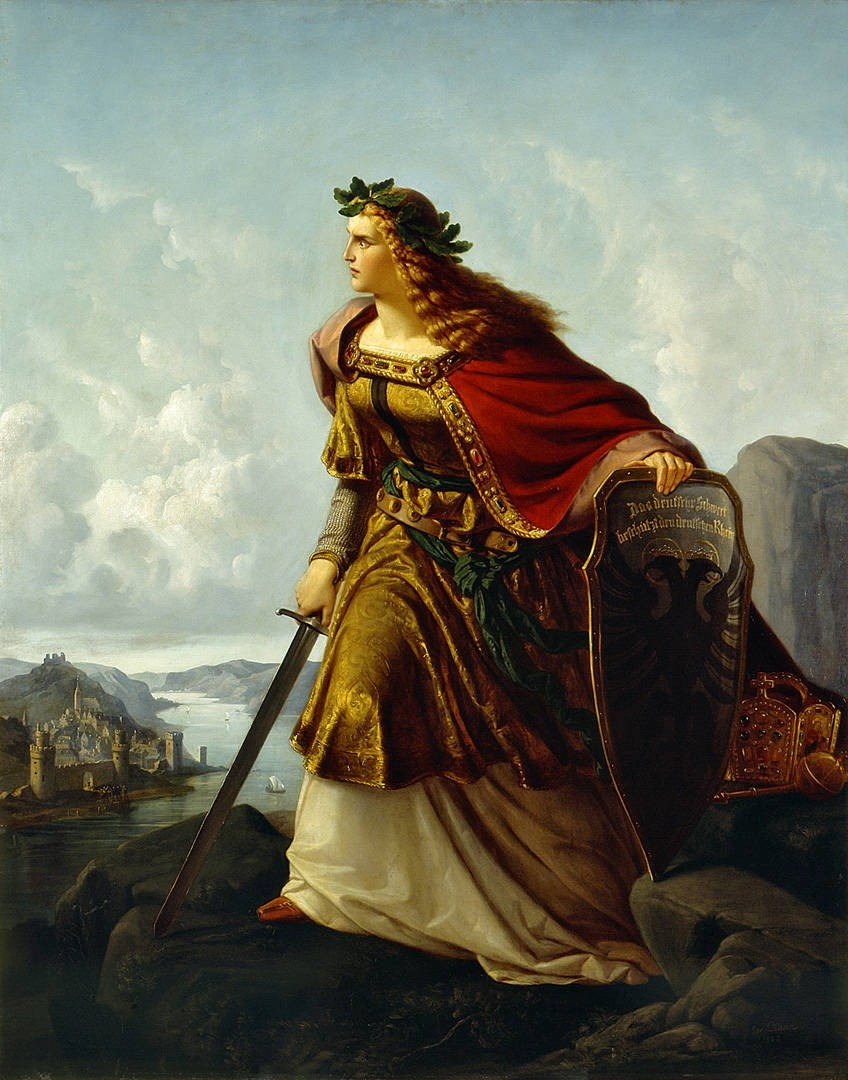
Germania at Watch on the Rhine (1860)

Lorenz Clasen (14 December 1812 – 31 May 1899) was a German history painter and author; best known for his frequently reproduced painting, "Germania auf der Wacht am Rhein" (Germania at Watch on the Rhein), in the town hall of Krefeld, which was inspired by the popular song Die Wacht am Rhein.

== Biography ==
He was born in Düsseldorf. At the request of his father, he began by studying law at the University of Bonn, but switched to the Kunstakademie Düsseldorf in 1829, where he studied art with Rudolf Wiegmann instead. His early works were mostly religious in nature.

In addition to painting, he worked as an art critic; providing reviews for numerous local and foreign publications. In 1842, he moved to Neuwied, where he served as a tutor for Prince Maximilian. Over the next few years, he produced historical paintings and created frescoes for the Elberfeld Town Hall (now the Von der Heydt Museum).

During the Revolution, Clasen served as a Deputy Commander of the Bürgerwehr (Vigilance committee). When his cousin, Lorenz Cantador, resigned, he was promoted to Commander.

From 1847 to 1849, he was Chief Editor of the Düsseldorfer Monathefte, a satirical monthly. Then, after a brief stay in Berlin, he settled permanently in Leipzig sometime in the early 1850s. While there, he served as an editor at the Familien-Journal. Later, he produced "Germania at Watch by the Sea", but it never became as popular as the original. Clasen died in 1899 in Leipzig.

== Selected writings ==
- Lagerscenen, gesammelt auf dem Manöver zu Salzkotten, (Camp Scenes, Collected on Maneuvers in Salzkotten...a Humorous Essay), 1836
- Des Kunstfreundes Reiseabenteuer (An Art-Friendly Travel Adventure), Hoffmann & Campe 1847 (Published under the name "Lorenz Hempel") Full Text online @ Google Books
- Der Einzug des Teufels in Leipzig, von einem Inspirirten – ein Büchlein für Kluge und Dumme (The Entry of the Devil into Leipzig...an Inspirational Book for the Wise and Foolish), originally confiscated on grounds that it "offended the church", but later reissued.
- Erlebtes und Verwebtes; aus der Schreibmappe eines Malers. (The Everyday and the Strange: From a Painter's Notebook), Novellas.
