= Imperial Constitution campaign =

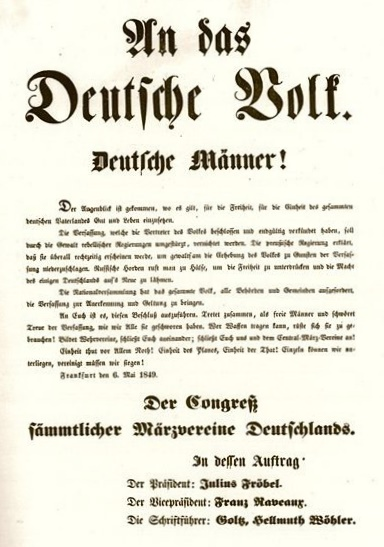
Proclamation of the Central March Union dated 6 May 1849

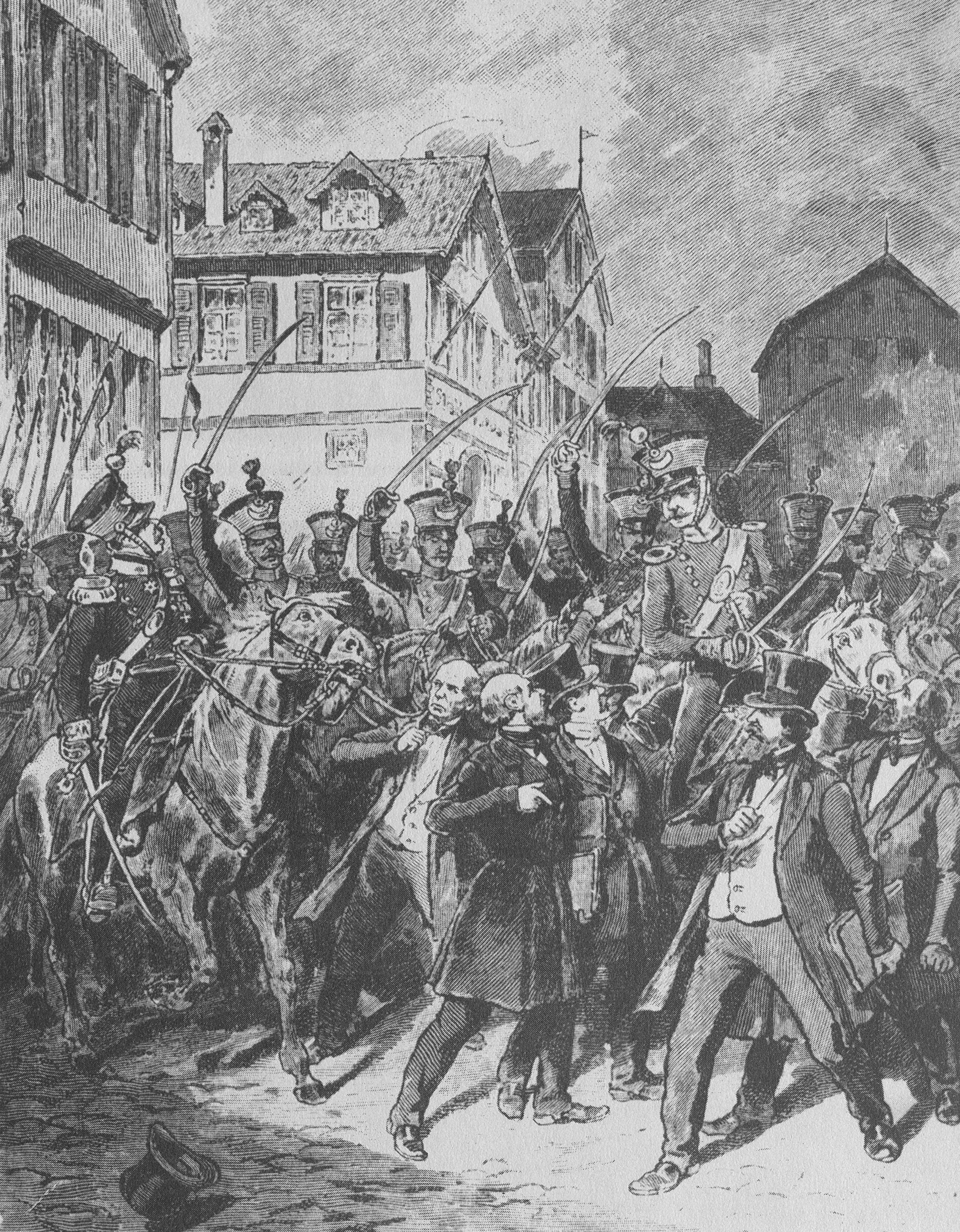
Illustration of the dissolution of the rump parliament on 18 June 1849 in Stuttgart: Württemberg dragoons drive apart a demonstration by the banned MPs (1893 book illustration)

The Imperial Constitution campaign (

German: Reichsverfassungskampagne) was an initiative driven by radical democratic activists in Germany in the mid-19th century that began as grassroots support for the democratically elected Frankfurt Parliament, but soon developed into civil war-like fighting in several German states, known also as the May Uprisings (Maiaufstände).

On 27 March 1849, the Frankfurt Parliament agreed upon a constitutional monarchic document for Germany, the Frankfurt Constitution. However, on 3 April, King Frederick William IV of Prussia refused to accept the document, stating that it had not been approved by the German princes. Immediately, democratic activists attempted to force the princes to accept the Frankfurt Constitution. On 14 April, twenty-eight German entities (mostly petty states) collectively accepted the constitution, and on 25 April they were joined by William I of Württemberg, who had resisted the Constitution up until a few days before. Meanwhile, the Frankfurt Parliament had refused to modify the text of Constitution to assuage Frederick William, declaring on 11 April and again on 26 April that the German governments ought to accept the Frankfurt Constitution as legitimately adopted by the democratically elected parliament. Abandoned by its most powerful partners, Austria and Russia, the Parliament leaned heavily on mass support. On 4 May, the Parliament called on "the governments, the legislative bodies, the municipalities of the individual states, and the entire German people" to enforce the Constitution.

Events were now accelerating beyond the Parliament's control. Activists in the Rhineland were infuriated to have their petition rejected, and on 3 May they formed a militia, the Elberfeld uprising. On that same day, activists in the Kingdom of Saxony organized against Prussian intervention (May Uprising in Dresden). On 8 May, Heinrich von Gagern and his fellow Frankfurt politicians urged that the Imperial Constitution be achieved by legal means alone without violence, but this order was ignored. However, Gagern also ordered on that day that the Provisorische Zentralgewalt oppose any local government from obtaining outside intervention (that is, Prussian forces) to oppress citizens calling for the Imperial Constitution. The Zentralgewalt's own Reichsverweser objected to this as an illegal order. On 10 May, Gagern resigned entirely. Many bourgeoise or conservative democrats fled Frankfurt, and the city pulled its support from the Parliament, fearing military intervention from nearby Austrian and Prussian garrisons. Germany parliamentarians then formed the so-called Rump Parliament for several weeks in Stuttgart, the capital of the Kingdom of Württemberg, until this assembly, too, was dissolved by force by Württemberg troops. The call for a campaign was supported by Georg Friedrich Kolb, Heinrich Herrmann Riemann and others.

The activists in revolt were quickly joined by others in the then Bavarian Palatinate (Palatine Uprising), in the Prussian provinces of Westphalia (Iserlohner Aufstand von 1849), in Prüm (Prümer Zeughaussturm) and especially in the Grand Duchy of Baden (see Baden Revolution) where, for a short time, a republic was proclaimed. These conflicts against the counter-revolutionaries varied in length and intensity depending on the region. Some lasted until July that year. They marked the end phase of the popular and nationalist March Revolution that had started in March 1848.

With the military defeat of this last rebellion, primarily by Prussian troops, the March Revolution of 1848/1849 in the states of the German Confederation finally ended on 23 July 1849 with the capture of Rastatt Fortress, the last bastion of the Baden revolutionaries, by federal forces under Prussian leadership.
