= Elberfeld uprising =

The Elberfeld uprising was one of the revolutionary movements in Germany in 1849 that was a part of the wider German Constitution campaign. The campaign was being done in defense of the Frankfurt Parliament's imperial constitution. Friedrich Engels participated in the uprising as a barricade leader.

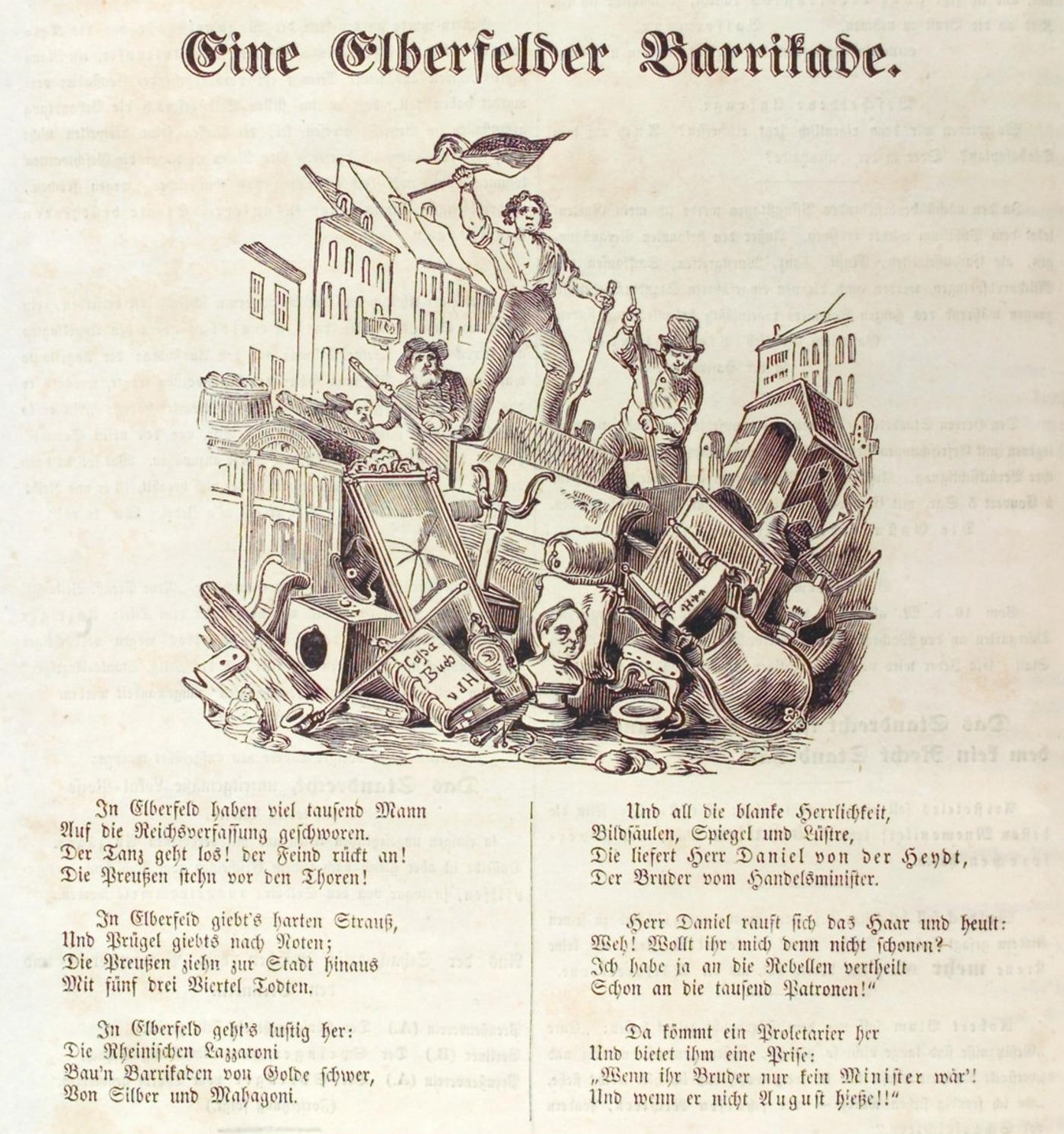
Contemporary depiction and poem printed in German, 1849
