= Carnival society =

German association of carnival enthusiasts

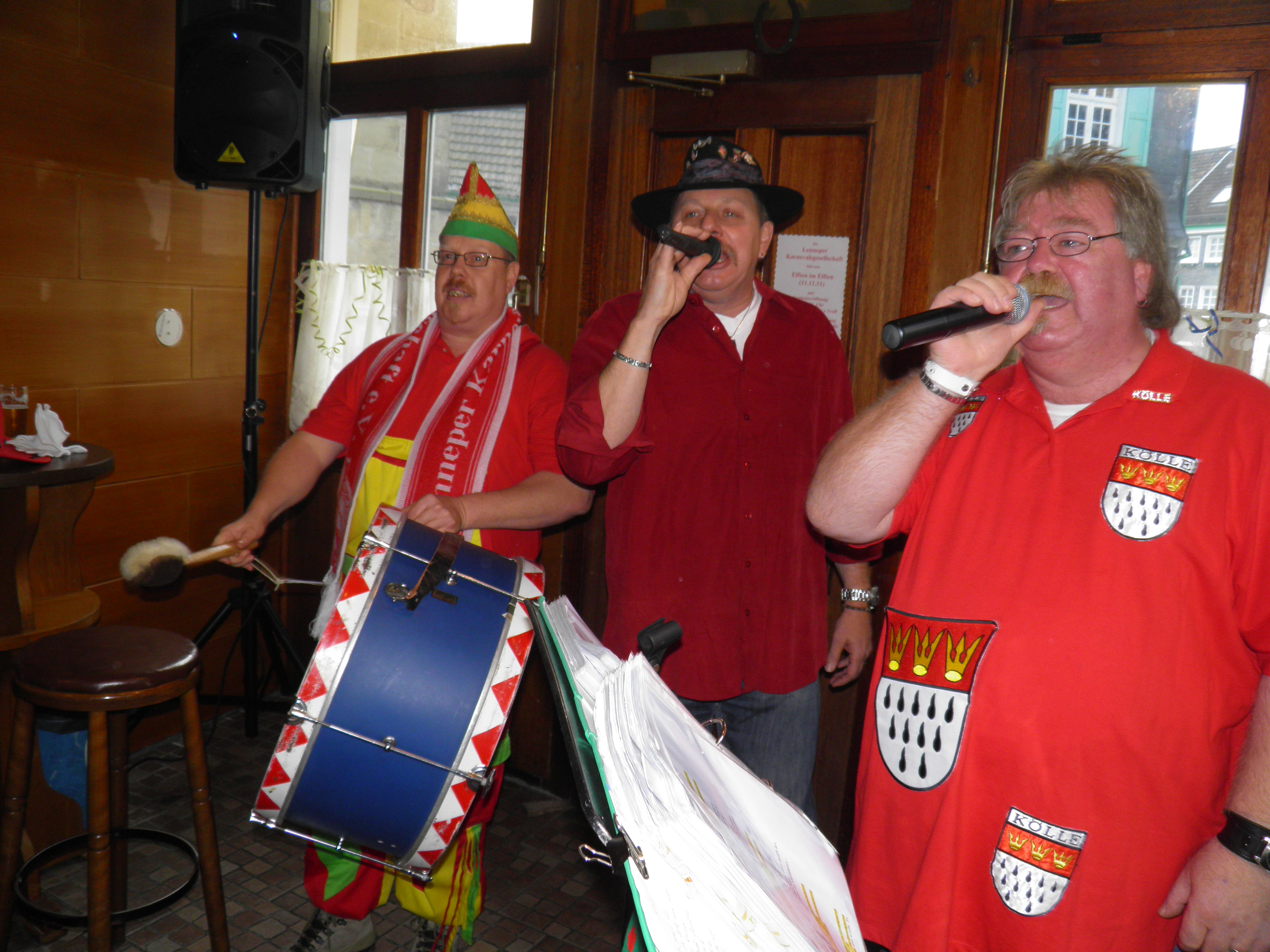
Start of a season at the Lennep carnival society with President Gunther Brockmann at the drum

A carnival society (also known as a carnival club or community) (German: Karnevalsverein) is a German association of carnival enthusiasts who organize and celebrate events related to carnival. In Cologne, a distinction is made between committee and corps societies as well as the "Veedelsvereine" (carnival clubs of the city's districts).

The carnival associations are organizers of the carnival season. They also organize the carnival procession, the local street carnival, Altweiberkarneval (German for 'old women's carnival') and joint visits to foreign carnival events. The season starts on November 11 at 11:11 am, and the clubs celebrate with music in public places, in restaurants and halls. Also known as the "Fifth Season", it finishes on Ash Wednesday of the following year with the main festivities happening around Rose Monday (Rosenmontag).

== Background ==
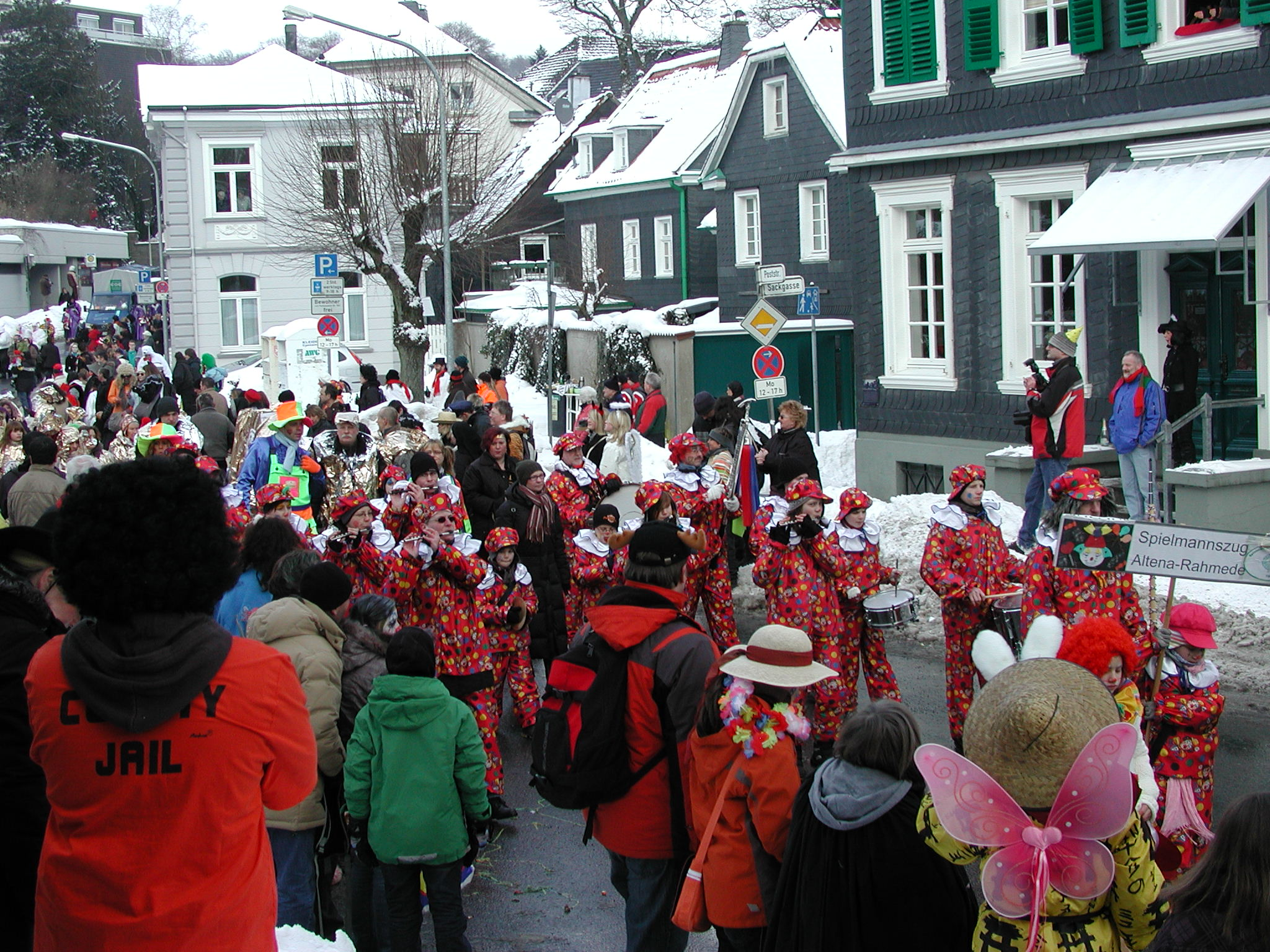
Procession of the Lennep carnival society

The aim of the associations is the maintenance of traditional carnival customs, and is recognized as non-profit in Germany. In Rhineland, the committee that organizes the events in each town consists of a president and 10 junior members and is called the "Council of Eleven" or Elferrat. The number eleven, elf in German, is significant in Carneval celebrations because it is an acronym for the French Revolution values of egalité, liberté, fraternité.

In 1381, Adolf III founded the Geselschap van den Gecken together with thirty-five knights and noblemen. This is considered as the first carnival society. They elected a king and six councilors from among themselves who took over the foolish regiment during the carnival season. Court was held for seven days up to Rose Monday and the service was attended together on Shrove Tuesday. Members were required to wear a badge depicting a fool throughout the year – the first carnival order. Those who forgot to do so had to pay a fine, which was donated to those in need. The carnival society of the Cologne Fools' Guild still refers to Count Adolf to this day.

Carnival clubs are found primarily in the Rhineland and Westphalia, but also in other regions and even abroad. There are umbrella organizations of carnival clubs (e.g. in Saarland), Thuringia and Baden. The oldest of the Cologne societies is the Die Grosse von 1823, which is said to have been founded in 1823 in the Weinwirtschaft Im Häuschen. The oldest corps companies is the Rote Funken. Allegedly, the Cologne city soldiers who dressed in red and white, served as a model. They served between 1660 and 1794, and were considered the worst soldiers of all time. Subsequently, they were disbanded by Napoleon.

== See also ==
- Comparsa
- Krewe
- Samba school
- Second line (parades)
- New Years Associations
