= Georg Saal =

German painter (1817–1870)

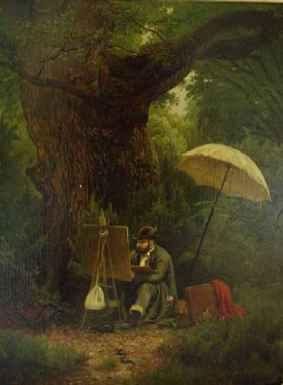
Self-portrait with Easel in the Forest at Fontainebleau (1858)

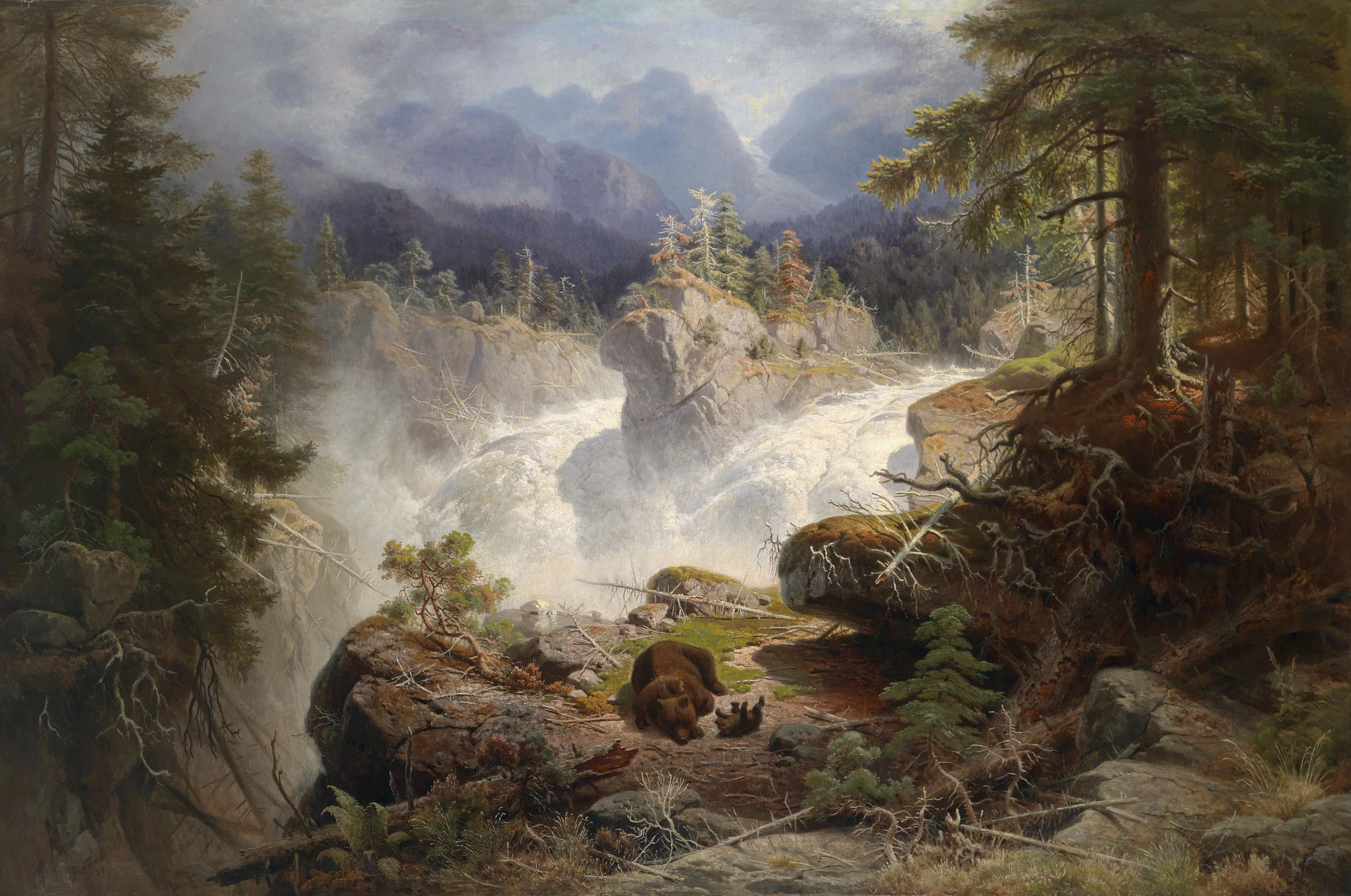
Family of Bears in a Mountain Landscape

Georg Eduard Otto Saal (11 March 1817 – 3 October 1870) was a German painter; known primarily for his landscapes of Norway, although he worked in a wide variety of genres.

== Biography ==
He was born in Koblenz, where his father was a clerk for the city government. He received his first drawing lessons from Konrad Zick. By the time of Zick's death, Saal was proficient enough to work on the reconstruction project at the ruins of Stolzenfels Castle. From 1842 to 1846, he attended the Kunstakademie Düsseldorf, where he studied landscape painting with Johann Wilhelm Schirmer and architecture with Rudolf Wiegmann.

This was followed by travels to the Eifel mountains, the Lahn River and the Black Forest. His friend from the Akademie, Hans Gude, aroused his interest in Norway, so he spent several months there travelling with August Leu and August Becker. When he returned, the paintings he had created impressed Wilhelm von Schadow, who took him into his Master Class.

In 1848, he moved to Heidelberg. He returned to Norway in 1850, visited Switzerland in 1852 and, in 1853, Bavaria. Although he created works that were described as scenes of Greenland, it seems unlikely that he actually went there.

Following his marriage in 1853, he relocated to Baden-Baden, where he had been named court painter to Grand Duke Louis II. He remained there for the rest of his life, although he also maintained a residence in Paris after 1857 and became involved with the Barbizon school. In 1864, he made an extended trip to Savoy and England.

In 1869, he suffered a stroke, but recovered. The following year, at the beginning of the Siege of Paris, he rushed home and died of a second stroke shortly after arriving.
