= Carl Jungheim =

German painter (1830–1886)

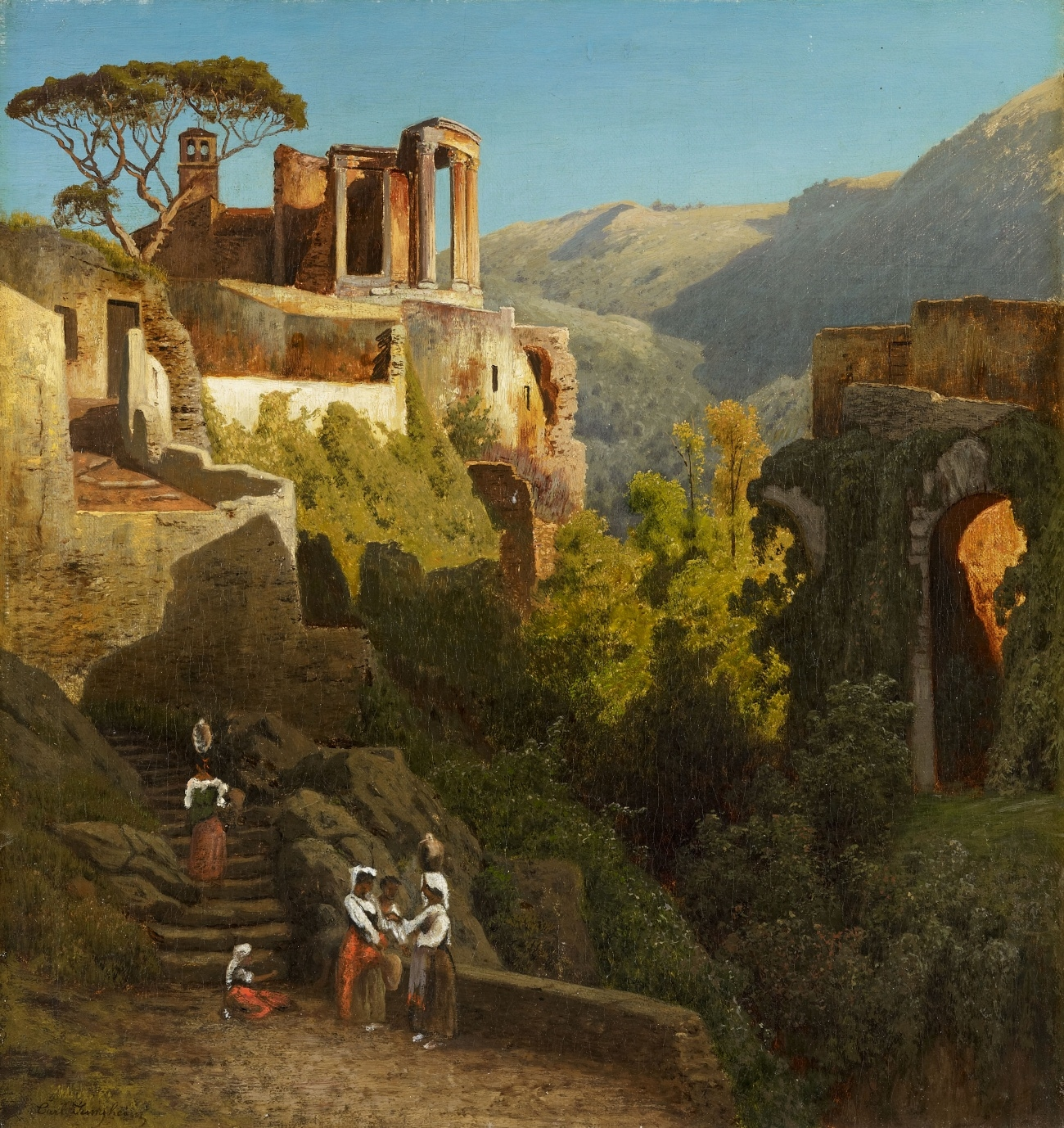
View of the Temple of Vesta, Tivoli

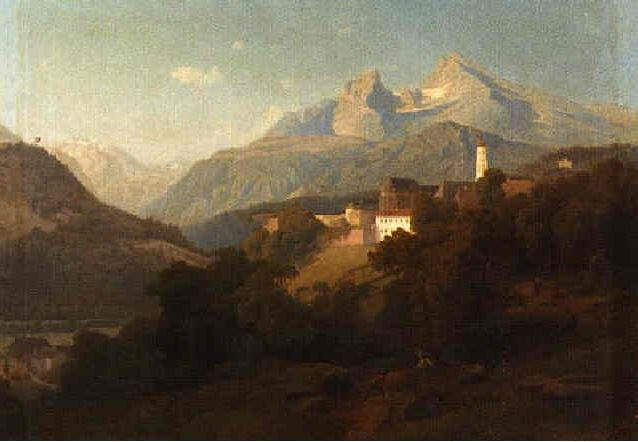
View of Berchtesgaden

Carl Jungheim (6 February 1830, Düsseldorf – 6 June 1886, Düsseldorf) was a German landscape painter, associated with the Düsseldorfer Malerschule.

== Biography ==
From 1847 to 1852, he studied at the Kunstakademie Düsseldorf with Friedrich Wilhelm von Schadow and the landscape painter, Johann Wilhelm Schirmer. He then took several study trips to Switzerland, Tyrolia and Italy (1856), where he travelled in the company of his fellow painters, August Leu and Albert Flamm. He initially focused on painting mountain scenes from the Alps and the Harz range. His later work displays a preference for Italian landscapes and shows the influence of Oswald Achenbach.

One of his earliest exhibitions was in 1858 at the Kunstverein in Hamburg. At the 1873 Vienna World's Fair, he was represented with three paintings. He also gave private lessons. Among his notable students were Luise Jansen, Marie Egner, Bertha von Grab, Wilhelm Degode and the Swiss artist, Friedrich Rudolf von Frisching, For the latter part of his life, he was an active member of the artists' association, "Malkasten".

His son, Julius Jungheim also became a well known landscape painter.
