= August Becker (painter) =

German painter (1821–1887)

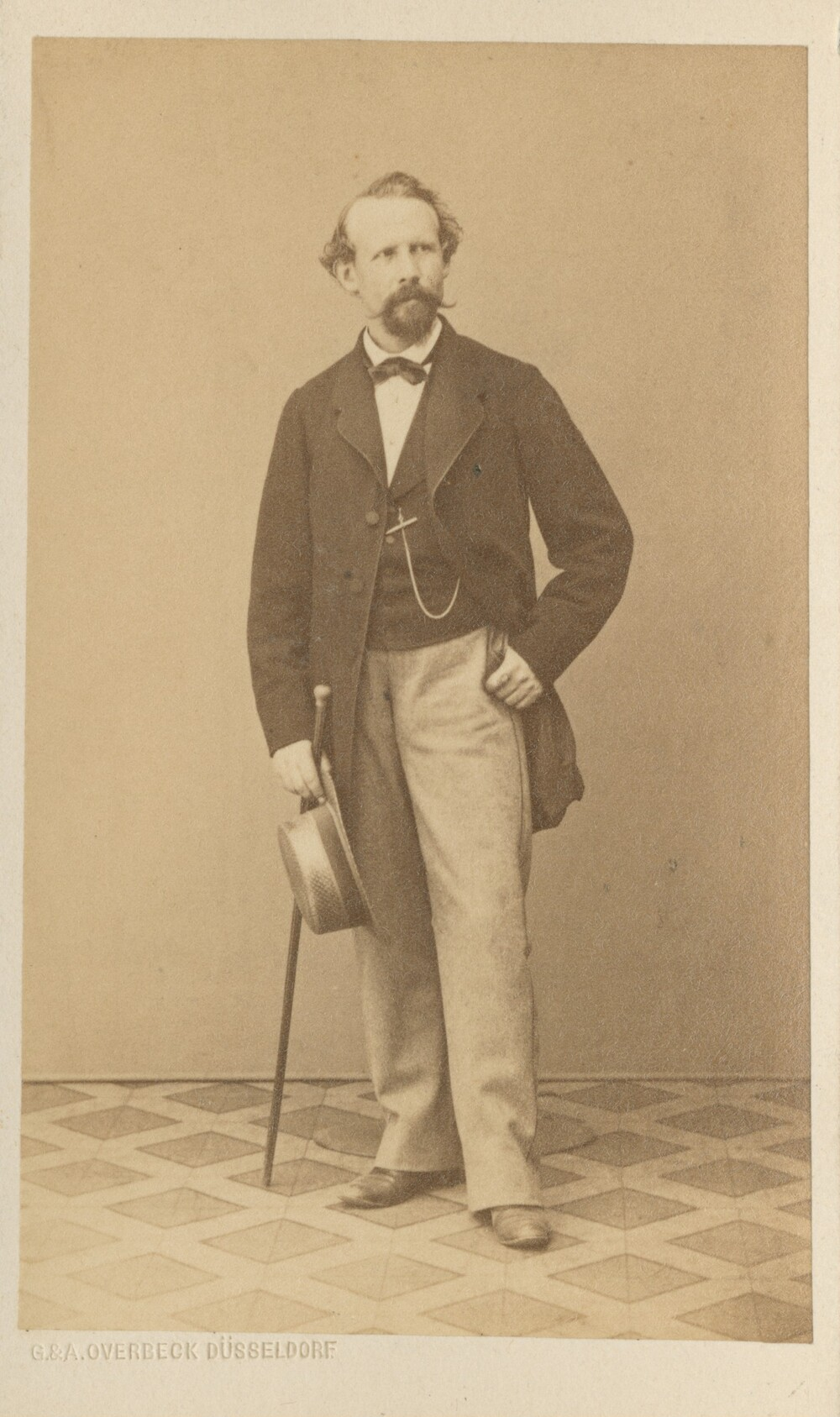
August Becker by G. & A. Overbeck (firm), c. 1868

August Becker (27 January 1821 – 19 December 1887) was a German landscape painter; associated with the Düsseldorfer Malerschule.

== Life and work ==
He was born in Darmstadt. He began his studies in 1837, with the court painter, Johann Heinrich Schilbach. His first study trips took him through Fischbachtal, Rüdesheim and the Nahe region. In 1840, he attended the landscape painting classes taught by Johann Wilhelm Schirmer at the Kunstakademie Düsseldorf. He remained there after completing his courses, because Düsseldorf provided a profitable market for his art.

In 1844 and 1847, together with August Leu and Georg Saal, he visited Norway; painting a series of fjordscapes. In 1854, he stayed in London for several weeks to study the museums. His brother, Ernst, had been serving there as a librarian and Royal Tutor since 1851. A meeting was arranged with Prince Albert, who purchased Becker's painting "The Jungfrau", as a gift for Queen Victoria. In the years to come, she acquired more paintings and, in 1864, invited him to visit Scotland. In 1869, he paid a brief visit to her estate, Osborne House, on the Isle of Wight.

He later toured Hungary (1876) and Romania (1882), where his visit was related to commissions he had received from the Hohenzollern-Sigmaringen family. While there, he also gave painting lessons to Princess Antonia.

He died in 1887 in Düsseldorf. His total oeuvre comprises over 360 paintings, about 80 of which are in England. In October, 2002, a major retrospective of his works was held at the Kunst Archiv Darmstadt.

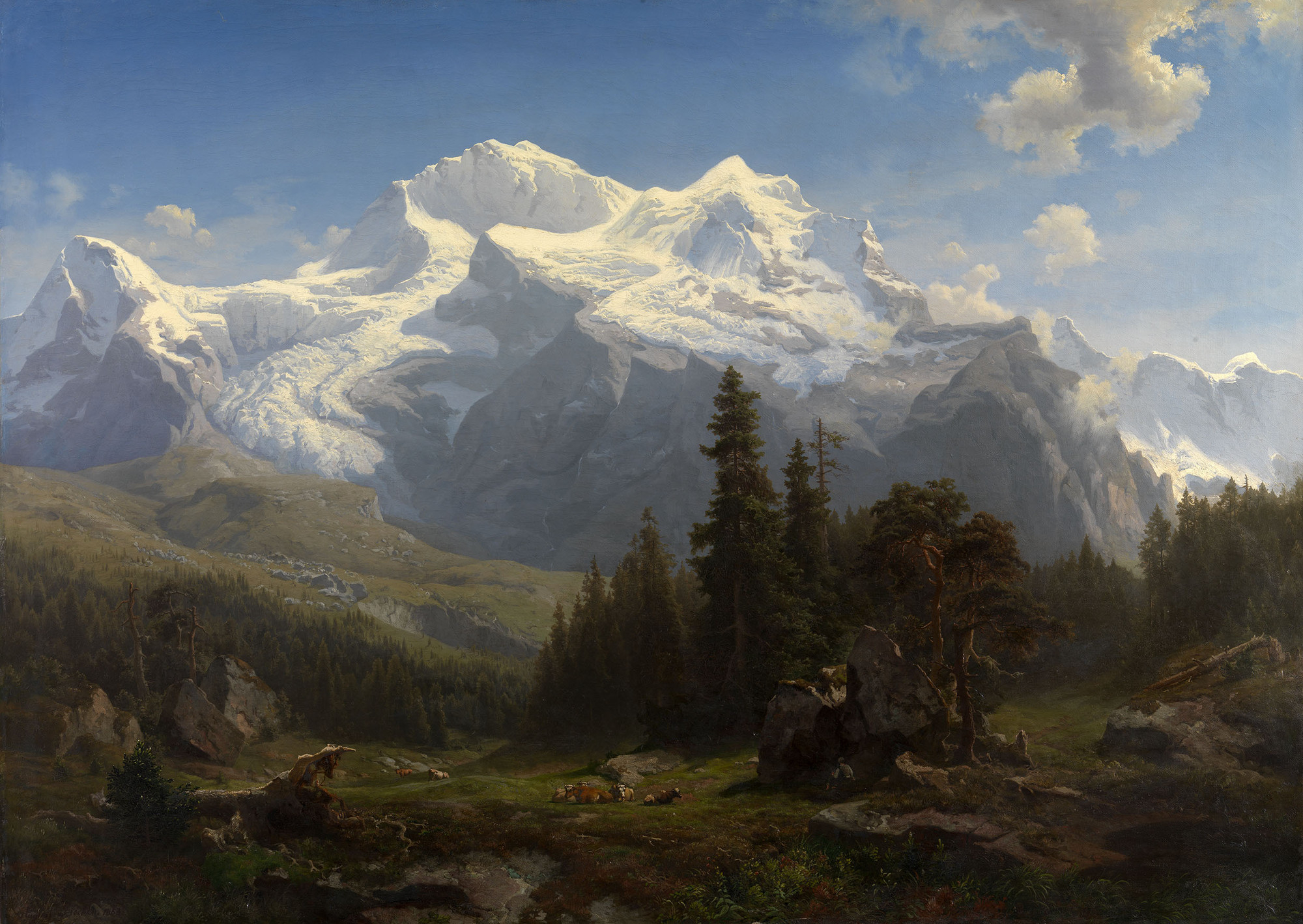
The Jungfrau
