= Johann Heinrich Schilbach =

German painter (1798–1851)

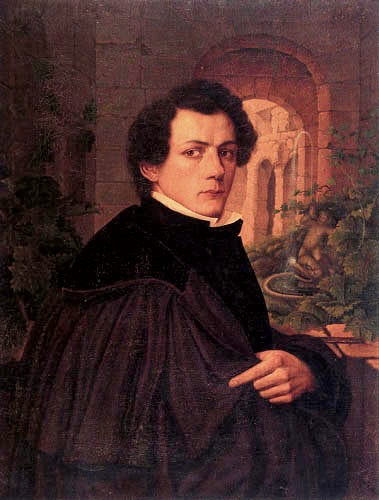
Self-portrait (date unknown)

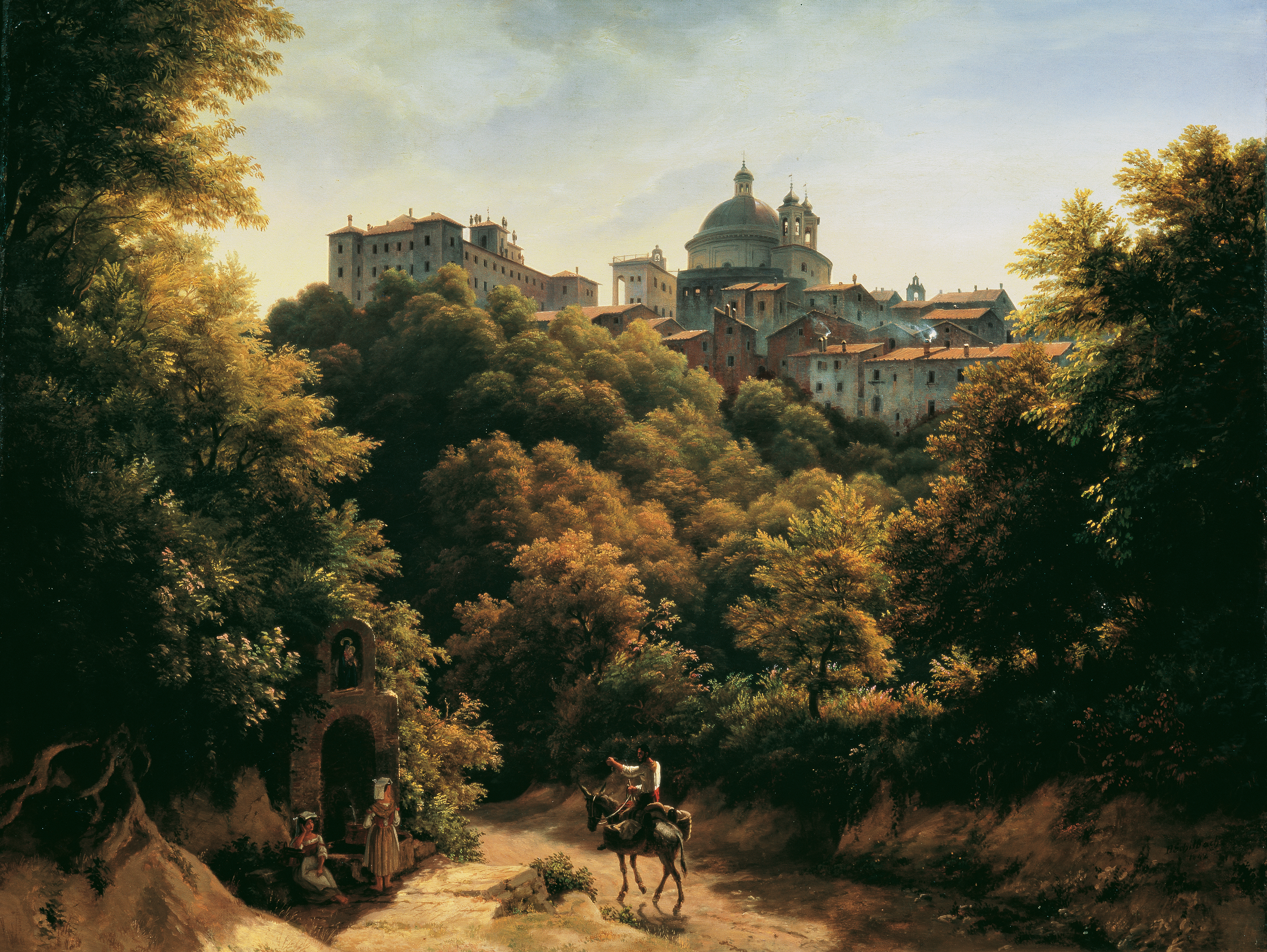
View of Ariccia

Johann Heinrich Schilbach (28 September 1798, Barchfeld – 9 May 1851, Darmstadt) was a German landscape painter.

== Life and work ==
He studied in Darmstadt with the landscape painter, Johann Georg Primavesi. In 1818, he took an extended study trip throughout Switzerland. His drawings and engravings from that trip were published in Bern by Johann Peter Lamy, under the title Souvenirs Suisse.

A scholarship from the Grand Duchy of Hesse enabled him to study in Italy. In 1823, he and his friend, the painter Ernst Fries, went to Rome, where he made the acquaintance of Ludwig Richter. He and Richter hiked together through the Monti Sabini and reached Naples in 1825. Shortly after, he climbed Vesuvius, with a team consisting of Richter, Carl Götzloff, Friedrich Ludwig von Maydell, and several other artists.

Back in Rome, he became a sought-after painter of landscapes and vedute. During his five years in Italy, he developed a free style that focused on nature. He returned to Germany with over 400 sheets of sketches, drawings and watercolors, many of which he later rendered in oil.

in 1828, he became a court painter, primarily for the theatre. He also took students, including August Weber and August Becker. Two years later, he married Philippine Catharina Cramer; daughter of the businessman, Johann Christoph Cramer. They had eight children. In 1833, he was one of the co-founders of the Kunstverein Darmstadt (artists' association). He also continued to travel, notably through the Black Forest to Switzerland with Johann Wilhelm Schirmer. In 1843, he went to the Bavarian Alps and the Salzkammergut by way of Munich. On his travels he created numerous studies in oil with daily notes.

== Sources ==
- Johann Heinrich Schilbach (1798–1851). Der Traum vom Süden. Zeichnungen, Ölstudien und Gemälde. Exhibition catalog, Hessisches Landesmuseum Darmstadt, 2000, ISBN 3-9332-5714-X
- Jens Christian Jensen: Aquarelle und Zeichnungen der deutschen Romantik. DuMont Buchverlag, Cologne, 1992, pg.184, ISBN 3-7701-0976-7
- Andrea Tietze (2005). "Schilbach, Johann Heinrich". Neue Deutsche Biographie (in German). Vol. 22. Berlin: Duncker & Humblot. pp. 754–755. (full text online).
- Bernd Krimmel, Elisabeth Krimmel, Thomas Reinheimer: Heinrich Schilbach, Studien nach der Natur, Liebig, Darmstadt 1984.
