= Hans von Volkmann =

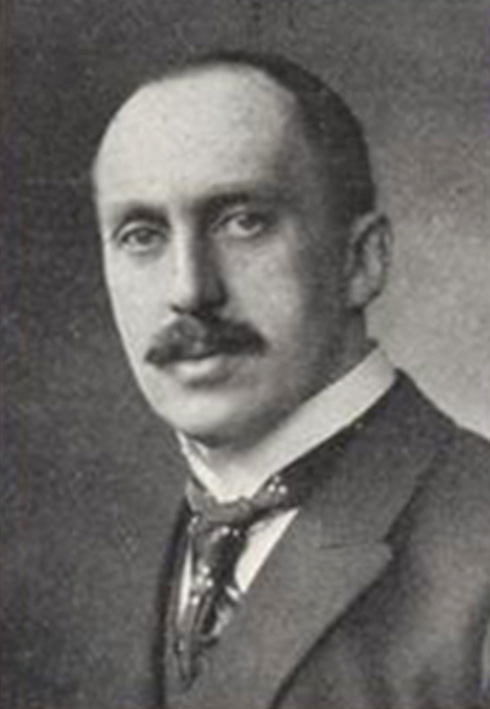
Hans von Volkmann in 1904

Hans Richard von Volkmann (19 May 1860, Halle - 29 April 1927, Halle) was a German illustrator and landscape painter, associated with the Düsseldorfer Malerschule.

== Biography ==
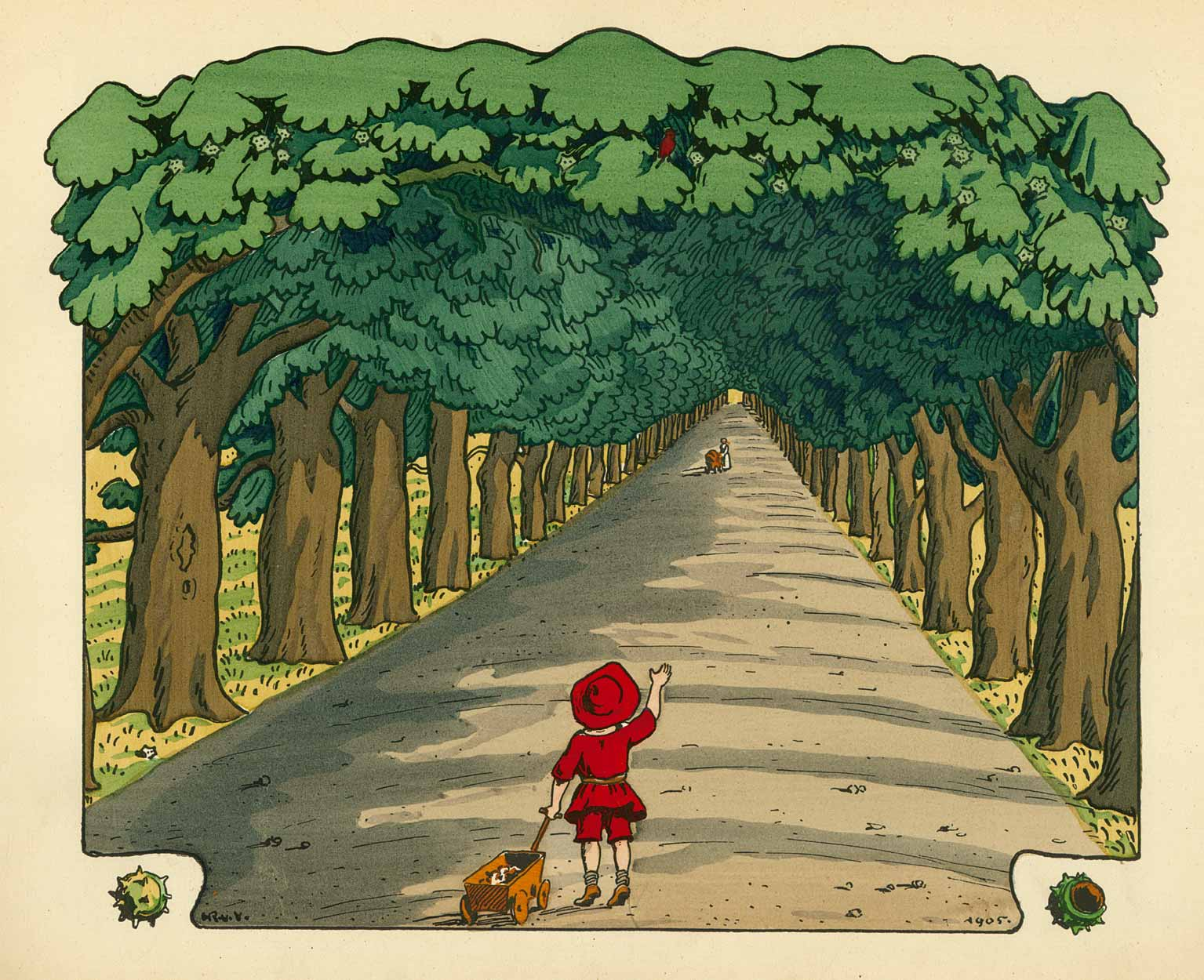
Strabantzerchen (Rompers)

His father, Richard von Volkmann, was a well known surgeon and occasional author. By the age of fourteen, he was already roaming the areas around Halle with a pencil and paint box. Many of his early watercolors are still in the possession of the Halle state archives.

After completing his primary education, he enrolled at the Kunstakademie Düsseldorf, where he studied from 1880 to 1888. His primary instructors there were Hugo Crola, Heinrich Lauenstein, Johann Peter Theodor Janssen and Eduard von Gebhardt. During this time, he became a member of the progressive artists' association, Malkasten. From 1888 to 1892, he was in Karlsruhe, as master student of the landscape painter, Gustav Schönleber, who would be his primary influence. His first sale was in 1890, to a friend of his father's, Dr. Eduard Hertzberg.

He made extensive painting excursions throughout Central and Southern Germany. In 1893, he paid a visit to the Riviera. Despite these travels, Halle would be his artistic home base for the rest of his life. Later, he joined the Deutscher Künstlerbund and participated in their first exhibit in 1904, at Munich's Staatliche Antikensammlungen.

His second home was the artists' colony in Willingshausen. He first went there in 1883 and, for the next twenty-five years, was there every summer. From 1907 to 1910, he lived there with his wife and children. He would do so again from 1924 to 1926.

He died in his home town, three days after returning from a trip. In 1928, the city of Halle presented a major retrospective of his work. In addition to his relatively simple landscapes, he also illustrated sixty-two children's books; some of them written by his father under the pen name "Richard Leander".

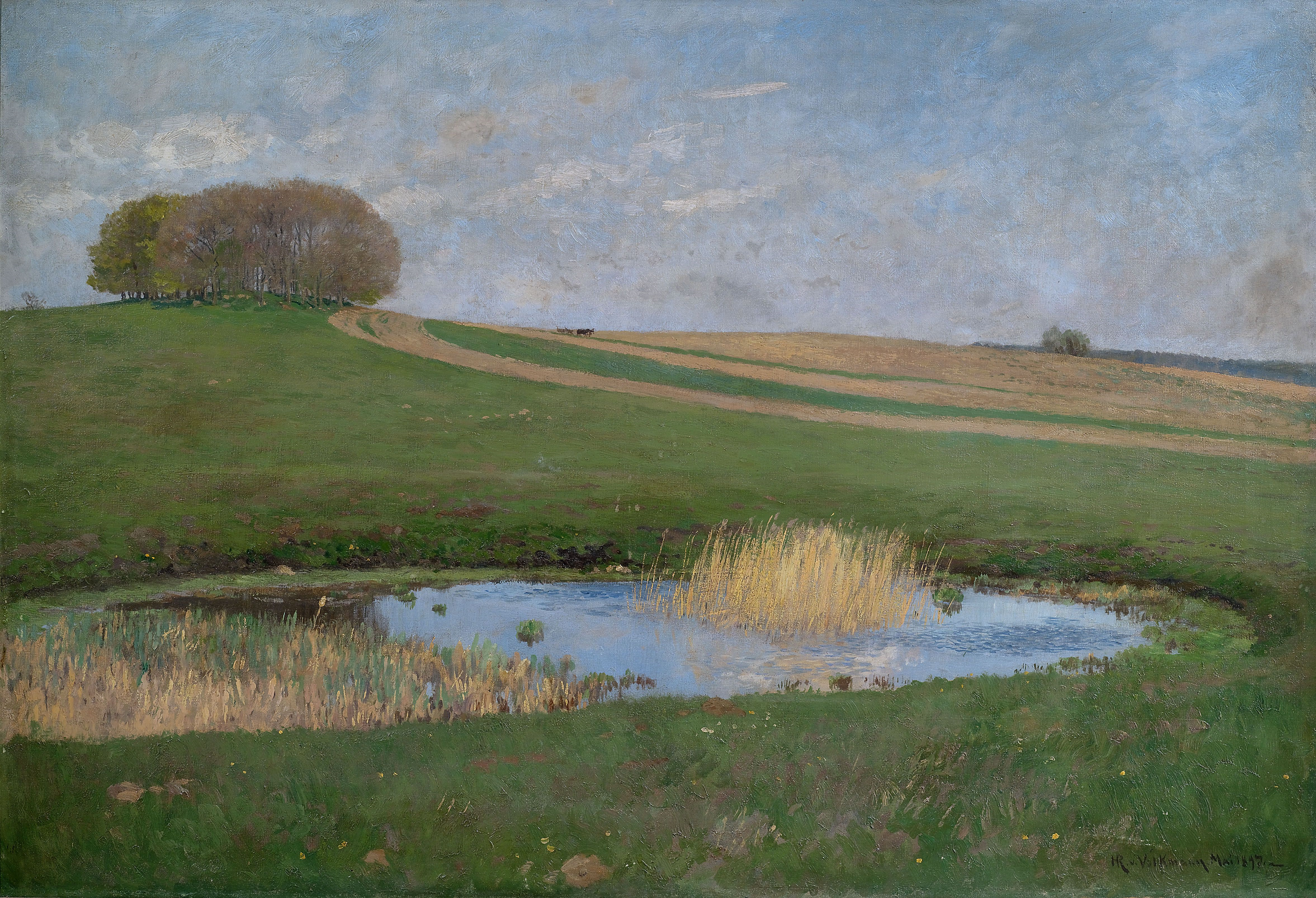
Summer Landscape with a Pond
