= Richard von Volkmann =

German surgeon and author (1830–1889)

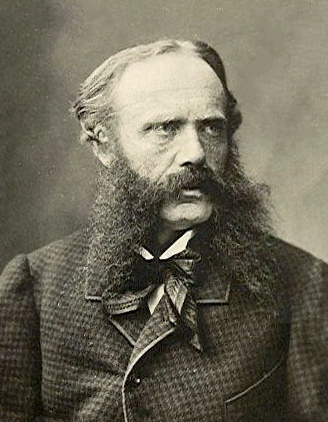
Richard von Volkmann c. 1880

Richard von Volkmann (17 August 1830 – 28 November 1889) was a German surgeon and writer of poetry and fiction. Some of his works were illustrated by his son, Hans, a well known artist.

== Biography ==
He was born in Leipzig on 17 August 1830, the son of physiologist A.W. Volkmann. Richard entered medical school in Berlin and graduated in 1854. In 1867 he was appointed Professor of Surgery and Director of the Surgical Clinic at Halle where he remained until retirement. He was one of the most prominent surgeons of his day. He died in Jena.

== Achievements ==
- Performed the first excision of carcinoma of the rectum in 1878.
- Described Volkmann's Ischaemic Contracture in 1881.
- Devised a splint and a spoon which bear his name.
- His treatment of articular tuberculosis heralded attempts at preventive surgery.
- In 1894 he described three patients with scrotal cancer who worked with paraffin and tar.
- He was an early supporter of Joseph Lister, and helped the introduction of antiseptic surgery throughout Germany.
- He invented the surgical retractor, now known as the Volkmann retractor.

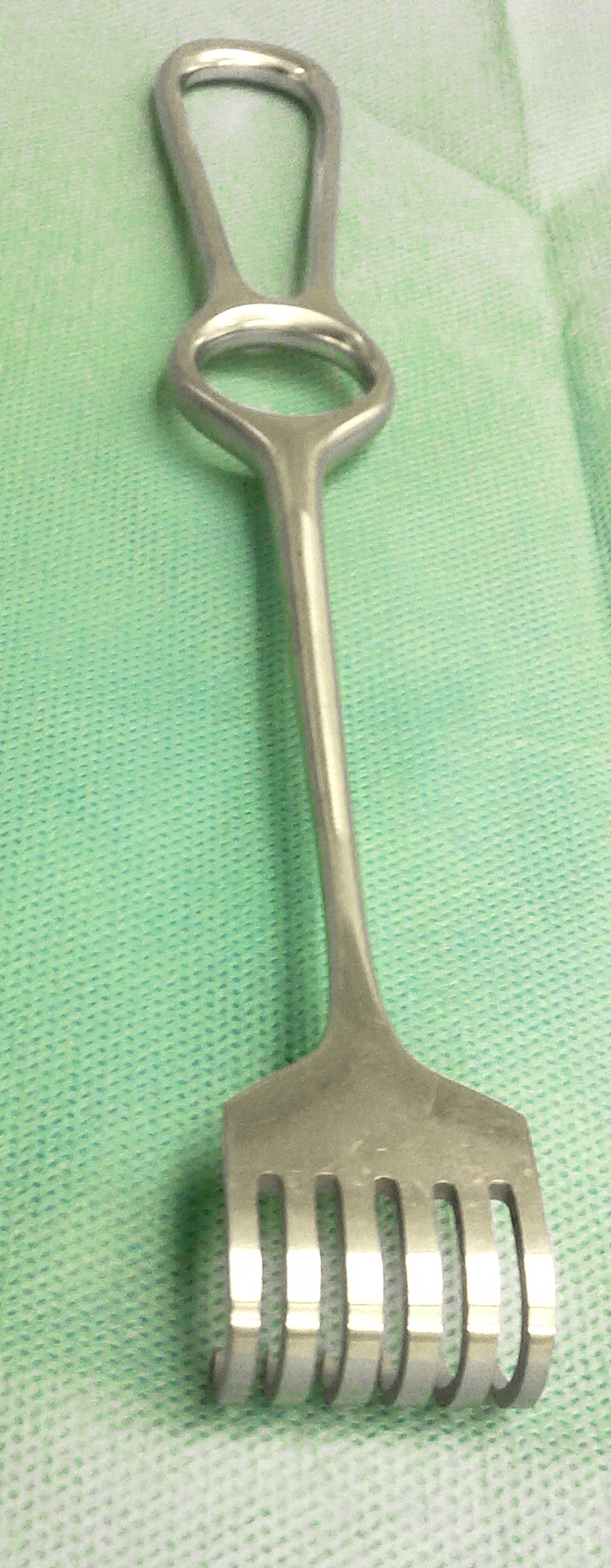
Volkmann rectractor

== Writings ==
He edited (1870–89) Beiträge zur Chirurgie, and contributed to Franz von Pitha and Theodor Billroth's Handbuch der Chirurgie a section on diseases of the locomotory organs (1865–72). He wrote Bemerkungen über einige vom Krebs zu trennende Geschwülste (1858).

Under the pseudonym Richard Leander, he wrote:

- Träumereien an französischen Kaminen (Reveries at French hearths, 1871; 24th ed. 1894), a work for young people
- Aus der Burschenzeit (From boyhood, 1876)
- Gedichte (Poems, 3d ed. 1885)
- Kleine Geschichten (Little stories, 2d ed. 1888)
- Alte und neue Troubadourlieder (Old and new troubador songs, 2d ed. 1890)

== Sources ==
- Firkin, B.G.; Whitworth, J.A. (1987). Dictionary of Medical Eponyms. Parthenon Publishing. ISBN 1-85070-333-7.
- Gilman, D. C.; Peck, H. T.; Colby, F. M., eds. (1905). "Volkmann, Richard von" . New International Encyclopedia (1st ed.). New York: Dodd, Mead. This work in turn cites:
  - Krause, Zur Erinnerung an Richard von Volkmann (Berlin, 1890)
- Rines, George Edwin, ed. (1920). "Volkmann, Richard von" . Encyclopedia Americana.
