= Theodor Martens =

German artist (1822–1884)

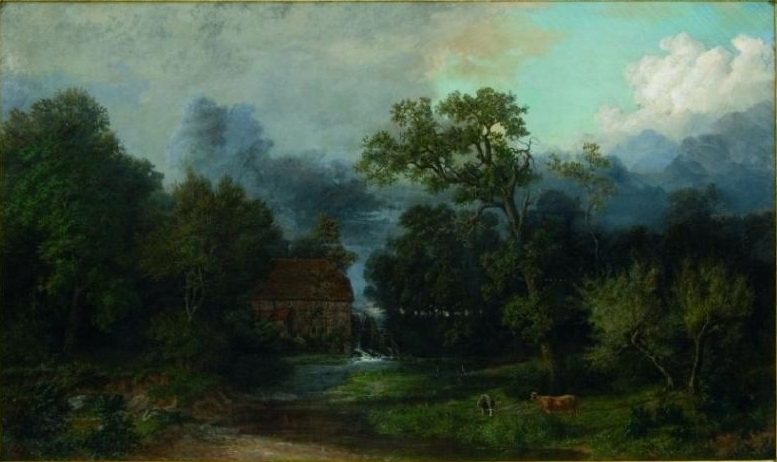
Watermill in Mecklenburg

Theodor Martens (August 27, 1822, – October 1, 1884) was a German artist.

== Life and work ==
Martens was born in Wismar, Germany. He had nine children. He resided in Düsseldorf, Paris, Hamburg, Schwerin and Portici, in addition to Wismar. Martens worked as a merchant until age 40 when he took up art as his full-time vocation. Martens studied with August Weber in Düsseldorf and Émile Lambinet in Paris.

His work was especially influenced by the Barbizon school masters such as Corot, Daubigny and Diaz. In 1874 he received a silver medal during a show at the London Crystal Palace. He died from cholera in Portici, Italy, aged 62.

His paintings are in a realistic style that anticipates the impressionists to follow. Many landscapes and architectural subjects are included in his work. His works were considered very modern by contemporaries. Many examples of his work may be found today at the Schwerin State Art Museum in Schwerin, Germany and in Schwerin Castle in that northern German city.

A painting by Martens was sold July 6, 2004, at auction at Bonhams in London for $790 (US) it was a 27.5 by 35 centimeter oil titled "A river at dusk", the auction report did not disclose a date for the painting.

== Sources ==
- Friedrich Schlie: Beschreibendes Verzeichniss der Werke neuerer Meister in der Grossherzoglichen Gemälde-Gallerie zu Schwerin. Druck der Bärensprungschen Hofbuchdruckerei, Schwerin 1884 (archive.org)
- Grewolls, Grete (2011). Wer war wer in Mecklenburg und Vorpommern. Das Personenlexikon (in German). Rostock: Hinstorff Verlag. p. 6349. ISBN 978-3-356-01301-6.
- Martens, Theodor. In: Hermann Alexander Müller: Biographisches Künstler-Lexikon. Verlag des Bibliographischen Instituts, Leipzig 1882, pg.355 (retrobibliothek.de).
