= Wilhelm Degode =

German painter (1862–1931)

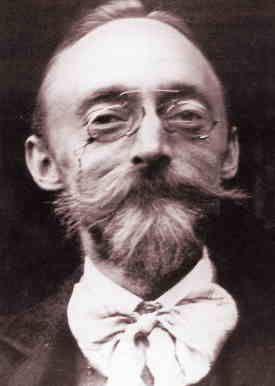
- Born: February 6, 1862; Oldenburg, Kingdom of Prussia
- Died: November 26, 1931 (aged 69)
- Education: Kunstakademie Düsseldorf
- Known for: Landscape painting

Georg Wilhelm Degode (6 February 1862 – 26 November 1931) was a German landscape painter and photographer; associated with the Düsseldorfer Malerschule.

== Biography ==
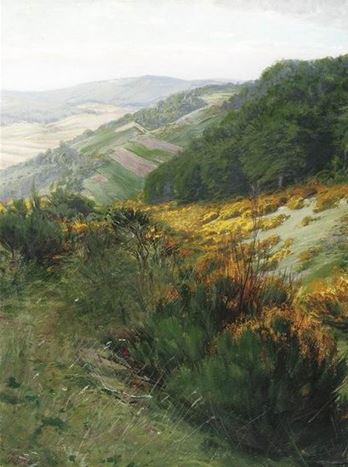
Eifel Landscape with Blooming Ginster

Degode was born in Oldenburg to a family of merchants, and was originally intended to follow in that profession. At the age of thirteen, he persuaded them to let him take drawing lessons from the curator at a local art gallery. After completing his secondary education, in 1881, he gained the support of his mother to attend the Kunstakademie Düsseldorf. His initial teachers were Heinrich Lauenstein and Hugo Crola. Later, he studied with Carl Jungheim, Heinrich Deiters and Eugen Dücker, as well as taking private lessons.

At first, he shared a home and studio with Hermann Emil Pohle. In 1884, he took his first study trip through Eifel, from Malmedy to the Moselle Valley. Between then and 1927, he would make twenty-one such trips to the area; many in the company of his colleagues. In 1885, he joined the progressive artists' association, Malkasten, and participated in their annual performances. He married Sophie Stüve, from Osnabrück, in 1886. They had two sons and two daughters; the youngest boy and girl were twins.

After 1893, he became a regular visitor to the artists' colony in Willingshausen. In 1898, he purchased a large home in Düsseldorf's Kaisersweth district, originally built as a clerical house in 1704. From 1833 to 1852, it was used as the Town Hall. Under his ownership, it served as a gathering place for most of the prominent artists in the city's art community, as well as writers, including Herbert Eulenberg. Now known as the Degodehaus, it belonged to his descendants until 2015.

In addition to his painting, he was an accomplished amateur photographer and a member of the Düsseldorfer Photovereinigung. He left approximately 3,500 photographic glass plates. He also published a book, Ginstergold. Erzählungen und Bilder aus der Eifel und dem Rheinland um 1900 (Ginstergold: Stories and pictures from the Eifel and the Rhineland around 1900), in which his paintings and photographs were accompanied by local stories and data he had collected himself. It was republished in 2001.

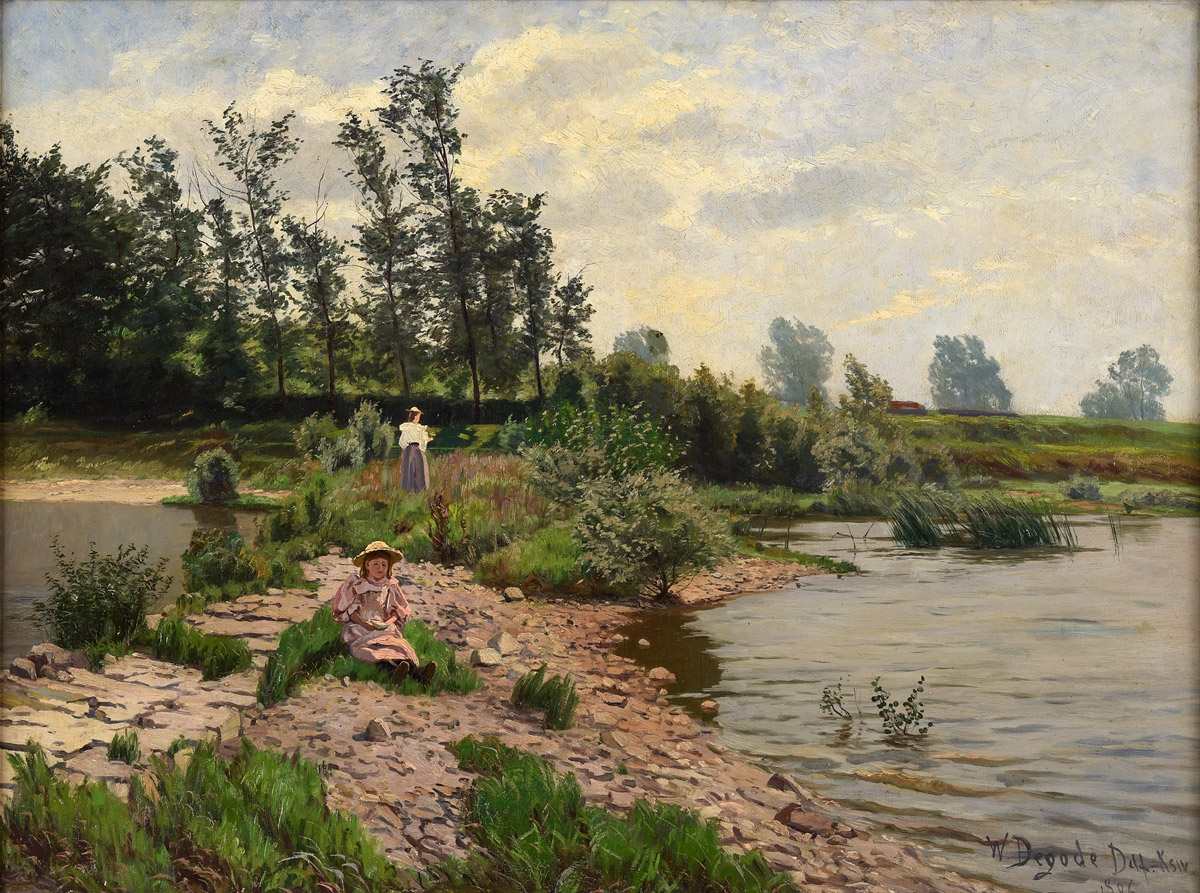
A Summer Day in Kaiserswerth

== Sources ==
- "Degode, Wilhelm", In: Ulrich Thieme (Ed.): Allgemeines Lexikon der Bildenden Künstler von der Antike bis zur Gegenwart, Vol.8: Coutan–Delattre. E. A. Seemann, Leipzig 1912, pg.550 (Online)
- Hans Paffrath (Ed.): Lexikon der Düsseldorfer Malerschule 1819–1918. Vol.1: Abbema–Gurlitt, Kunstmuseum Düsseldorf and the Galerie Paffrath. Bruckmann, 1997, ISBN 3-7654-3009-9
- Anke Degode: Der Kaiserswerther Maler Wilhelm Degode, Düsseldorf 2001, ISBN 3-935221-09-6
