= Julian Klein von Diepold =

German painter

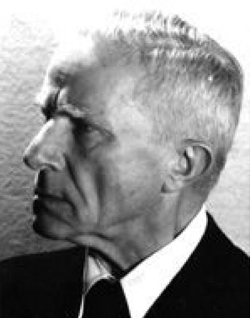
Julian Klein von Diepold (date unknown)

Julian Klein von Diepold (25 January 1868, Dortmund - 20 November 1947, Norderney) was a German landscape and portrait painter, associated with the Düsseldorfer Malerschule.

== Biography ==
He was born to the painter, Friedrich Emil Klein, and his wife, the poet Friederika née Von Diepold. His brothers, Leopold and Maximilian also became painters, while his brother Rudolf was an art critic and historian. In 1873, his family moved to Düsseldorf, where he grew up and received his first painting lessons from his father. In 1886, he enrolled at the Kunstakademie, where he studied with Hugo Crola and Johann Peter Theodor Janssen.

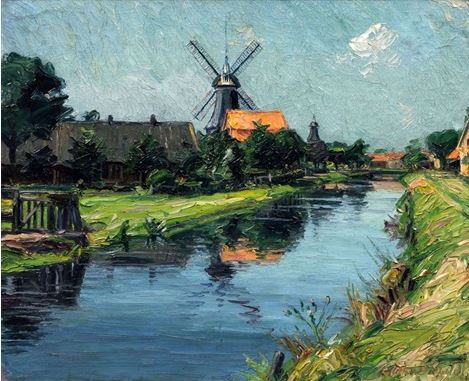
Ostfriesland Landscape

In 1888, he transferred to the Antwerp Academy, where his primary instructor was Charles Verlat. Later, he attended the master classes taught by Juliaan De Vriendt. He also attended a sculpture class from 1890 to 1891. He created his first independent paintings in 1892. He also took a study trip through France, where he discovered the works of the Barbizon School, and several contemporary artists, such as Van Gogh. After 1893, he maintained a studio in Antwerp.

Further stud trips followed; to the Italian Riviera and Florence, where he spent a year trying his hand at sculpting. After a stay in Paris, he returned to Italy in 1896, where he married Ida Bianchi, the daughter of an engineer, and lived in Rome. They had a son and a daughter.

Between 1903 and 1914, they travelled extensively and changed residence several times; from Antwerp to the Taunus, to Frankfurt am Main, where he ran a student workshop. In 1909, he established a studio in Berlin, but was in Genoa by 1910. He and his family lived there until the outbreak of World War I, when they went back to Berlin and he became involved with the German Impressionist movement.

In 1919, he accepted an invitation from Leo Fürbringer, the Mayor of Emden, and discovered the landscapes of Ostfriesland. He spent the year 1923 living near Westerstede. While there, he divorced Ida and remarried, in 1925, to Margarethe Iderhoff, who was from that area. They settled in Norderney and had a son, Manfred, who became a sculptor. Their winters were spent in Berlin or Italy. The studio in Berlin, which housed most of his unsold paintings, was destroyed near the end of World War II. Some of his works may be seen at the Ostfriesisches Landesmuseum Emden.

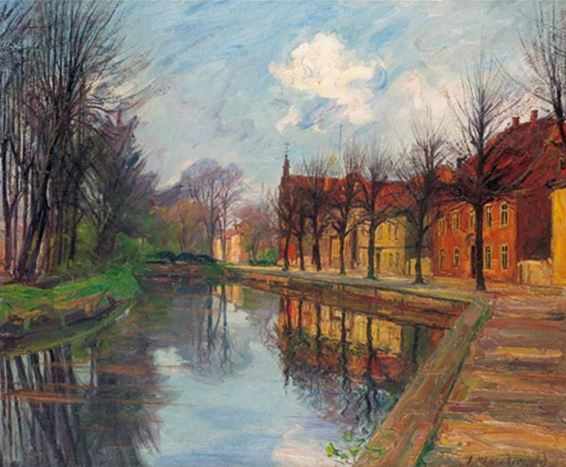
View of Oldenburg

== Sources ==
- Angelika Lasius: Biography of Klein von Diepold @ Ostfriesische Landschaft
- Otto von Ritgen: "Julian Klein von Diepold". In: Velhagen und Klasings Monatshefte, #36, 1921/22, pp. 73–81
- Karl Maertin: "Julian Klein von Diepold, der Maler Ostfrieslands", In: Ostdeutsche Monatshefte, #12, 1931, pp. 341–349
- C. H. Cassens: "Julian Klein von Diepold". In: Jahrbuch der Gesellschaft für bildende Kunst und vaterländische Altertümer zu Emden, #29, 1949, pp. 91–93
- Berend de Vries: "Julian Klein von Diepold". In: Ostfreesland. Ein Kalender für Jedermann, #32, 1949, pp. 97–98
- Hans Wohltmann: "Der Maler Julian Klein von Diepold". In: Jahrbuch der Gesellschaft für bildende Kunst und vaterländische Altertümer zu Emden, #33, 1953, pp. 105–114
