= Bertha von Grab =

- Born: 21 June 1840; Prague
- Died: 18 September 1907 (aged 67); New Town
- Occupation: Painter

Signature
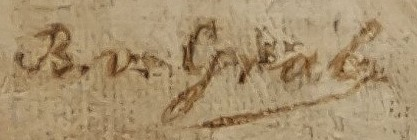

Bertha von Grab (21 June 1840 – 18 September 1907) was a Czech-Austrian landscape painter.

Bertha von Grab was born on 21 June 1840 in Prague. She is thought to be the daughter of Landesgericht Judge Johann Nepomuk Edler von Grab. She studied under August Piepenhagen and Maximilian Haushofer in Prague and Carl Jungheim the Elder in Düsseldorf. She painted alpine scenes of the Upper Bavaria and Austria, forest scenes, and sea and coastal scenes. She regularly exhibited in Düsseldorf from 1873 to 1900, as well as in Vienna (1873, 1879, 1880), Berlin (at the Prussian Academy of Arts Exhibition 1877, 1879, 1883), Munich (at the Glaspalast in 1883), and other German cities.

Bertha von Grab died on 18 September 1907 in New Town of Prague.

== Gallery ==
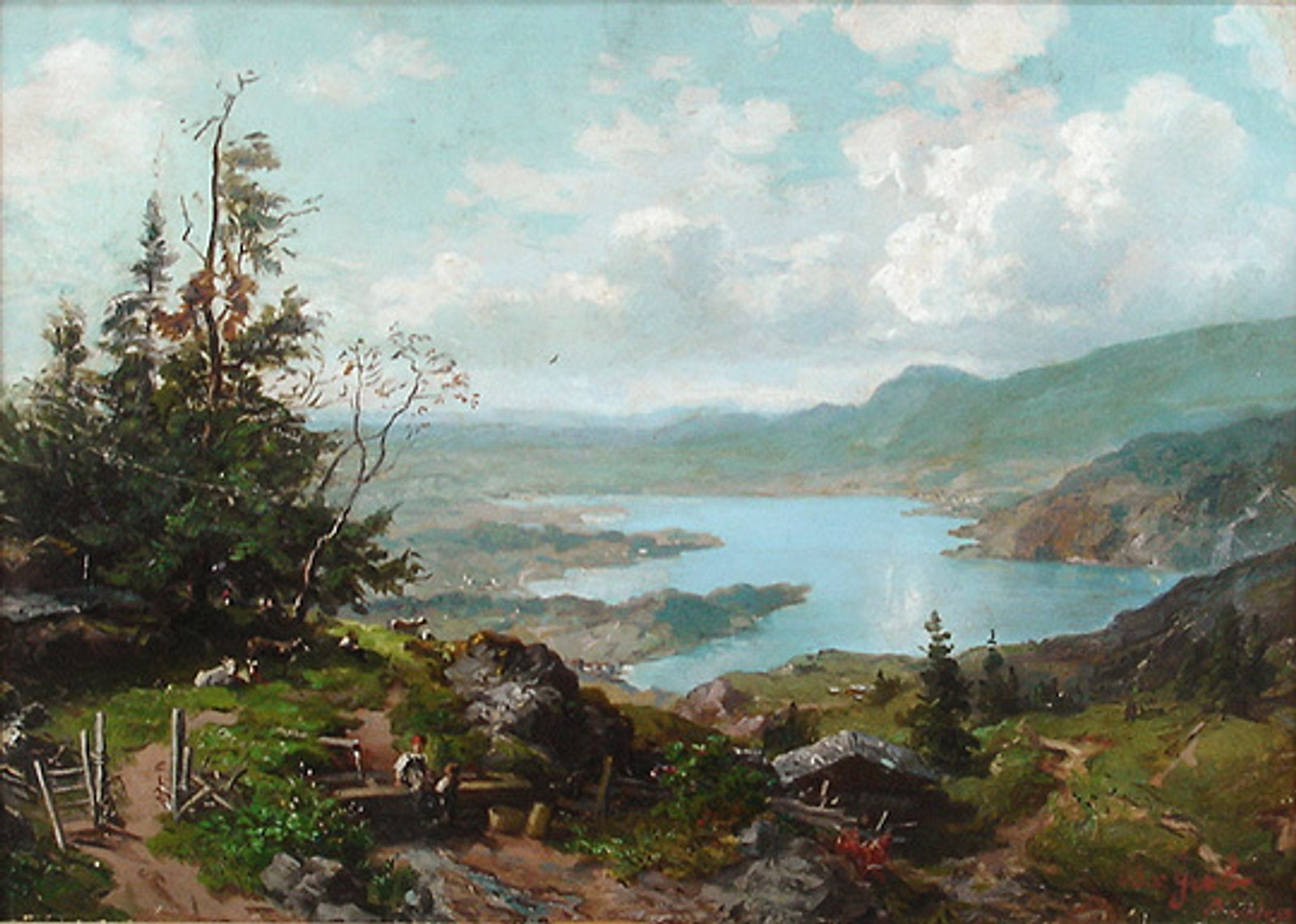
Lake Vista

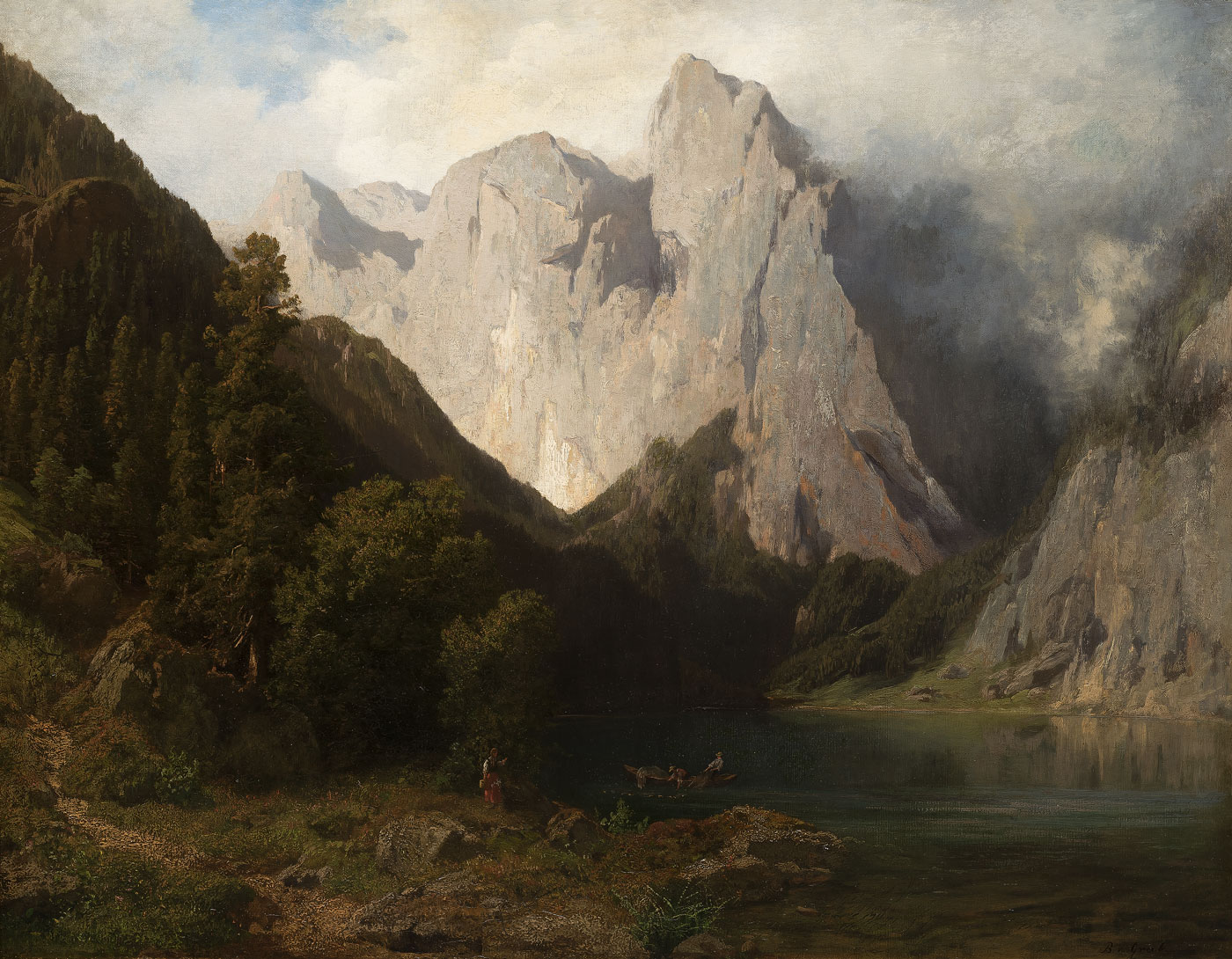
Fishermen on the Obersee

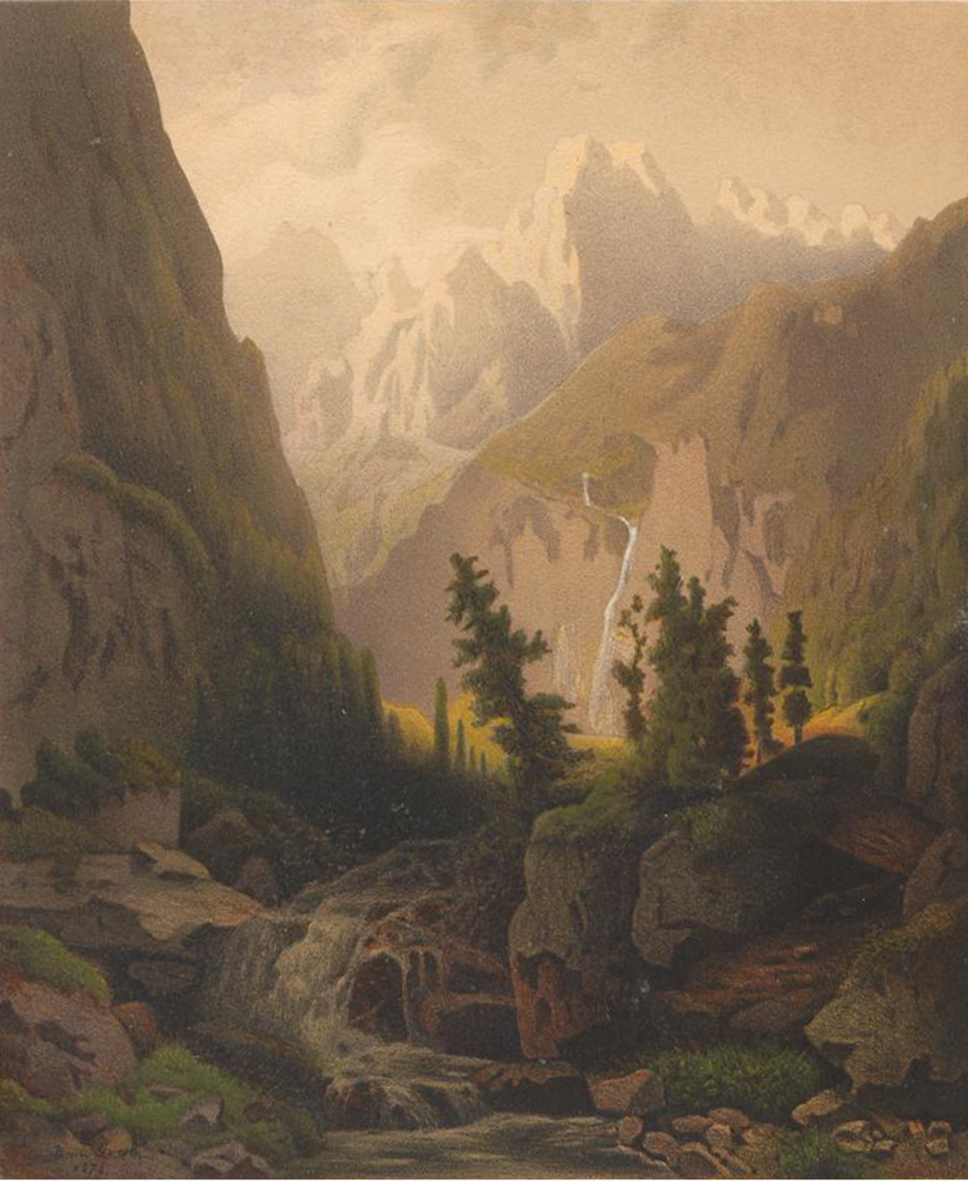
Gosau Gorge (On the Way to Lake Gosau)
