= Hugo Crola =

German painter (1841–1910)

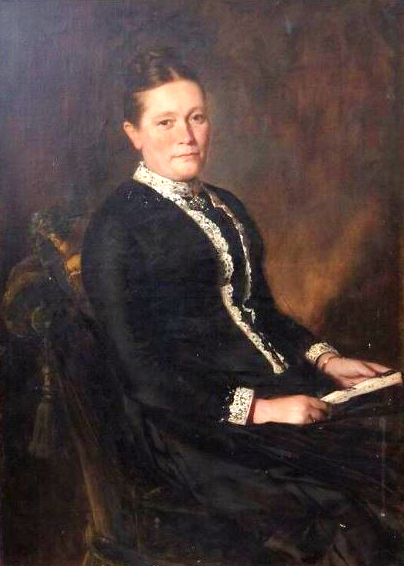
The artist's mother, Elisabeth née Fränkel

Hugo Crola (30 November 1841, Ilsenburg – 30 June 1910, Blankenburg) was a German portrait, landscape and genre painter, associated with the Düsseldorfer Malerschule.

== Life and work ==
He was the first of five children born to the landscape painting couple, Elise and Georg Heinrich Crola (originally Croll). In 1847, his parents bought what is now known as the "Crola-Haus", near Ilsenburg Castle, and that is where he grew up. Despite having so many children, they found time to travel together; visiting Switzerland, Italy, Norway, and several places in Germany.

He initially devoted himself to architecture; working with Friedrich Hitzig on the construction of the Berlin Stock Exchange. While there, he decided to switch to painting and attended classes at the Kunstakademie Berlin from 1861 to 1862. When the Exchange was completed, he enrolled at the Kunstakademie Düsseldorf, where he studied with Eduard Bendemann and Wilhelm Sohn. During a trip to Engelberg in 1865, Crola painted his first portrait: his father's.

An altarpiece, commissioned by the Courland Governorate, was his first major work. After winning a gold medal for a self-portrait at the 1873 Vienna World's Fair, he turned almost exclusively to portraits. Although he painted the likenesses of many aristocratic and wealthy public figures, he is best known for his portraits of his fellow artists. His style was originally based on the old Dutch Masters, but progressed to being more Impressionistic.

In 1877 he became a teacher there, in a class for drawing from living models. From 1878 to 1898, he was a professor of landscape painting. In 1880, when Hermann Wislicenus was dismissed as the academy's Director, he became part of a Board, where the title of Director alternated between him, Karl Woermann and Johann Peter Theodor Janssen. By the end of the century, he was one of the best known members of the Düsseldorfer Malerschule, and one of the academy's most active teachers.

== Notable students ==
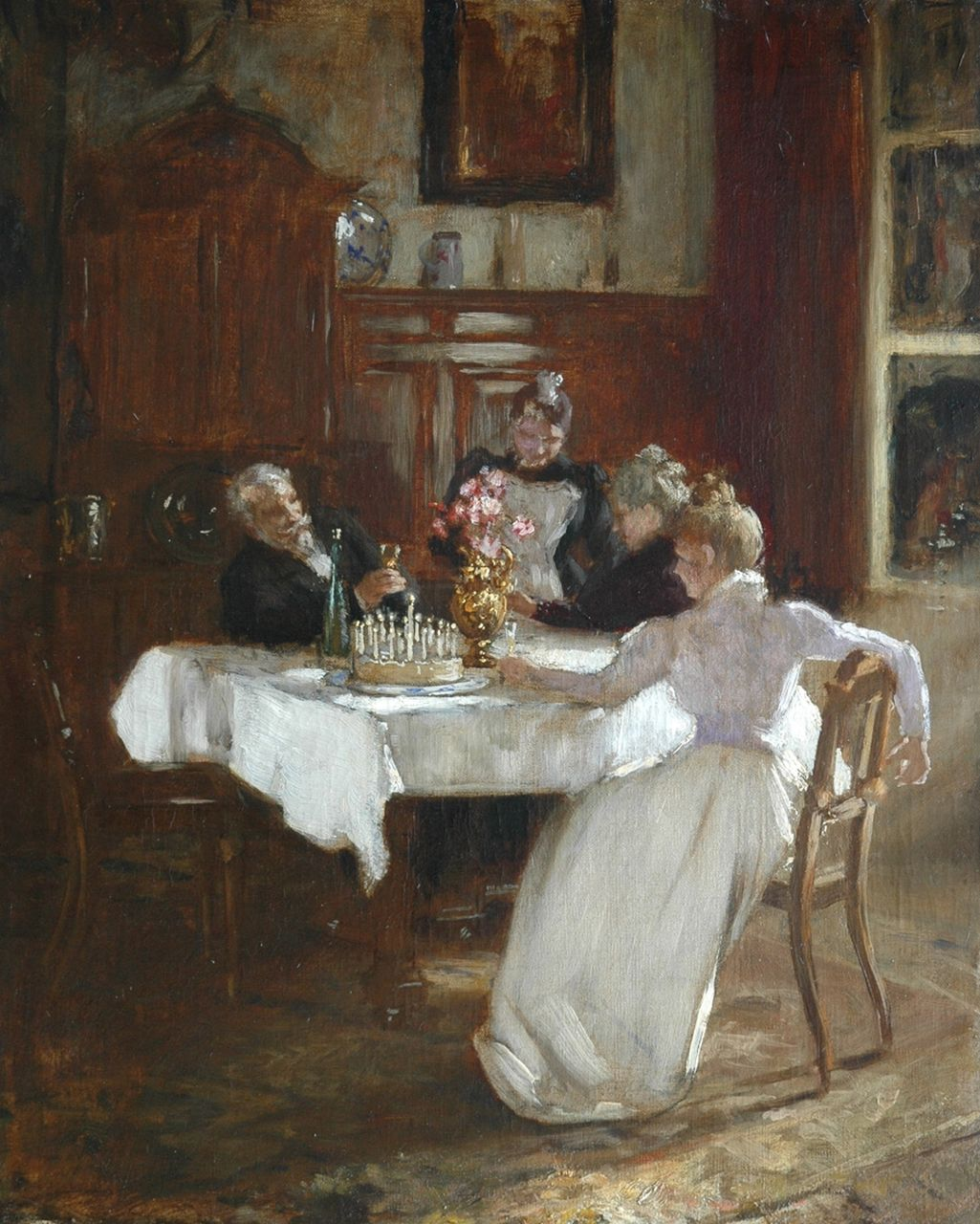
The Birthday Party

- Arthur Bambridge
- Georg Burmester
- Wilhelm Degode
- Oskar Freiwirth-Lützow
- Otto Heichert
- Lewis Edward Herzog
- Meinrad Iten
- Julian Klein von Diepold
- Ants Laikmaa
- Gari Melchers
- Peter Philippi
- Paul Raud
- Julius Rolshoven
- Wilhelm Schneider-Didam
- Friedrich Schwinge
- Alfred Sohn-Rethel
- Carl Strathmann
- Carl Vinnen
- Hans von Volkmann
- Robert Weise

== Sources ==
- Braunschweigisches Biographisches Lexikon, Vol.I, pg.128
- Crola. In: Meyers Großes Konversations-Lexikon. 6th edition. Vol. 4, Bibliographisches Institut, Leipzig/Vienna 1906, p. 350–351.
- Ekkehard Mai: Die deutschen Kunstakademien im 19. Jahrhundert: Künstlerausbildung zwischen Tradition und Avantgarde. Böhlau Verlag, Cologne, 2010, ISBN 978-3-412-20498-3, pg.204
- Zur Geschichte der düsseldorfer Kunst insbesondere im XIX. Jahrhundert. Kunstverein für die Rheinlande und Westfalen, 1902; "Hugo Crola", pp. 189, 293, 308, (Online)
