= Oskar Freiwirth-Lützow =

German painter (1862–1925)

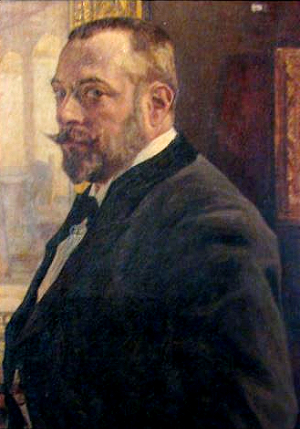
Self-portrait (before 1914)

Oskar Freiwirth-Lützow (12 May 1862, Moscow - 3 May 1925, Füssen) was a German painter who specialized in historical genre scenes.

== Biography ==
He was born to Wilhelm Lützow and his wife, Karolina née Kunkel. His father was an engineer from Potsdam who, at the time of his birth, was employed by the Moscow-Saint Petersburg State Railways. His mother was descended from a family of Swedish merchants who had emigrated to Russia. While still very young, his parents divorced and his mother remarried; to Oskar Freiwirth, Director of the Phoenix Works, a railway carriage company in Riga. He formally adopted Oskar, which gave him his hyphenated name.

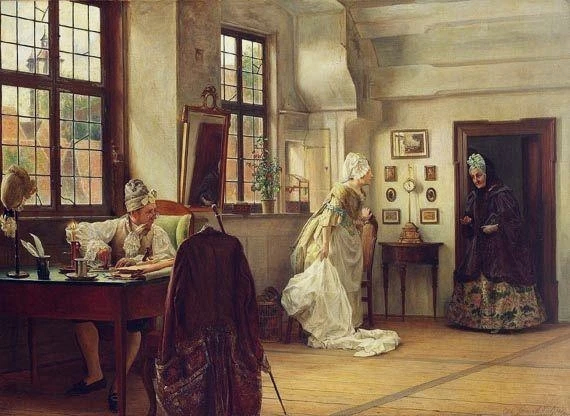
The Godmother

When the Phoenix Works went bankrupt, they moved to Stuttgart, his step-father's hometown. There he completed his secondary education and, following his parents' wishes, went to Bonn to study the natural sciences. He had already developed an interest in art, however, so he also took drawing lessons from the sculptor, Albert Küppers. After a time, he was able to convince his parents that his desire to be an artist was sincere, and he was allowed to enroll at the Kunstakademie Düsseldorf, where he studied with Hugo Crola until 1882.

This was followed by a stay in Geneva, working with Barthélemy Menn, and a similar stay in Rome with Giuseppe Ferrari. He also spent some time in Paris with Adolphe William Bouguereau and Tony Robert-Fleury, where he was influenced by the Barbizon School. Finally, he returned to Germany and worked with the genre artist, Toby Edward Rosenthal, in Munich.

He decided to establish himself there, with a small home and studio in Schwabing. In 1887, he went to Tiflis to marry Marie Radde (1868-1947); daughter of the geographer and naturalist, Gustav Radde. Their daughter, Tamara, was born in 1888. Shortly after, they went to live in Saint Petersburg, as the German art market had become flooded. By 1890, he had sold a painting to Grand Duke Alexander Mikhailovich. His studio flourished, and he was offered the post of President in the recently founded Saint Petersburg Society of Artists.

Despite these successes, he returned to Munich in 1899. There, he became a regular exhibitor at the Glaspalast, sat on the governing committee of the Munich Artists' Cooperative, and served as Treasurer for the General German Art Cooperative.

His painting style remained unaffected by contemporary art movements. This proved to be profitable. In 1912, a local art critic noted that his studio was empty because most of his works sold directly off the easel. He had numerous buyers in England and America, as well as Germany and Russia. In 1913, he moved to Bad Faulenbach, near Füssen, where he died in 1925.

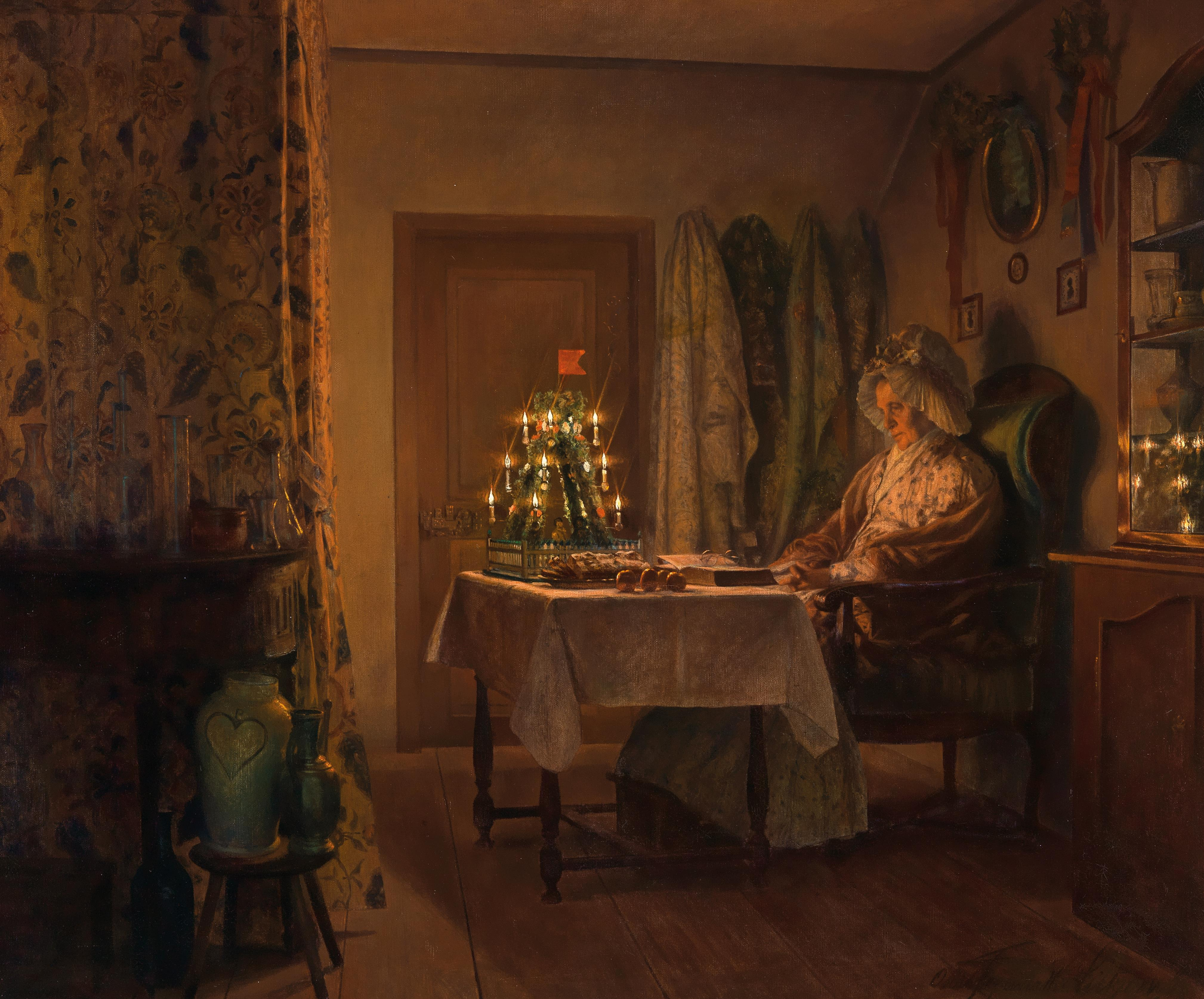
A Lonely Christmas
