= Otto Heichert =

German painter

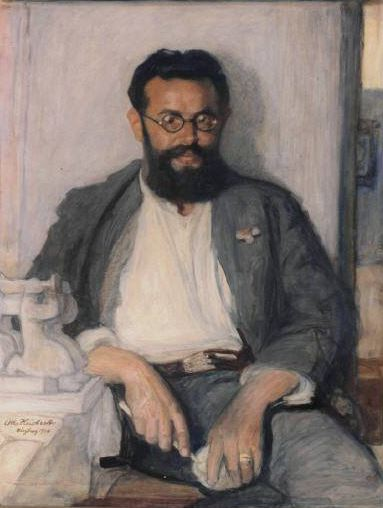
Self-portrait (1906)

Otto Theodor Rudolf Heichert (27 February 1868, in Gröningen Priory – 22 March 1946, in Oberschönau, near Berchtesgaden) was a German painter and graphic artist; associated with the Düsseldorfer Malerschule.

== Life and work ==
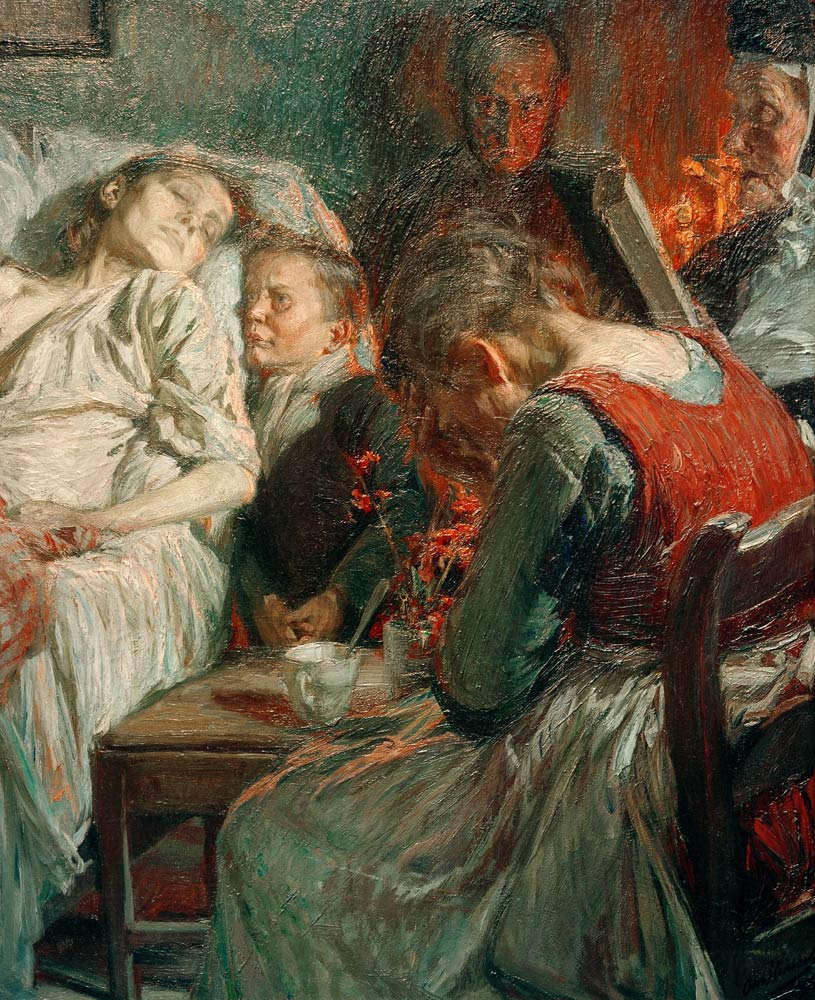
Mourners at the Deathbed

He was the first of four children born to Rudolf Wilhelm August Heichert, the caretaker of a monastery, and his wife, Marie Sophie née Hohmann. In 1872, after the death of their youngest child, his family moved to Magdeburg, where he spent his youth. As is the case with many artists, he displayed an early talent for drawing. At the age of fourteen, he was able to enroll at the Kunstakademie Düsseldorf, where he studied with Hugo Crola, Eduard von Gebhardt and Peter Janssen. Later, he became a master student of Wilhelm Sohn.

In 1894, he was at the Académie Julian in Paris. The following year, he was awarded a small gold medal at the Große Berliner Kunstausstellung. After making several study trips, and a brief stay in Bremen, he returned to Düsseldorf, where he lived until 1902. There, he became a member of the progressive artists' association "Malkasten" (Paintbox), and established himself as a portrait painter with an upper-class clientele.

At the age of thirty-four, he was appointed a Professor at the Königliche Akademie in Königsberg. During that time, he switched from portraits to genre scenes, some of which dealt with social issues. In 1909, he married Countess Margarete von Helldorf, which elevated him to the nobility. They had three children. In 1912, he received a commission to create a fresco for the auditorium of the Friedrichschule in Gumbinnen. It depicted King Frederick William I of Prussia in 1732, welcoming Protestant immigrants from Salzburg. Heichert placed a portrait of himself in the crowd.

During World War I, he was employed as a war artist. His works included a portrait of Paul von Hindenburg. He also created an historical scene, portraying the freedom fighter, Theodor Körner of the Lützow Free Corps, after the raid on Kitzen in 1813, where Körner was fatally wounded.

After the war, he lived in Berlin until 1923. He died shortly after World War II at his home in Oberschönau. His works may be seen at the Berliner Nationalgalerie, as well as at museums in Düsseldorf and Antwerp.

Under the Nazis, Heichert's Happy Family in Garden, was auctioned at a forced sale at Lempertz auctioneers. A settlement was reached following a claim for restitution by the Max and Iris Stern Foundation.

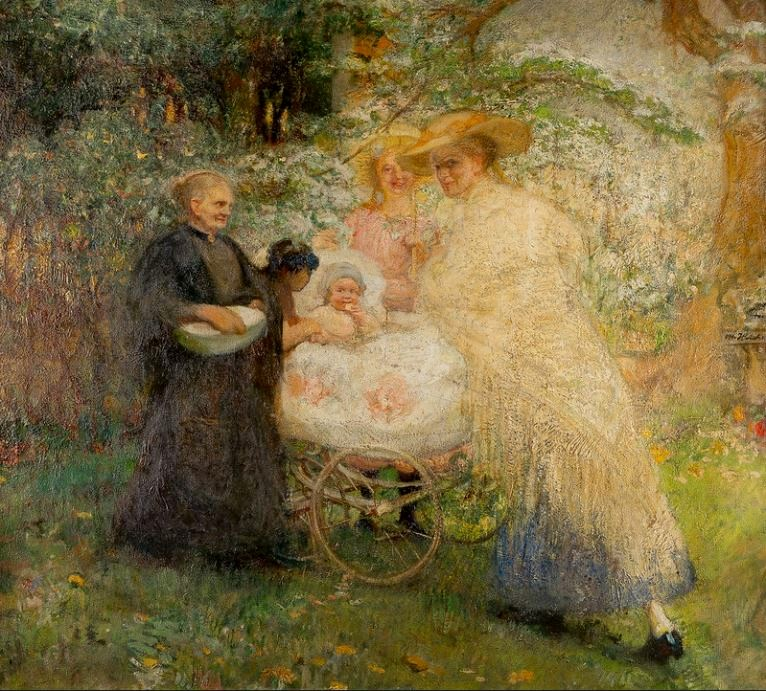
A Happy Family in the Garden
