= John Robinson Tait =

American painter

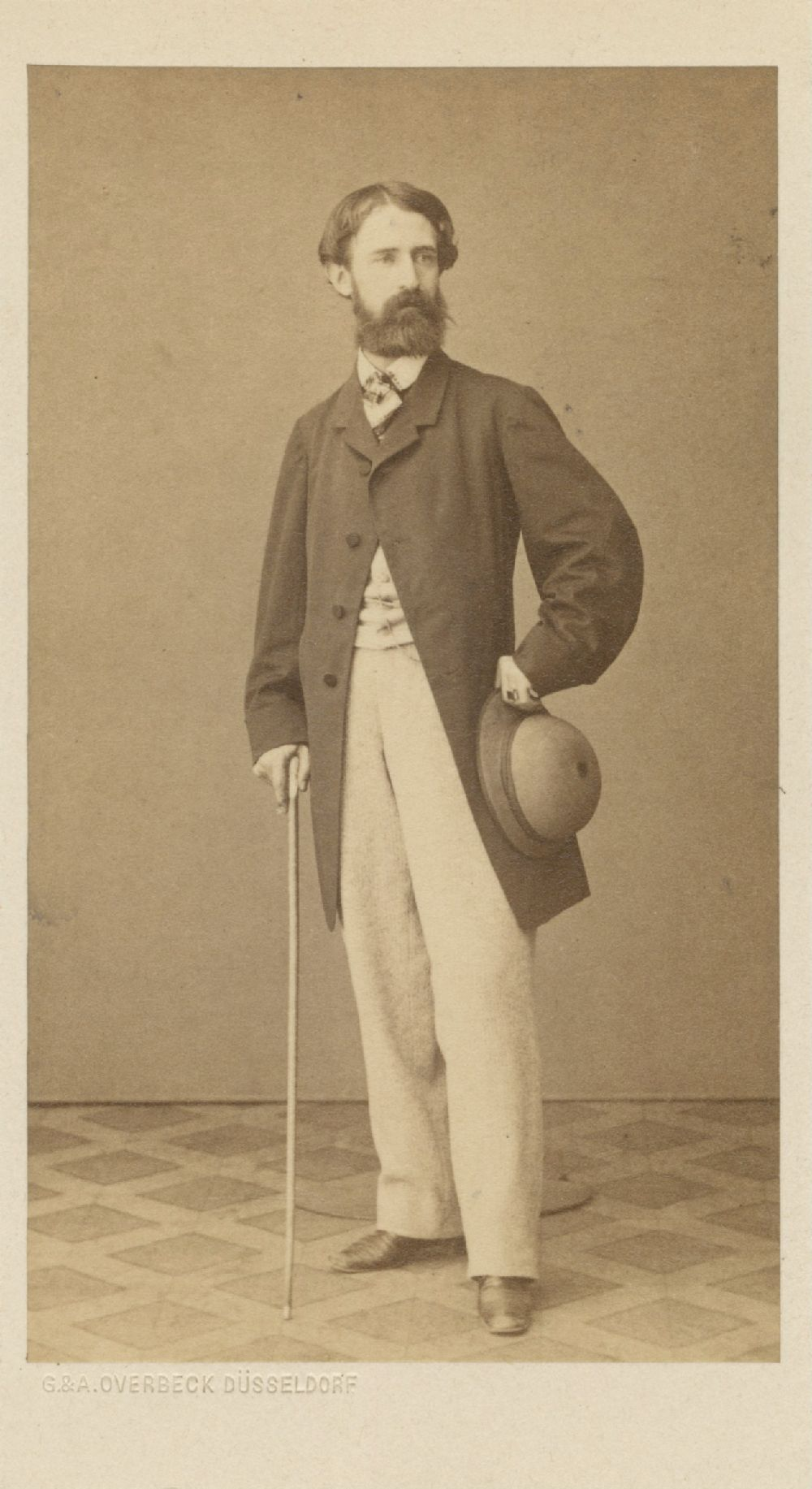
- John Robinson Tait by G. & A. Overbeck (firm)
- Born: January 13, 1834; Cincinnati, Ohio
- Died: July 29, 1909 (aged 75); Baltimore, Maryland
- Education: Bethany College
- Notable work: Dolce Far Niente; European Life, Legend, and Landscape; Reminiscences of a Poet-Painter
- Movement: Düsseldorfer Malerschule and the Munich School
- Spouse: Anna D. Tiernan (m. 1872)

John Robinson Tait (January 14, 1834 – July 29, 1909) was an American landscape painter, art critic, and travel writer. He spent many years in Germany, where he was associated with the Düsseldorfer Malerschule and the Munich School.

== Biography ==
John Robinson Tait was born in Cincinnati on January 14, 1834. He received his higher education at Bethany College, where he published a student magazine called The Stylus. In 1853, he made his first trip to Europe (primarily Italy) in the company of his teacher, William Louis Sonntag. He paid a short visit to Düsseldorf to see an old acquaintance, Worthington Whittredge. During his stay, he met Emmanuel Leutze and his student, fellow American William Washington, who encouraged Tait to study there.

In 1855, he returned to the United States in the company of his childhood friend, Thomas Buchanan Read, whom he had met in Florence. Four years later, he wrote a book describing his experiences and, that same year, returned to Düsseldorf, where he remained until 1870 as a student of August Weber and Andreas Achenbach.

He married Anna D. Tiernan in 1872.

He worked with Rudolf Wiegmann at the Kunstakademie Düsseldorf and, between 1873 and 1876, took further lessons with Adolf Heinrich Lier in Munich.

He took two trips to the United States during this time, in 1866 and the early 1870s, where he exhibited at the "Cincinnati Industrial Exposition" of 1871 and was awarded first prize. He eventually settled in Baltimore and wrote art criticism for the New York Evening Mail. Most of his extant paintings are in Europe.

He died at his home in Baltimore on July 29, 1909.

== Selected paintings ==
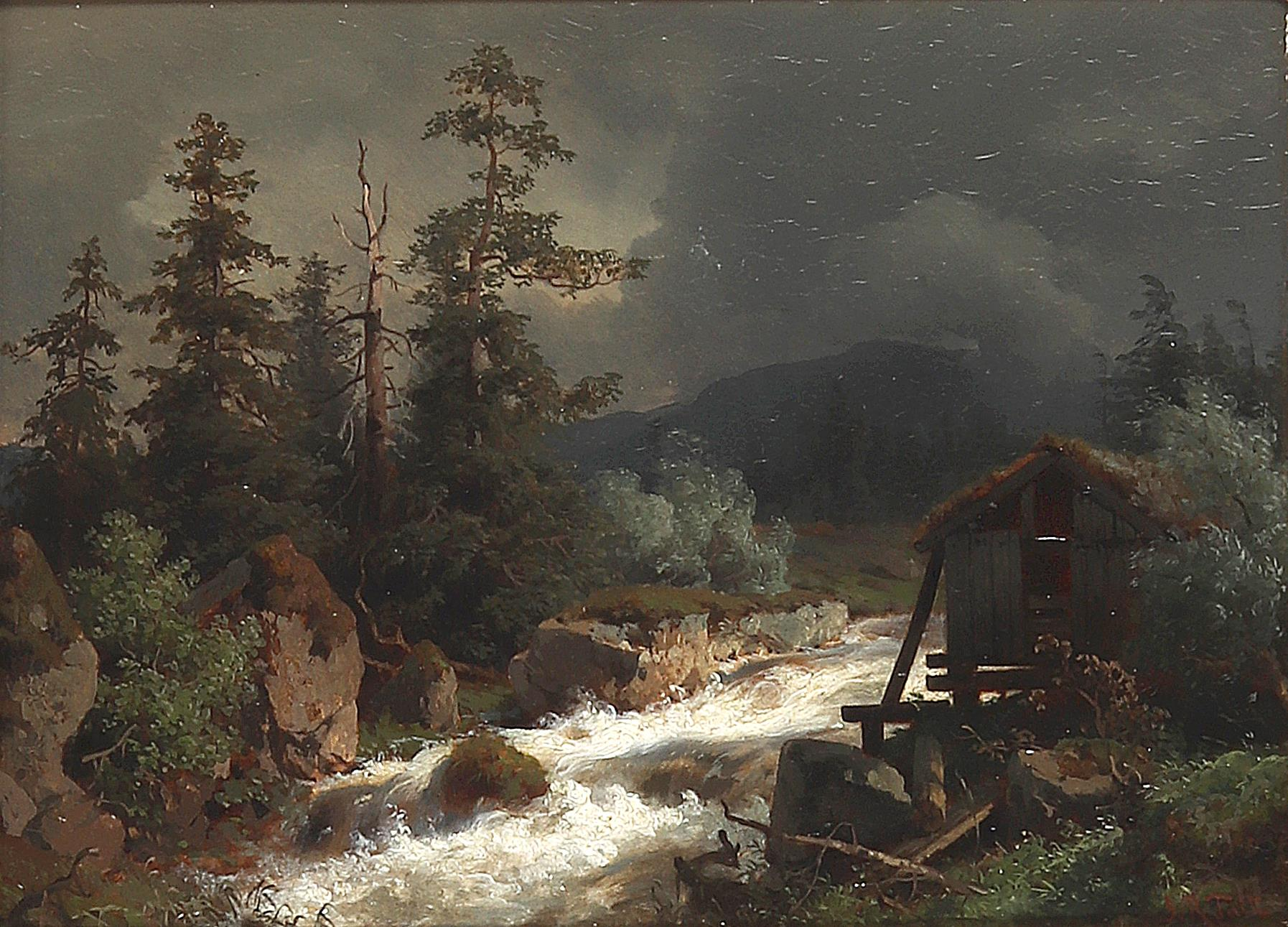
Torrent (date unknown)

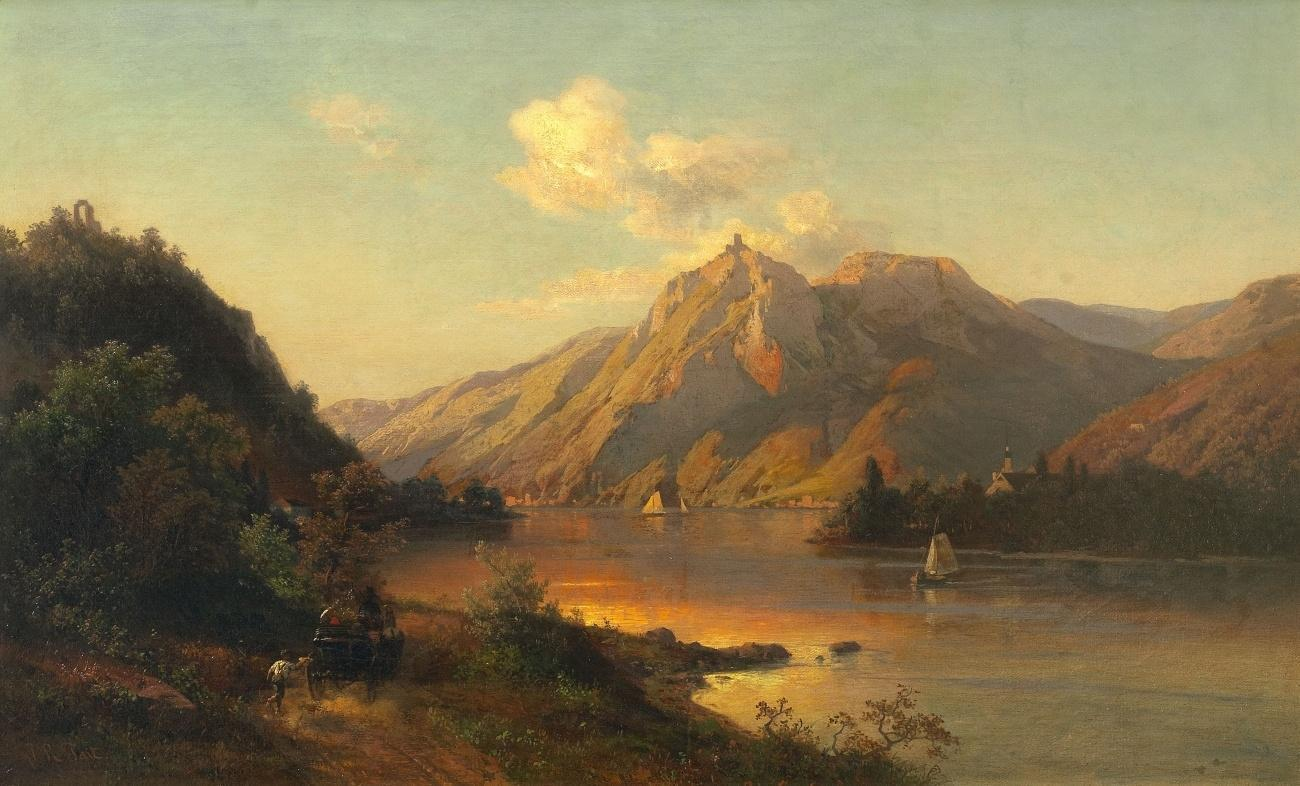
Nonnewerth at the Drachenfels (1866)

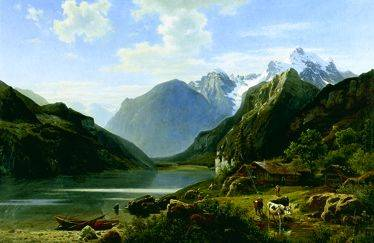
Evening at the Lake Shore (1876)

== Writings ==
- Dolce Far Niente, Parry and McMillan, Philadelphia 1859 (Poetry, Online)
- European Life, Legend, and Landscape, James Challen & Son, Philadelphia 1859 (Online)
- Reminiscences of a Poet-Painter. In: Lippincott's Magazine of Popular Literature and Science, XIX, 17, March 1877, pg.307 ff. (Memories of his friend, Thomas Read, Online)
