= August Weber =

German painter (1817–1873)

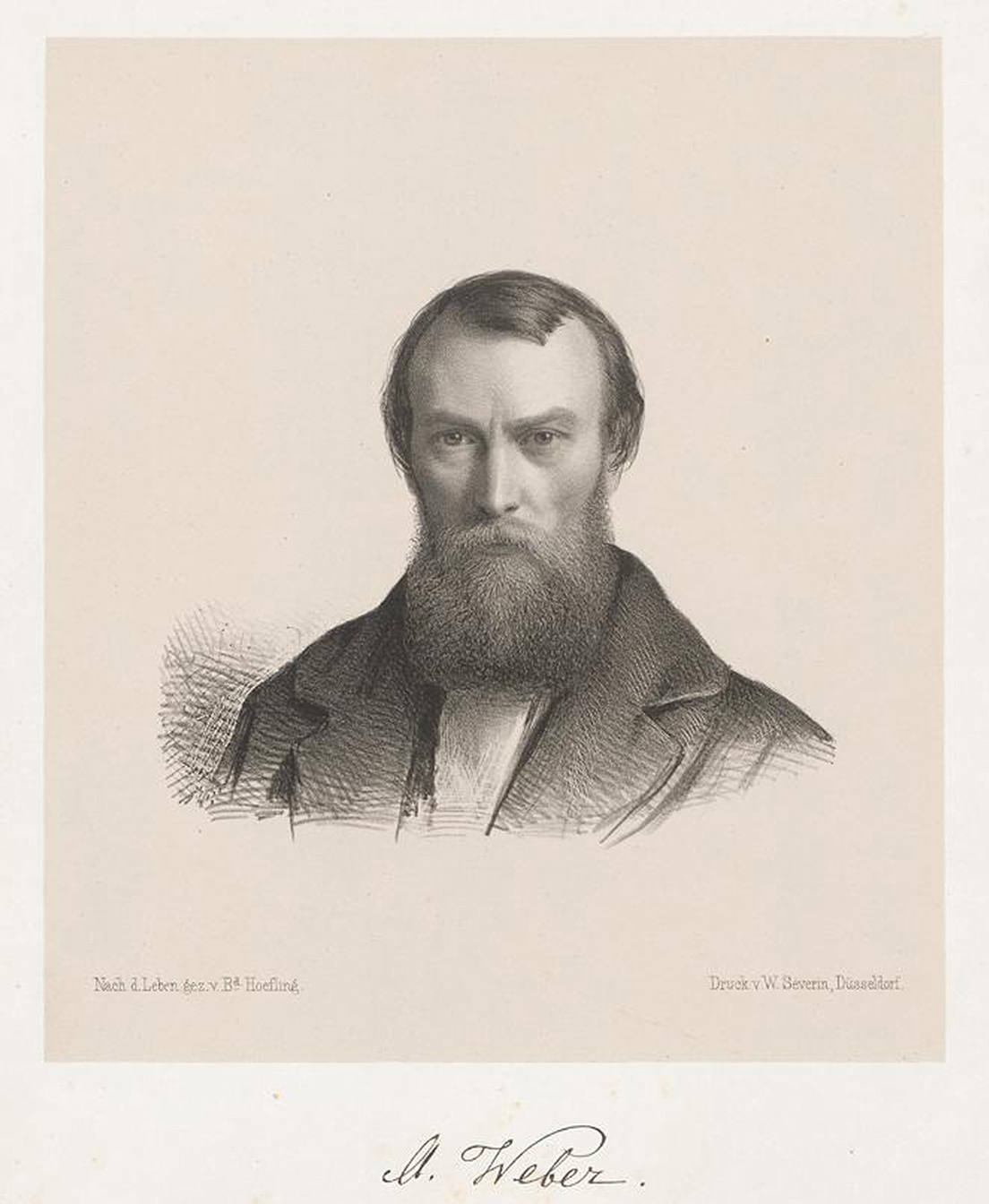
August Weber in 1853; by Bernhard Höfling (1817–1871)

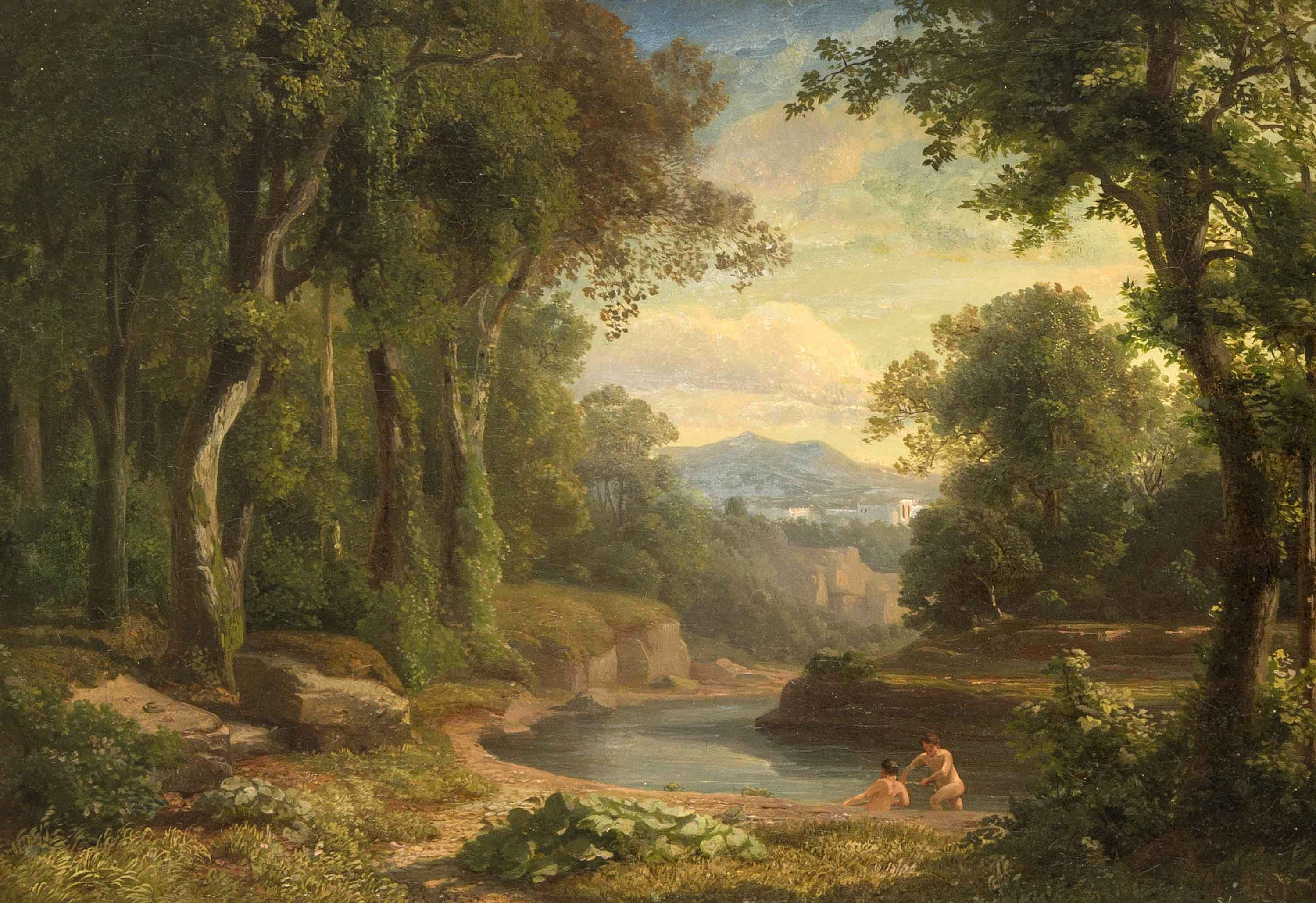
Forested River Landscape

Johann Baptist Wilhelm August Weber (10 January 1817 – 11 September 1873) was a German painter; associated with the Düsseldorfer Malerschule.

== Life and work ==
He was born in Frankfurt am Main. He began studying landscape painting in his hometown, with Carl Heinrich Rosenkranz (1801–1851), then moved to Darmstadt in 1835, where he continued his studies with the court painter, Johann Heinrich Schilbach. This was followed by a study trip to Switzerland.

Upon returning to Frankfurt, he studied at the Städelschule until 1838. In that year, he went to Düsseldorf, where he spent a year at the KunstAkademie, and soon became a teacher himself. His notable students included Theodor Martens, Otto Odebrecht and John Robinson Tait. Due to his proven ability, he was appointed a Professor by King Friedrich Wilhelm III.

In 1844, he was one of the co-founders of the Verein der Düsseldorfer Künstler, and later became a member of the progressive artists' association "Malkasten" (Paintbox). In 1863, he was named an honorary member of the Düsseldorfer Künstler-Liedertafel (Round Table) and, the following year, he became an Honorary Master of the Freies Deutsches Hochstift in Frankfurt. In 1871, he developed an eye condition that left him unable to paint for over a year. In 1873, shortly after he had resumed painting, he died of pneumonia in Düsseldorf.

Although his works are realistic in appearance, most of them are composed of imaginative or idealistic elements. The art historian Walter Cohen described his work as expressing a "Post-Romantic" sensibility, inspired by Salomon van Ruysdael. In addition to landscape paintings, he also created watercolors and lithographs.

A large number of his works were damaged or destroyed during World War II. Many of the paintings subsequently sold as his were actually the work of a Swiss artist, also named August Weber, who lived from 1898 to 1957.

== Sources ==
- Hermann Arthur Lier (1896). "Weber, August" . Allgemeine Deutsche Biographie (in German). Vol. 41. Leipzig: Duncker & Humblot. p. 282.
- "Weber, August". In: Friedrich von Boetticher: Malerwerke des 19. Jahrhunderts. Beitrag zur Kunstgeschichte, Vol.2/2, Saal–Zwengauer, Boetticher's Verlag, Dresden 1901, pg.979 (Online)
- "Weber, August", In: Richard Klapheck: Die Kunstsammlungen der Staatlichen Kunstakademie zu Düsseldorf. Strucken, Düsseldorf 1928
- "Weber, August", In: Allgemeines Lexikon der Bildenden Künstler von der Antike bis zur Gegenwart, Vol. 35: Waage–Wilhelmson, pp. 215–216, E. A. Seemann, Leipzig, 1942
