= August Leu =

German painter

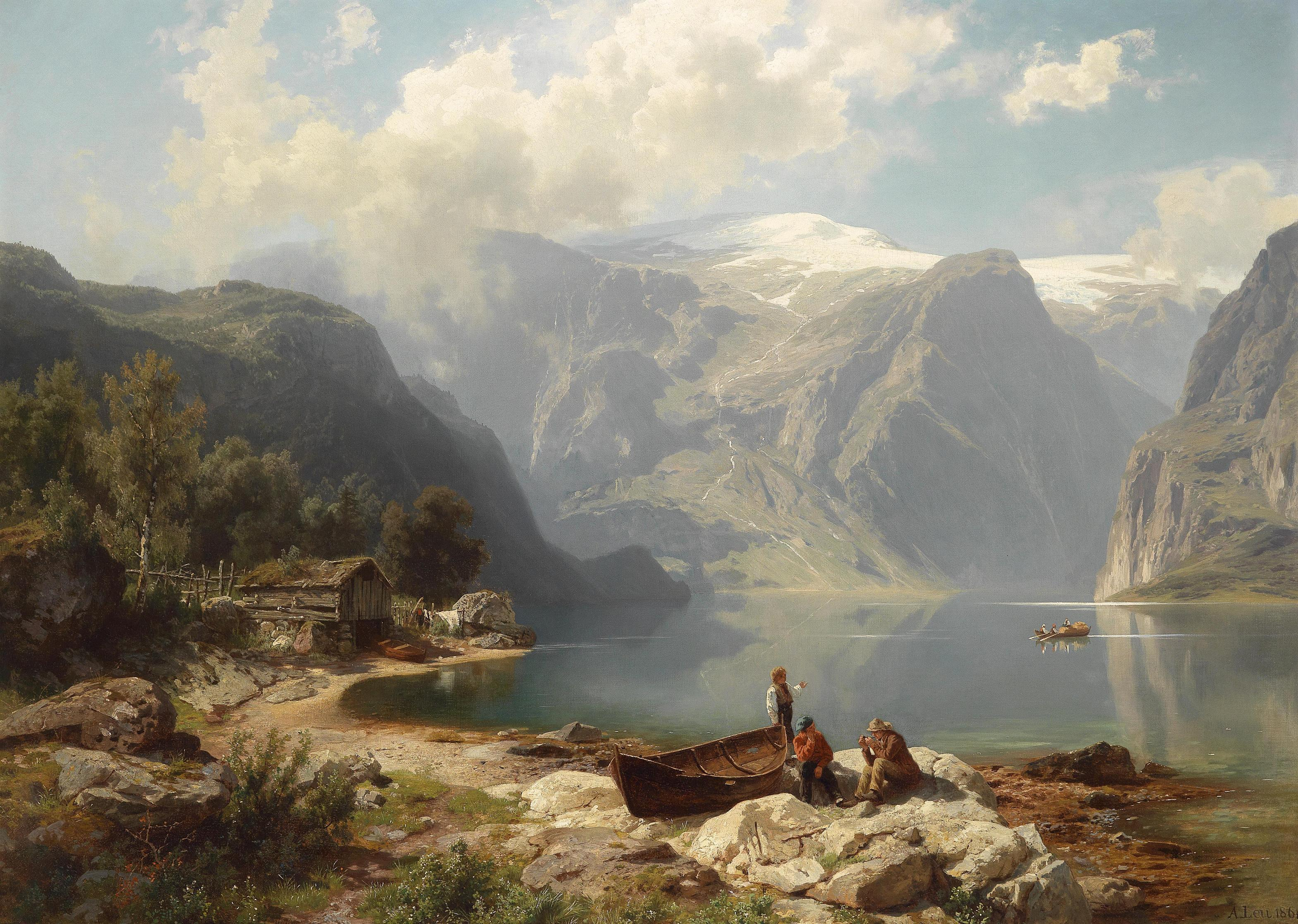
A Sunny day on a Norwegian Fjord by August Leu (1862)

August Wilhelm Leu (24 March 1818 – 20 July 1897) was a German landscape painter of the Romantic school. Most of his pictures are large-format and depict scenes in Norway and the Alps.

== Biography ==
Leu was born in Münster. He was a pupil of Johann Wilhelm Schirmer, a landscape painter of the Düsseldorf school.

Leu travelled in Norway in 1843 and 1847, and later travelled widely in the Alps. His Norwegian paintings raised awareness in Germany of that country's scenery. He lived for a time in Brussels, then returned to Düsseldorf; in 1855 he received an honourable mention at the Paris Exposition. In 1882 he moved to Berlin, where he became a royal professor and a member of the Academy of Art; he was also a member of the Vienna, Amsterdam and Brussels Academies. He received several gold medals in Berlin and was awarded the Belgian Order of Leopold.

His son, also named August Leu (1852–76) studied under him and was a landscape and animal painter. Leu died in Seelisberg, Switzerland.

== Selected works ==
- Hardangerfjord im Sonnenlicht (1849), Kunstverein Bremen (1849), now Private Collection in Norway
- Norwegian Landscape with Waterfall (1849)
- Sognefjord (1849)
- Hohe Göll at Berchtesgaden (1859)
- Oeschinen Lake (1876)
- Queen Joanne's Palace at Naples (1886)
- Pool at Blankenburg in the Harz Mountains (1888)
- On the Engstlenalp (1893)
- Königsee and Watzmann
- Norwegian High Plateau
- Sunset on the Coast at Sorrento
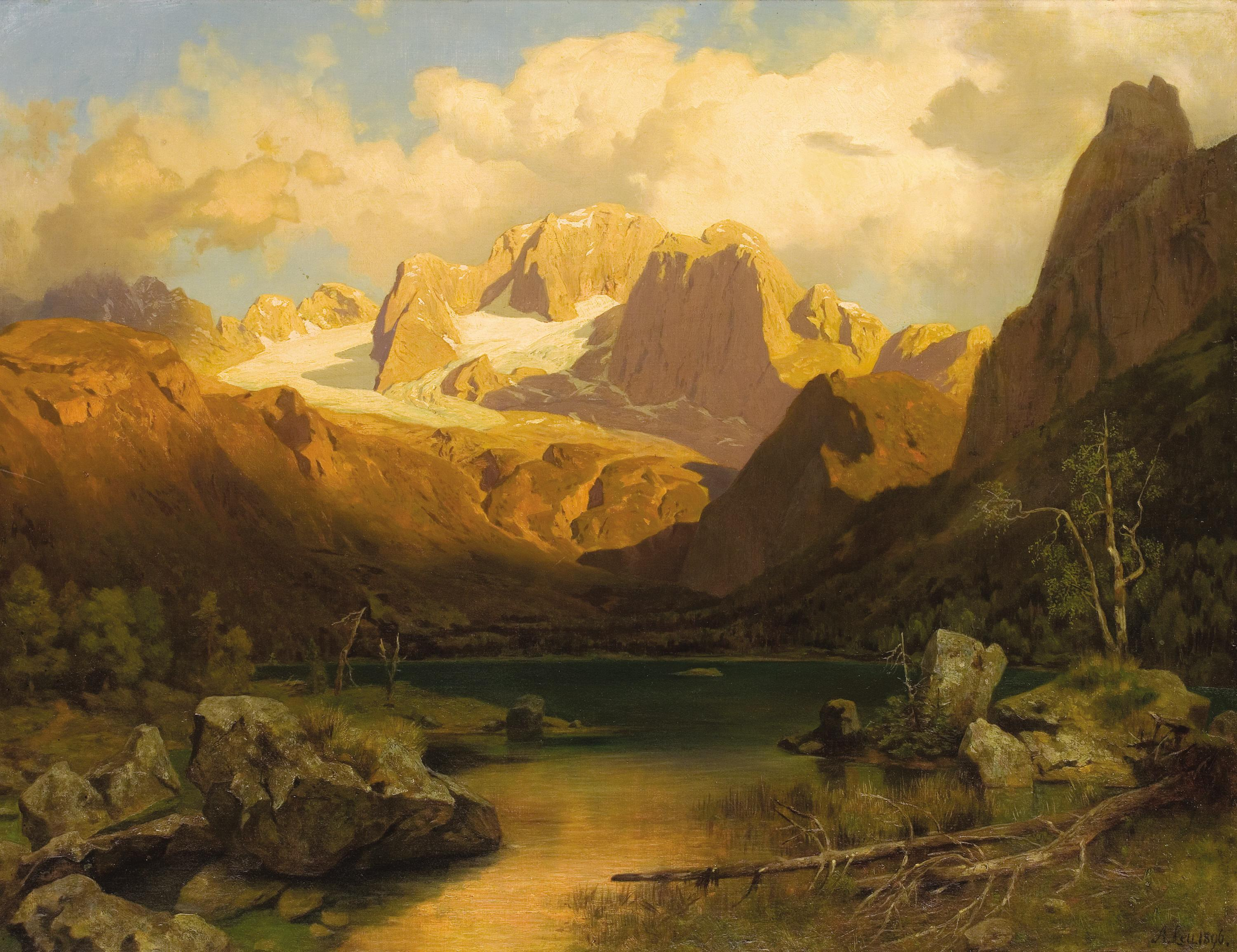
Alpine Peak (1896)

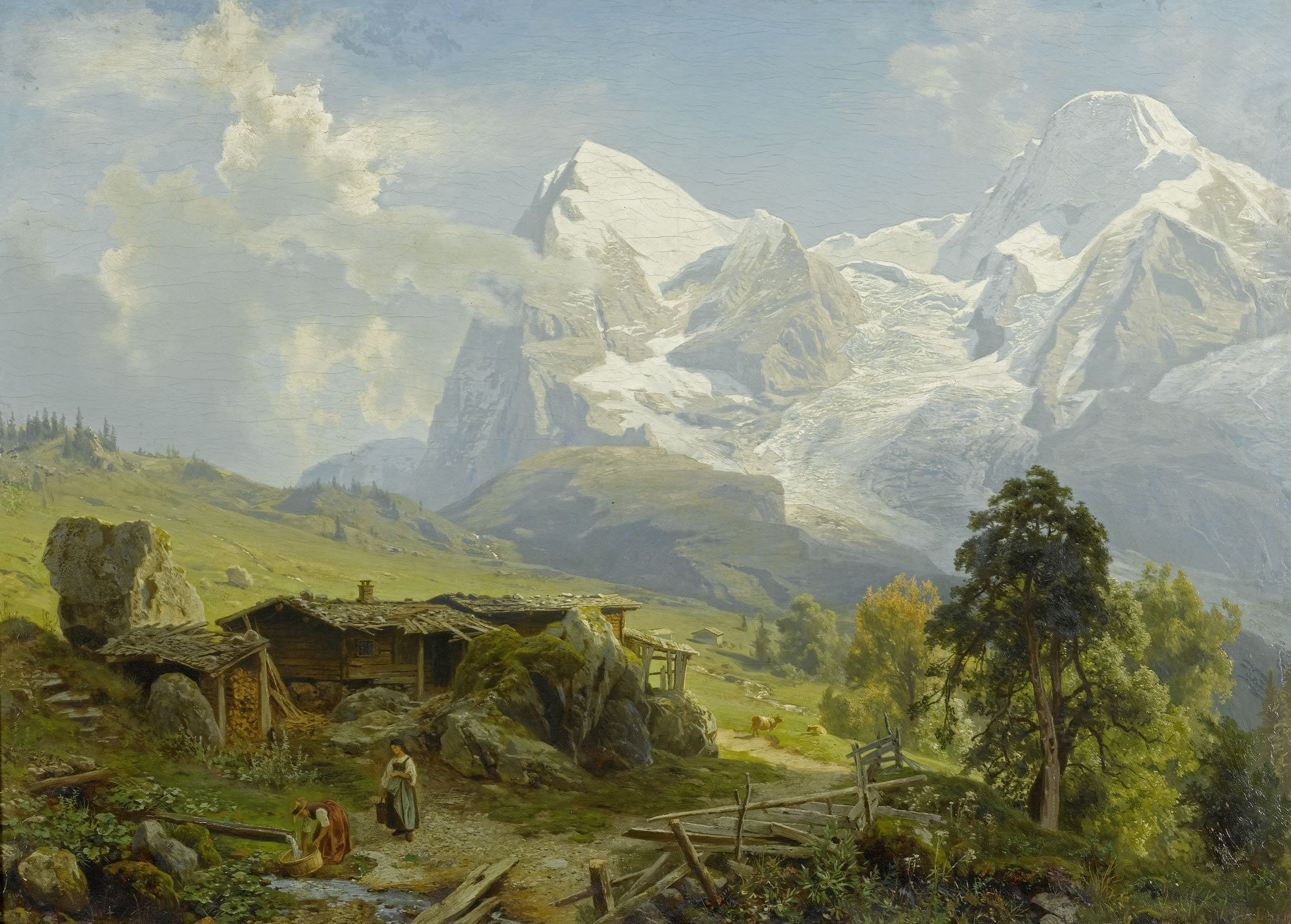
View of the Eiger and the Mönch from the Wengerenalp (1865)

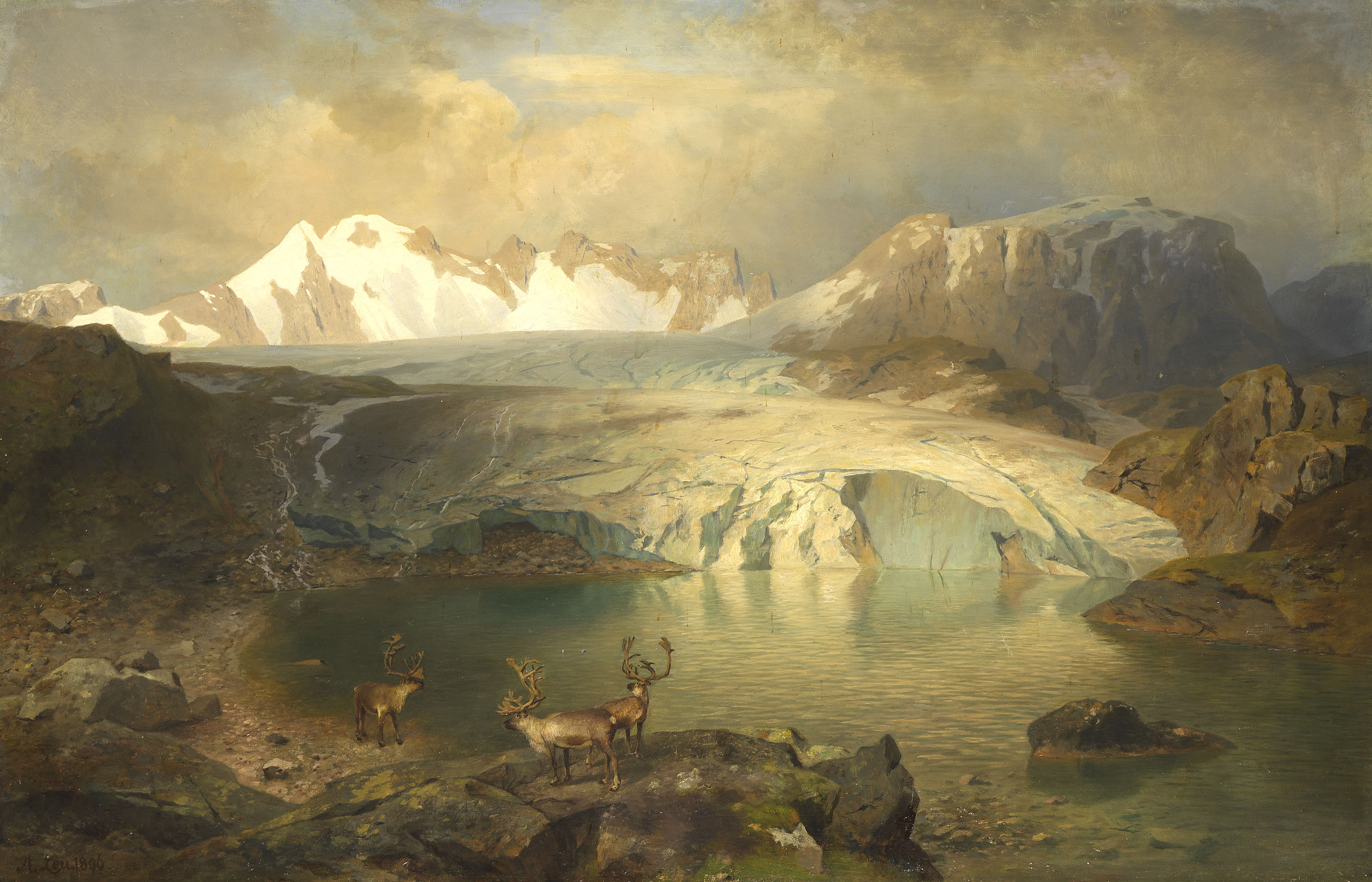
Fjord Landscape with Glacier and Reindeer (1896)

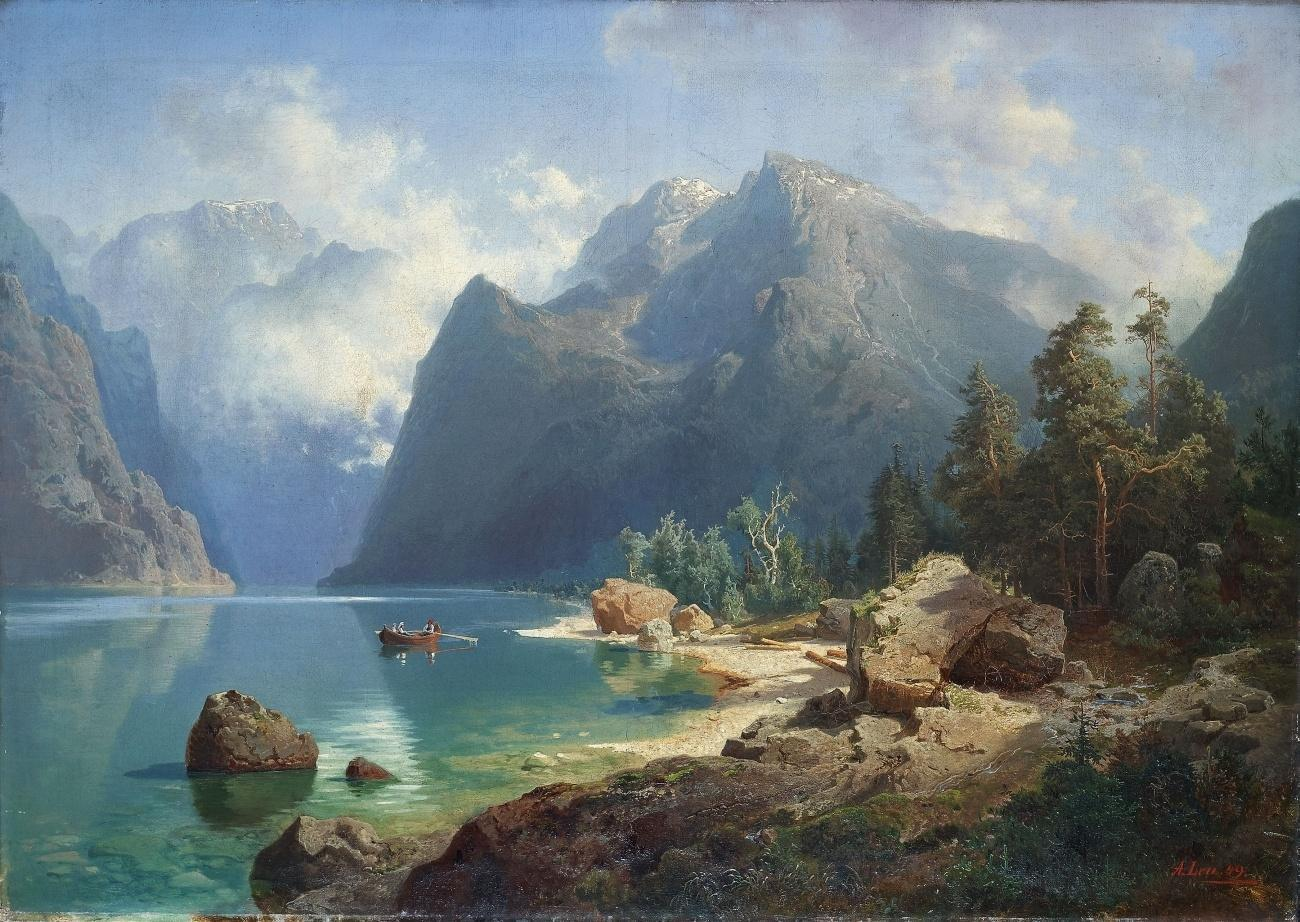
Norwegian Fjord Landscape (1849)

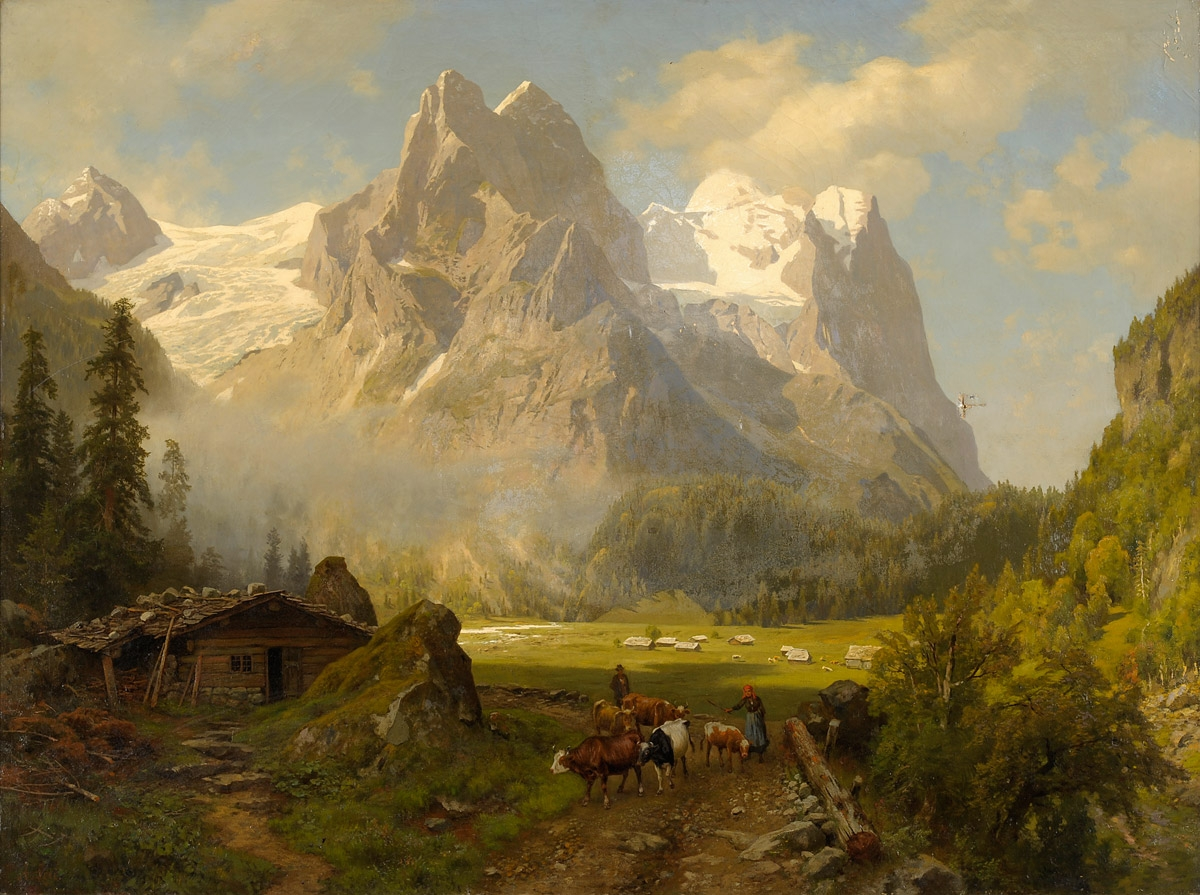
Matterhorn
