= Johann Wilhelm Schirmer =

German painter (1807–1863)

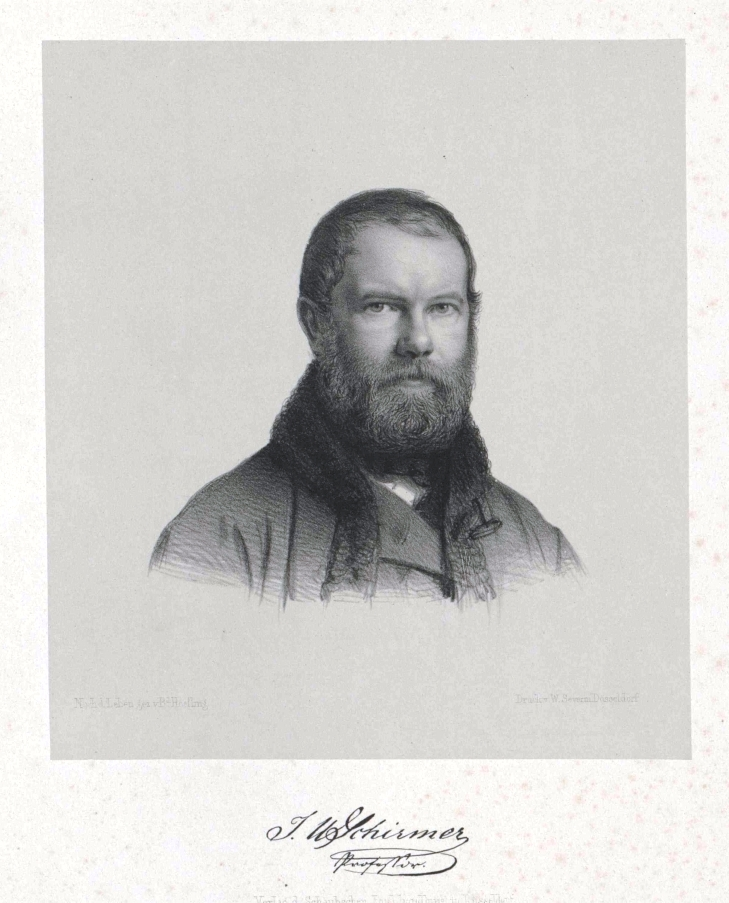
Johann Wilhelm Schirmer (1853)

Johann Wilhelm Schirmer (5 September 1807 – 11 September 1863) was a German landscape artist, born in Jülich, within the Prussian Duchy of Jülich.

== Biography ==
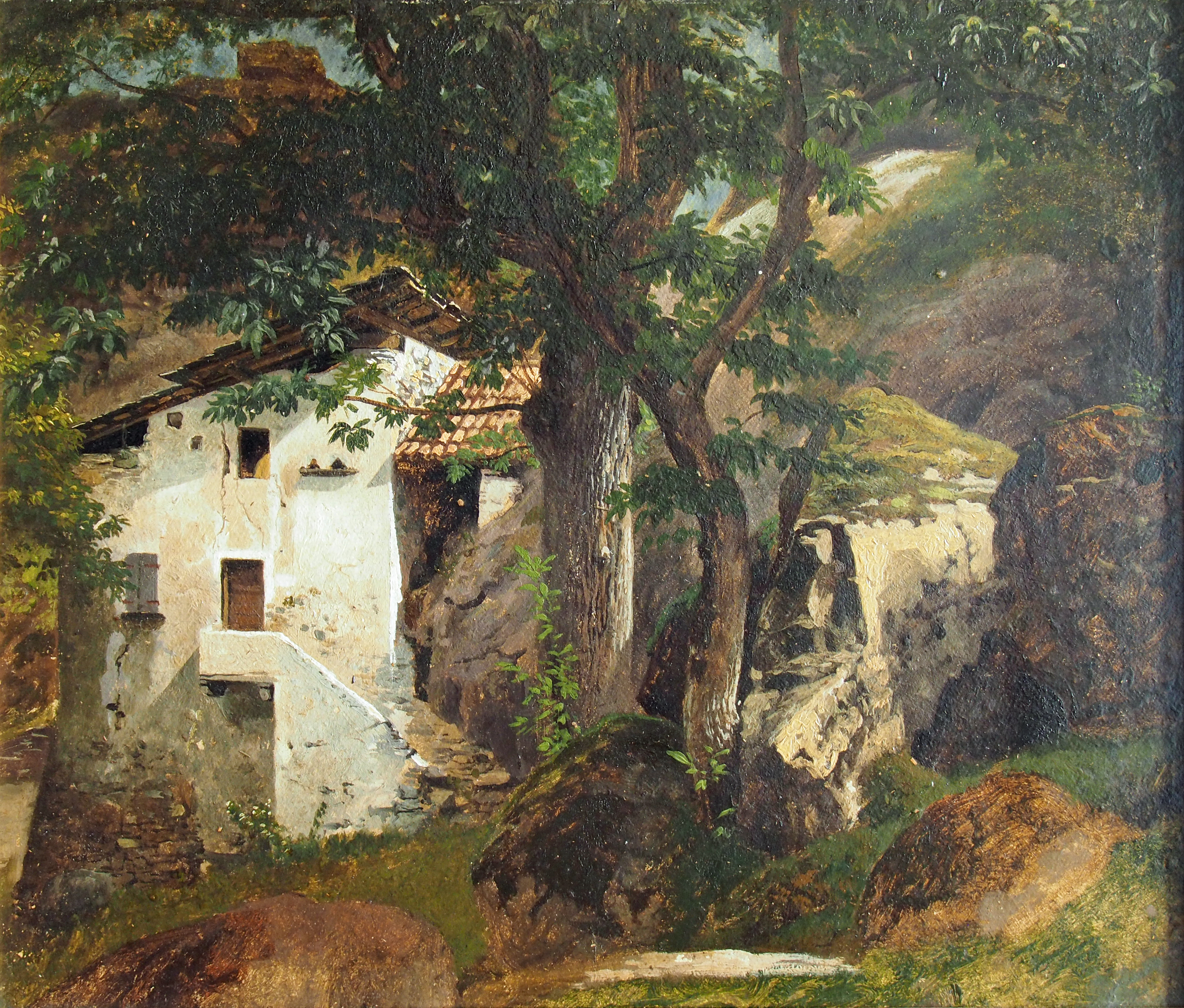
South Tyrolean house beneath chestnut trees, ca.1839–1840

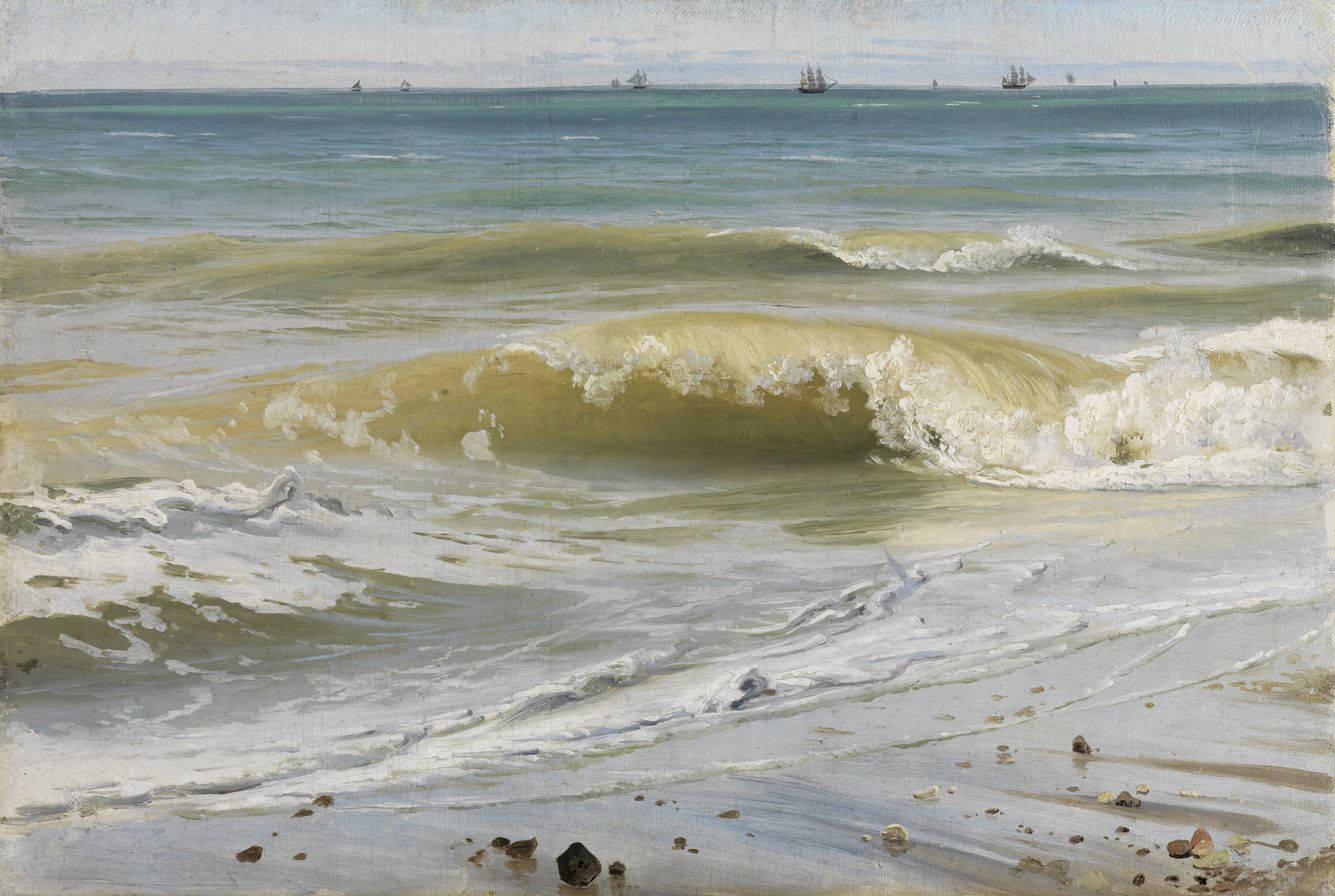
Breaking Waves with Distant Ships

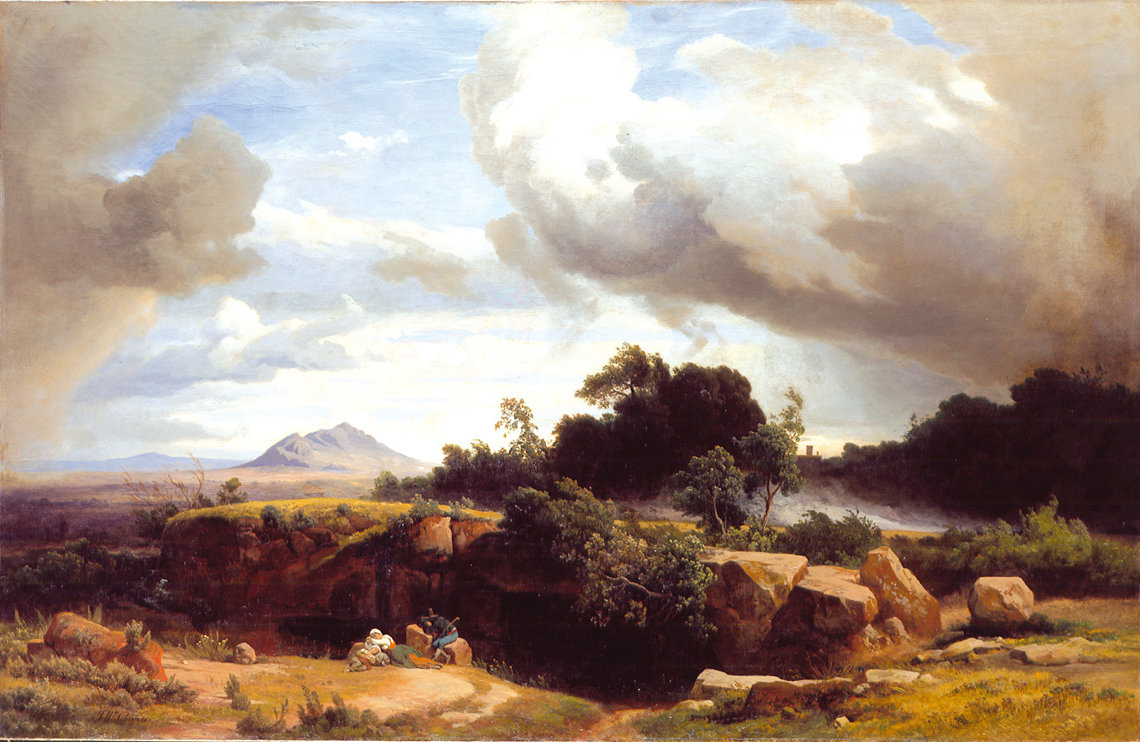
Heranziehendes Gewitter

Schirmer started as a student of historical painting under Schadow at the academy of Düsseldorf. Later, he came under the influence of Carl Friedrich Lessing and landscape painting and began painting historical landscapes in the manner of Nicolas Poussin. He became known as one of the first of the Düsseldorf school of painting.

In 1830, he became an assistant professor, and later, in 1839, a professor at the Düsseldorf Academy. In the meantime, he visited and painted in Belgium, the Black Forest, Switzerland, the Netherlands, Normandy and Italy. In 1854, he took up the role of a director at the art school at Karlsruhe, where he died.

This artist is sometimes confused with August Wilhelm Ferdinand Schirmer, who had similar interests and belonged to the same era. In addition, both were known by the name Wilhelm Schirmer, and were students of Wilhelm von Schadow, although at different academic institutions.

== Characteristic works ==
Schirmer created romantic, classical and Biblical landscapes, such as:

- The Grotto of Egeria (1842), in the Leipzig Museum
- Twelve Scenes from the History of Abraham (1859–62), in the National Gallery at Berlin
- An Italian Park at Berlin
- Nether German landscape at Leipzig
- A series of 26 Biblical landscapes at the Düsseldorf gallery
- Good Samaritan (1857), four landscapes at Karlsruhe
