= Berkemeier =

Berkemeier is a surname. Notable people with the surname include:

- Ludolph Berkemeier (1864–1930), Dutch painter
- Winfried Berkemeier (born 1953), German footballer
