= Füchsel =

Füchsel or Fuechsel is a German surname derived from the nickname which is a diminutive of Fuchs, 'fox', for a cunning or a red-haired person. Notable people with the surname include:

- Georg Christian Füchsel (1722–1773), German physician and geologist
- George Fuechsel, an IBM programmer credited with the introduction of the term garbage in, garbage out (GIGO)
- Hermann Fuechsel, German-American landscape painter and member of the Hudson River School
