= Düsseldorf School of painting =

19th-century German school of painting

The Düsseldorf School of painting is a term referring to a group of painters who taught or studied at the Düsseldorf Academy (now the Staatliche Kunstakademie Düsseldorf or Düsseldorf State Art Academy) roughly between 1819 and 1918, first directed by the painter Wilhelm von Schadow.

== About ==
The work of the Düsseldorf School is characterized by finely detailed yet fanciful landscapes, often with religious or allegorical stories set in the landscapes. Major members of the Düsseldorf School advocated "plein air painting", and tended to use a palette with relatively subdued and even colors. The Düsseldorf School derived from and was a part of the German Romantic movement. Prominent members of the Düsselorf School included von Schadow, Karl Friedrich Lessing, Johann Wilhelm Schirmer, Andreas Achenbach, Hans Fredrik Gude, Adolph Tidemand, Oswald Achenbach, and Adolf Schrödter.

The Düsseldorf School had a significant influence on the Hudson River School in the United States, and many prominent Americans trained at the Düsseldorf Academy and show the influence of the Düsseldorf School, including George Caleb Bingham, David Edward Cronin, Eastman Johnson, Worthington Whittredge, Richard Caton Woodville, William Stanley Haseltine, James McDougal Hart, Helen Searle, and William Morris Hunt, as well as German émigré Emanuel Leutze. Albert Bierstadt applied but was not accepted. His American friend Worthington Whittredge became his teacher while attending Düsseldorf.

== Notable artists ==
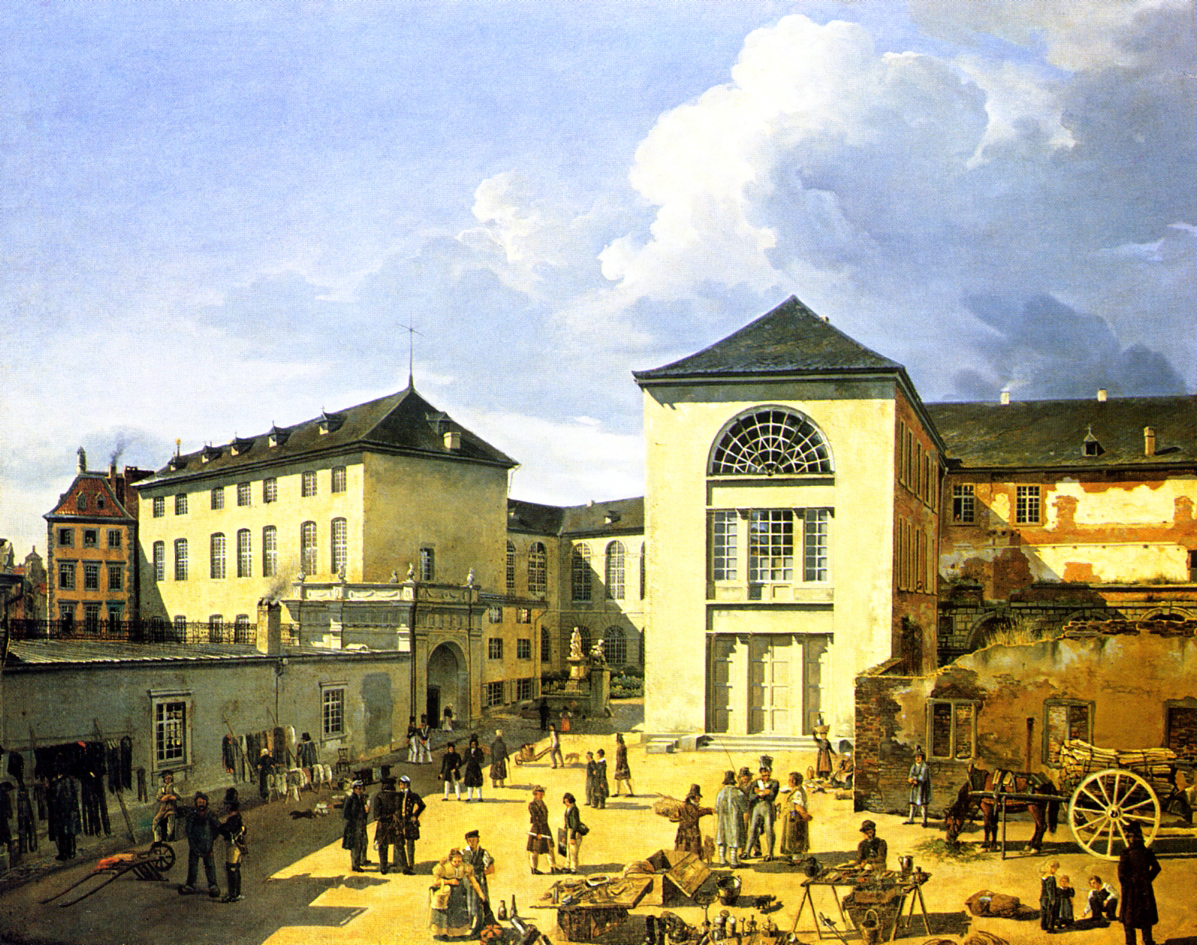
The old "Academie of Düsseldorf", Andreas Achenbach, 1831

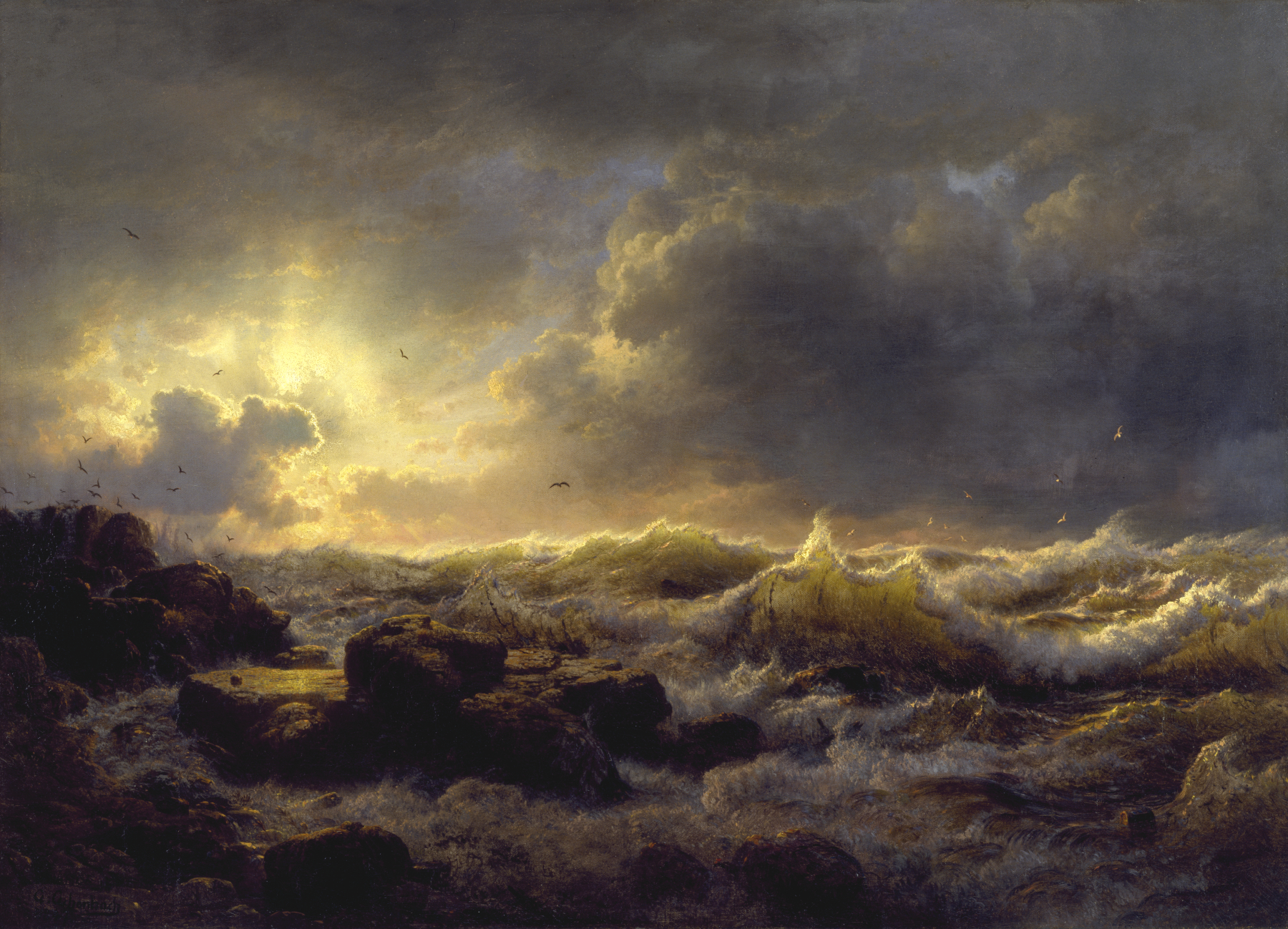
Clearing Up—Coast of Sicily, Andreas Achenbach, 1847, The Walters Art Museum

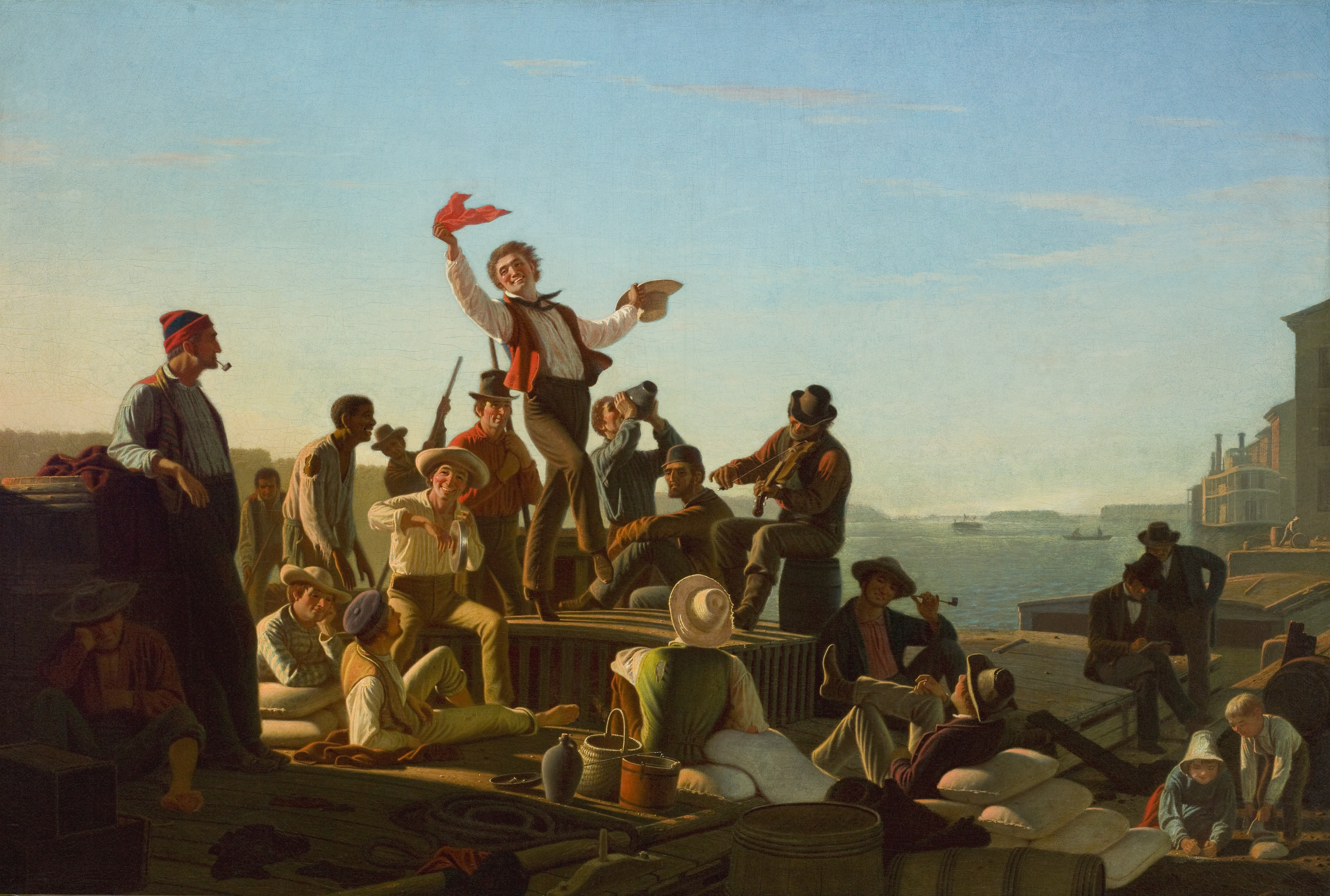
Jolly Flatboatmen in Port, George Caleb Bingham, 1857

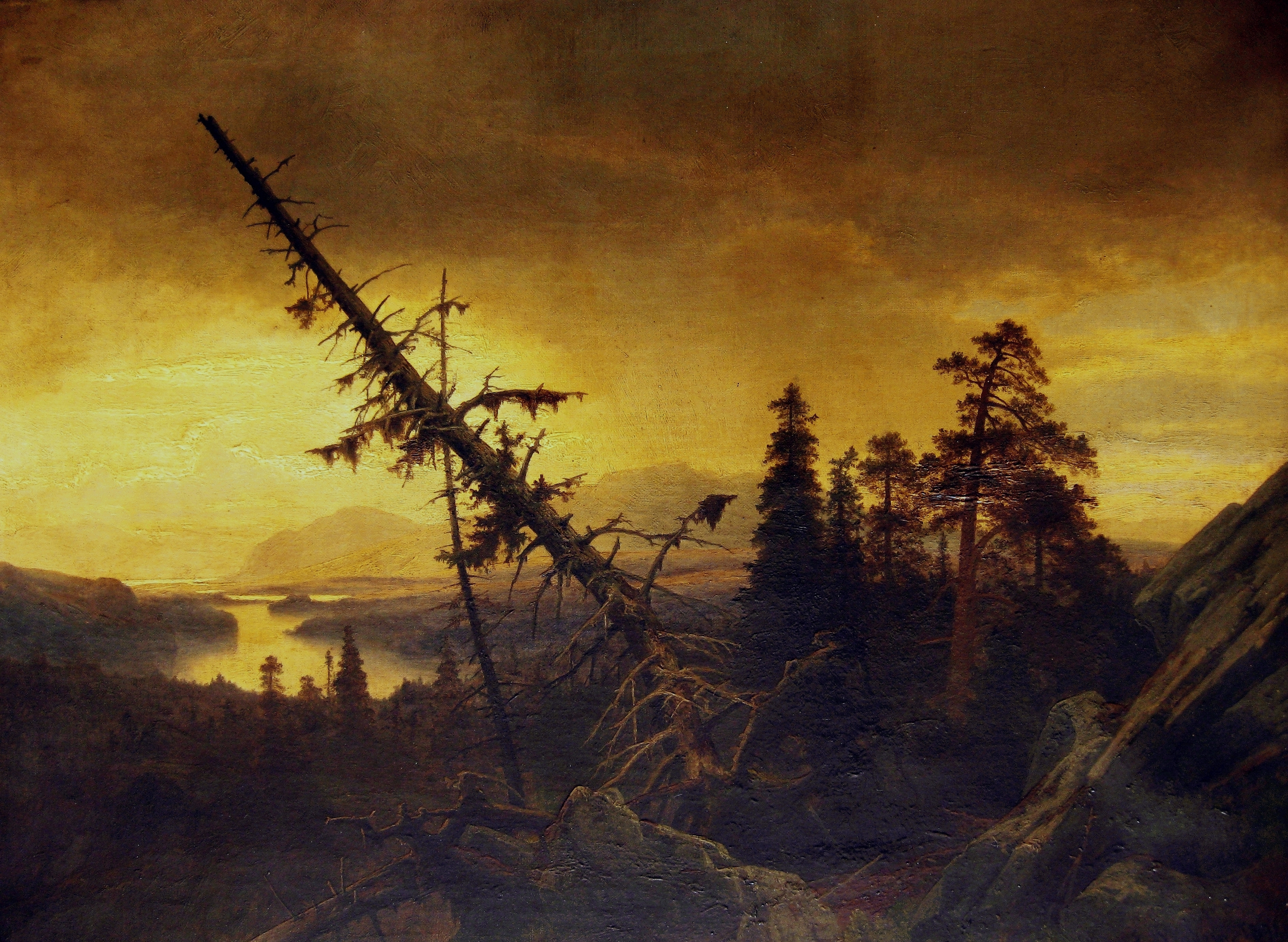
Tranquillity after the Storm, Erik Bodom, 1871

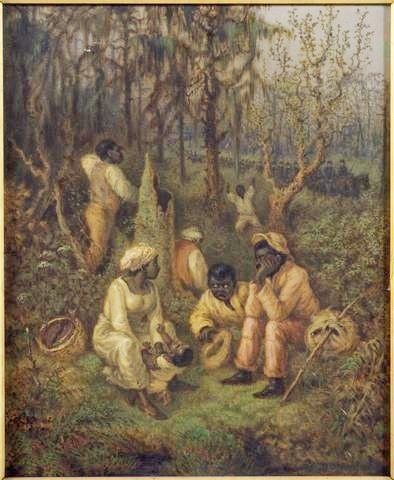
Fugitive Slaves in the Dismal Swamp, Virginia, David Edward Cronin, 1888

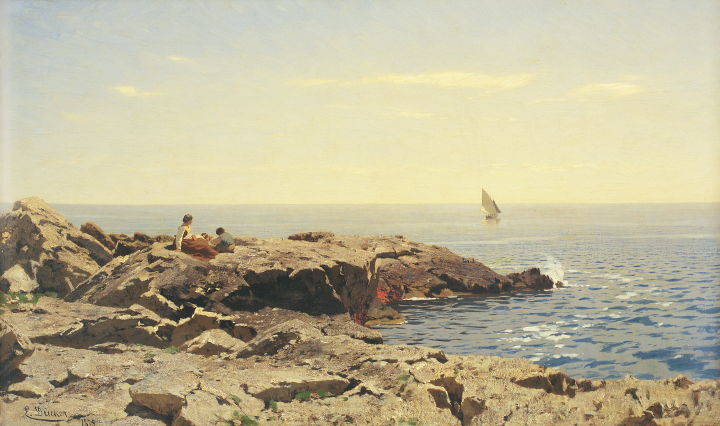
On the Seashore, Eugen Dücker, 1875

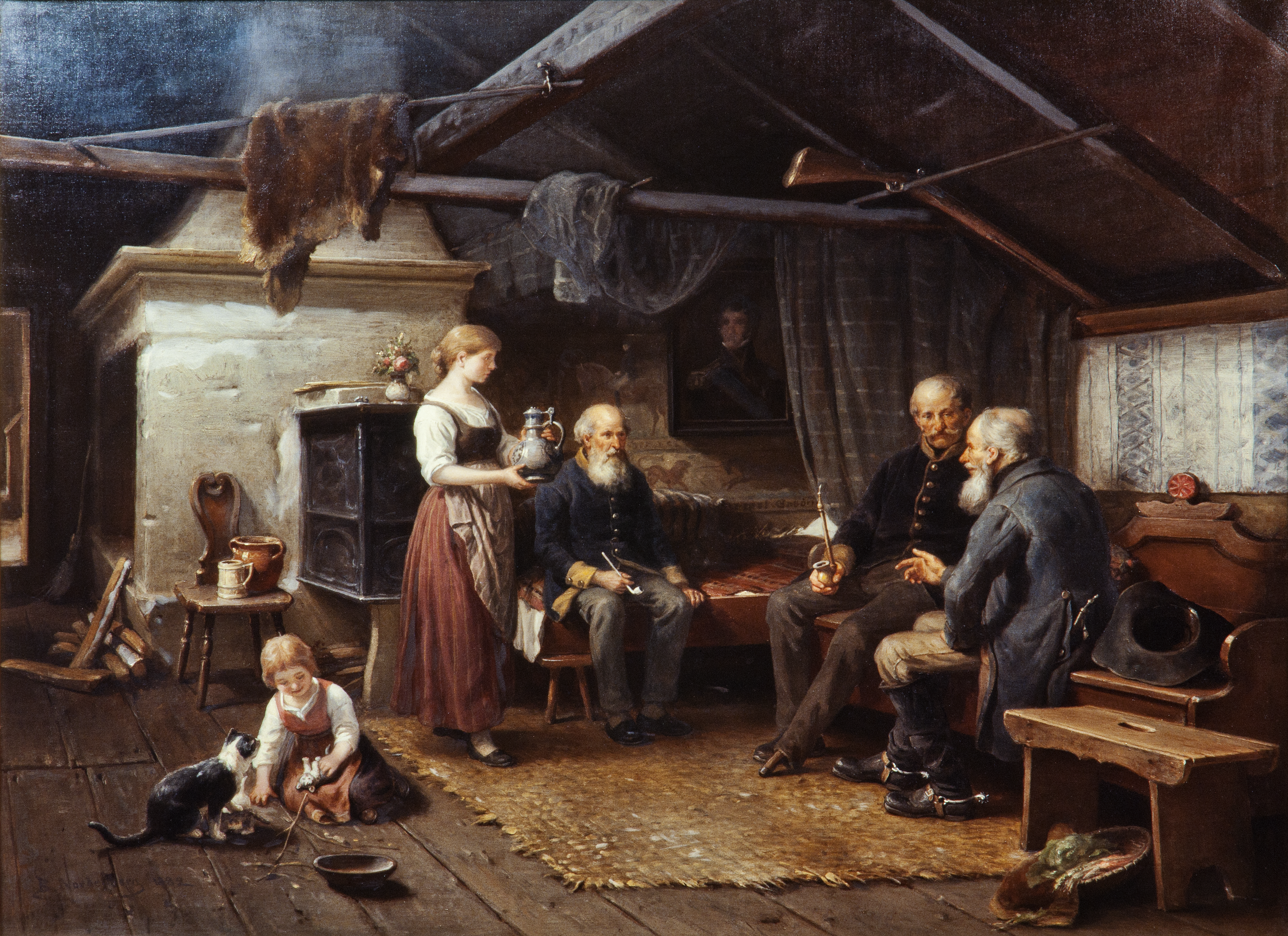
The Veterans (From Days Gone By), Bengt Nordenberg, 1882, Hallwyl Museum

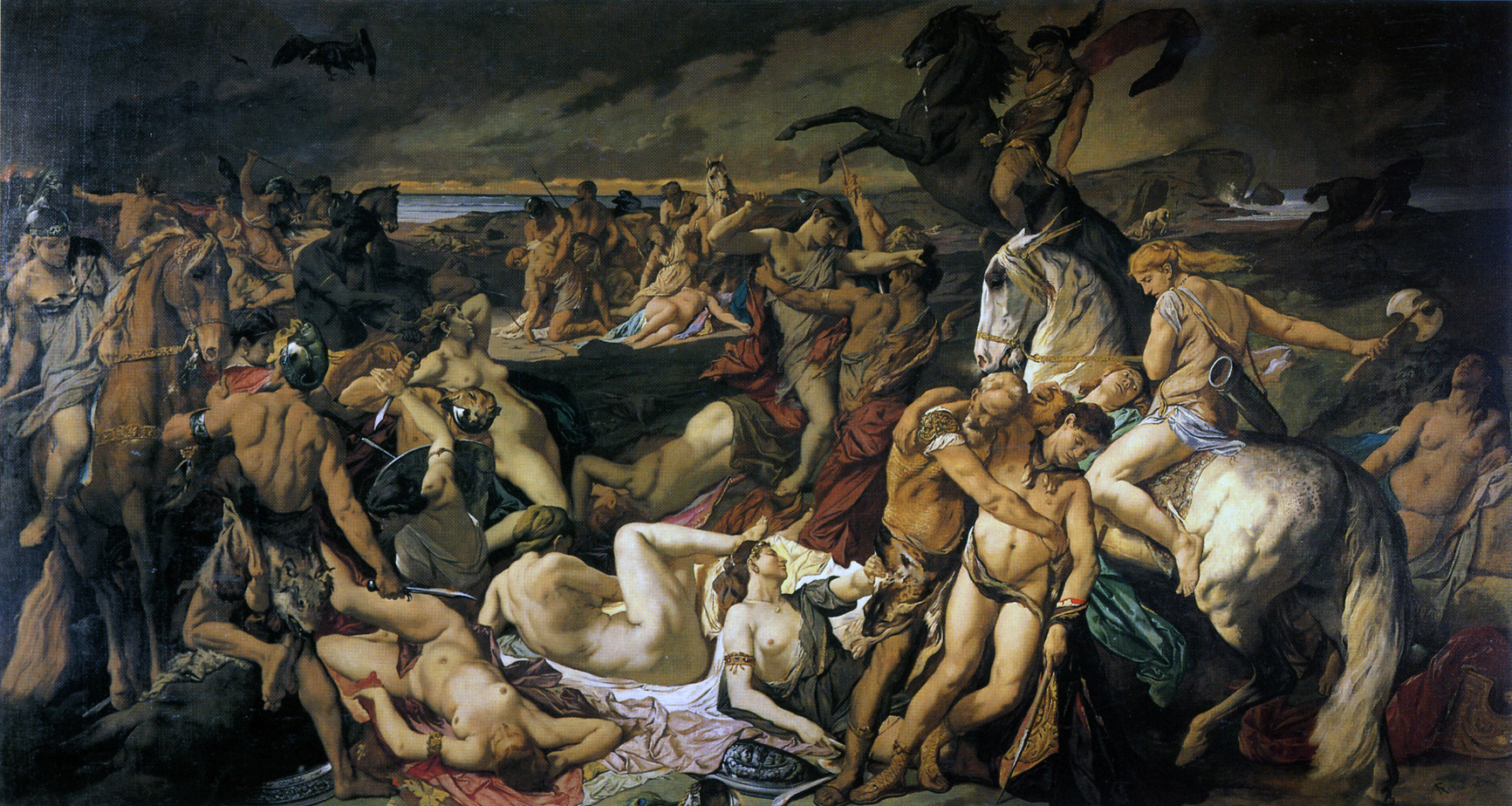
Die Amazonenschlacht, Anselm Feuerbach, 1873

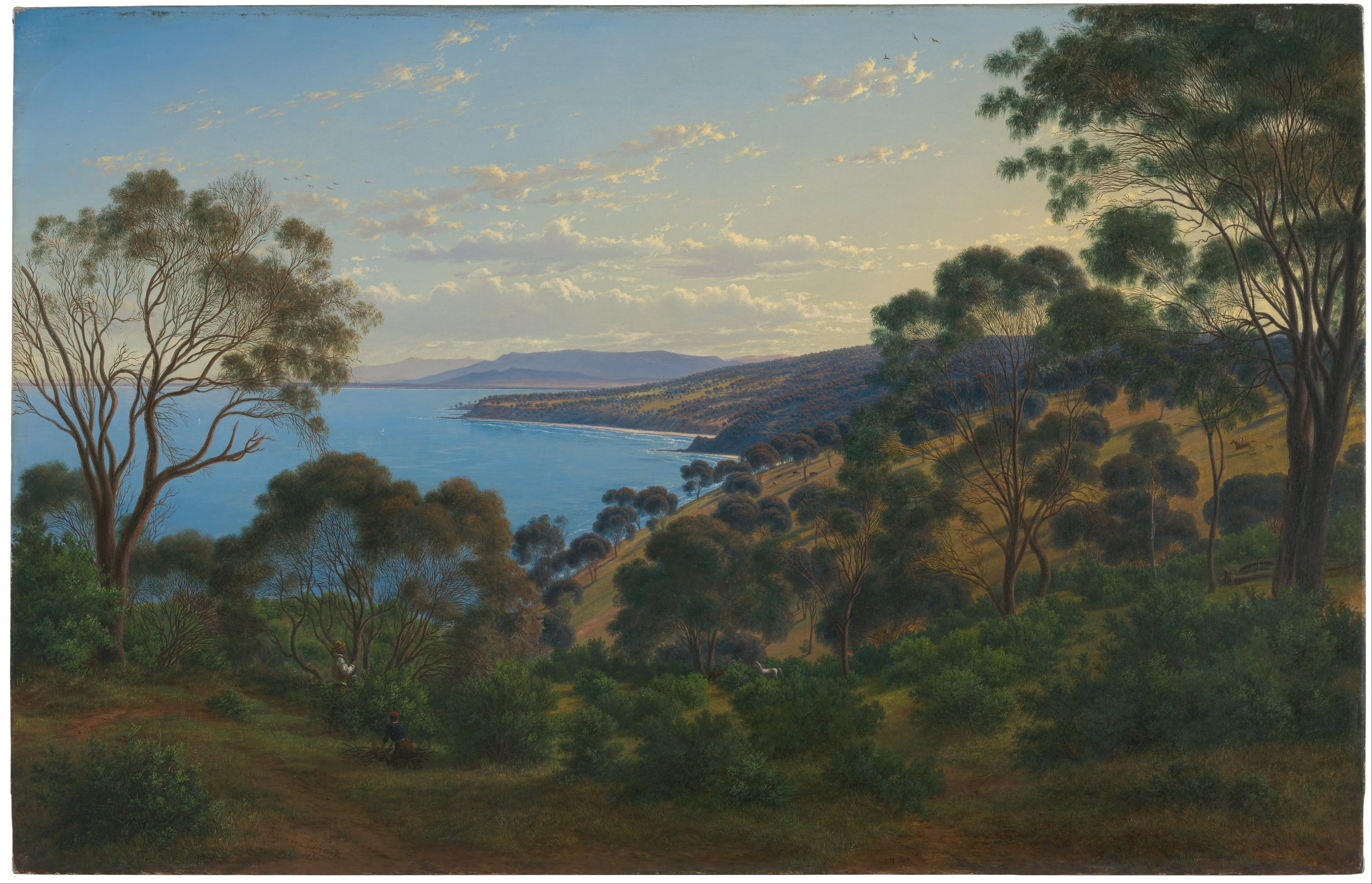
Dandenong Ranges from Beleura, Eugene von Guerard, 1870

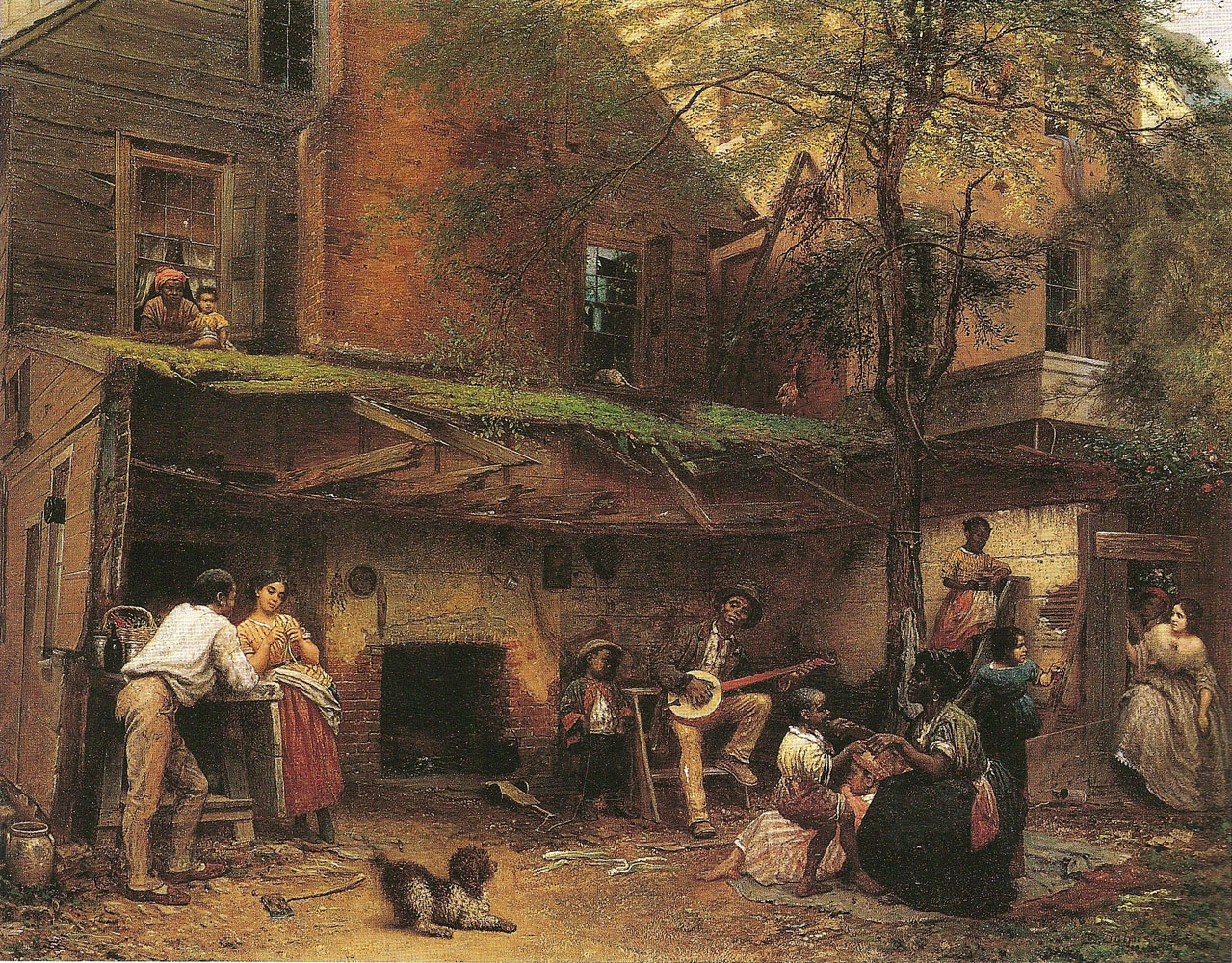
Negro Life at the South, Eastman Johnson, 1859

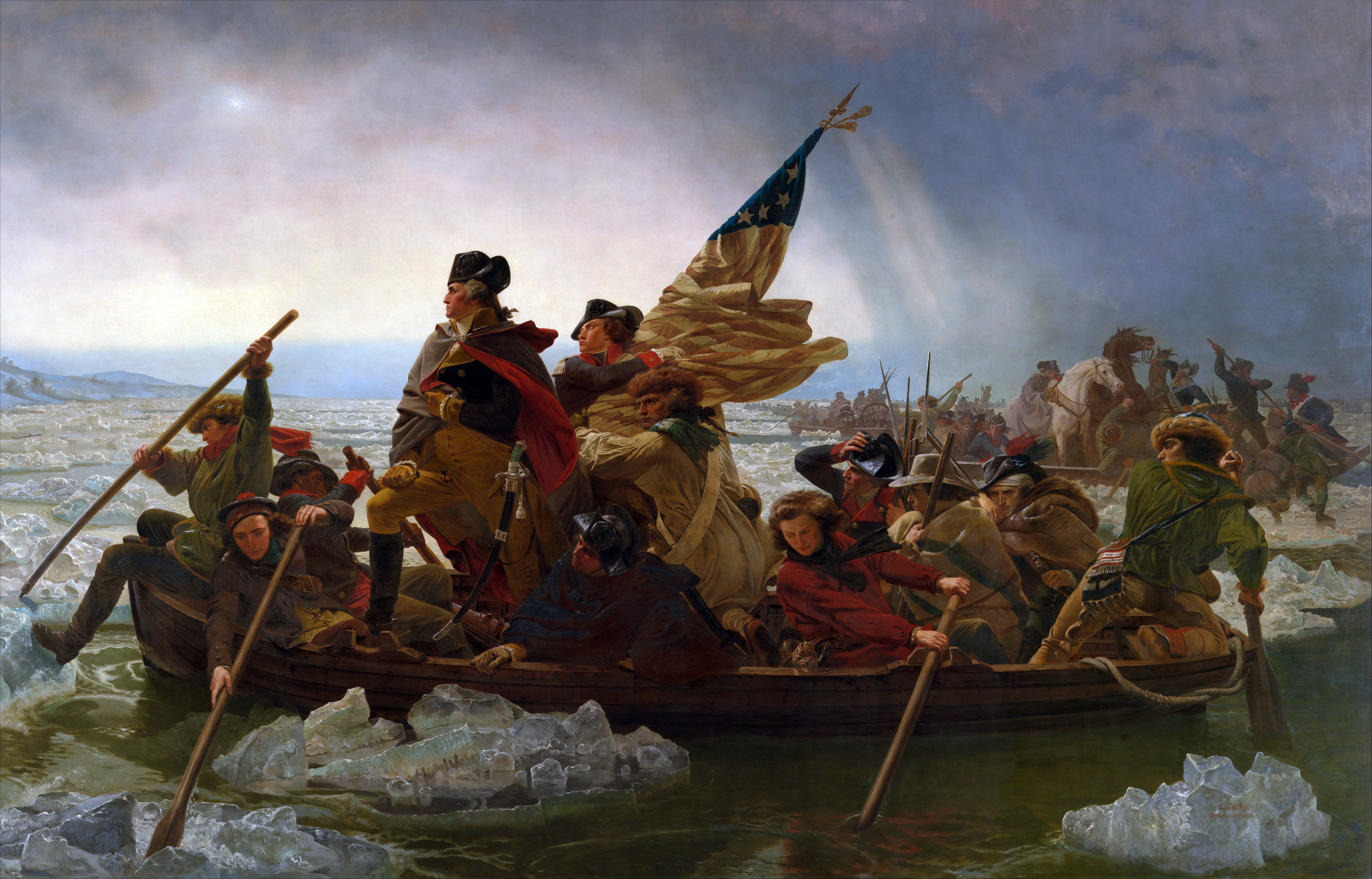
Washington Crossing the Delaware, Emanuel Leutze, 1851

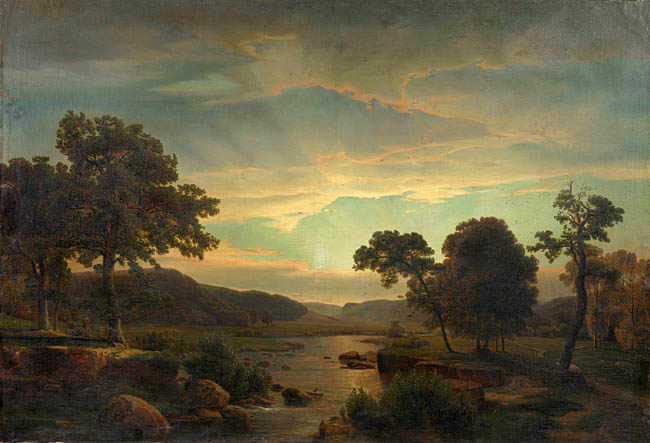
Romantische Landschaft, Carl Friedrich Lessing

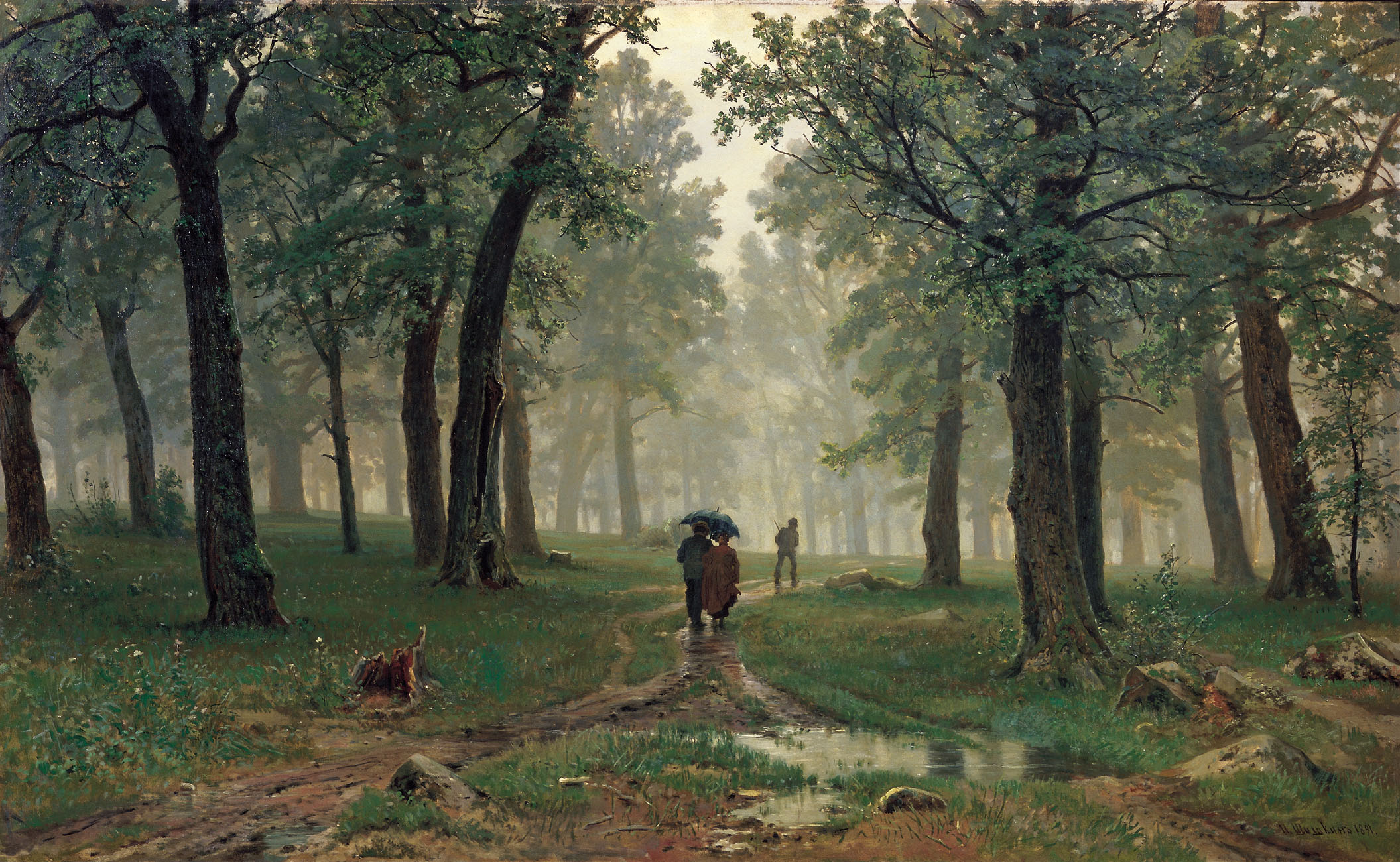
Rain in an oak forest, Ivan Shishkin, 1891

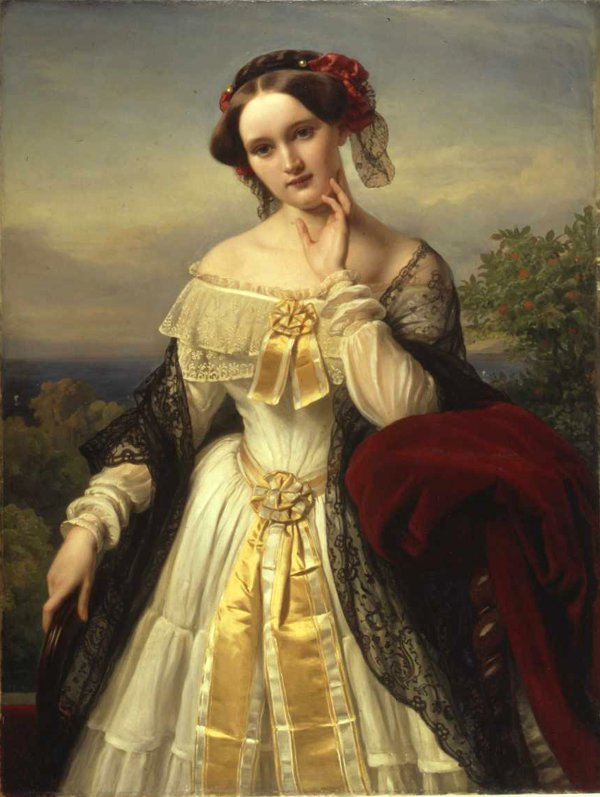
Mathilde Wesendonck, Karl Ferdinand Sohn, 1850

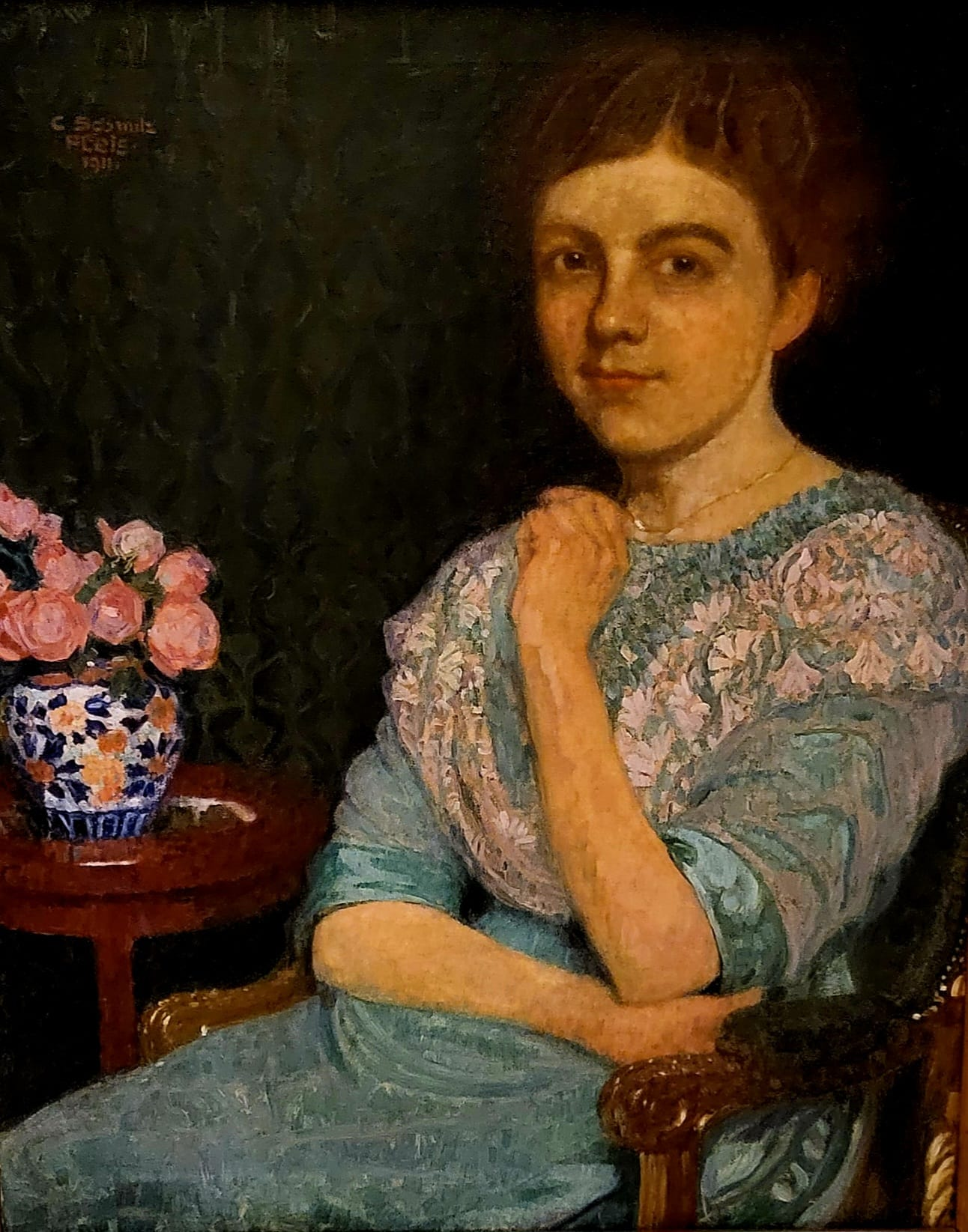
Lady in Aquamarine, Carl Schmitz-Pleis, 1911

Between 1819 and 1918, some 4000 artists belonged to the Düsseldorf school of painting, including:

=== A ===
- Victoria Åberg (1824–1892)
- Andreas Achenbach (1815–1910)
- Oswald Achenbach (1827–1905)
- Hermann Anschütz (1802–1880)
- Peter Nicolai Arbo (1831–1892)
- Louis Asher (1804–1878)
- Anders Askevold (1834–1900)

=== B ===
- Hans von Bartels (1856–1913)
- William Holbrook Beard (1823–1900)
- August Becker (1821–1887)
- Jakob Becker (1810–1872)
- Peter Behrens (1868–1940)
- Gunnar Berg (1863–1893)
- Ludolph Berkemeier (1864–1931)
- Edward Beyer (1820–1865)
- Albert Bierstadt (1830–1902)
- George Caleb Bingham (1811–1879)
- Georg Bleibtreu (1828–1892)
- Arnold Böcklin (1827–1901)
- Erik Bodom (1829–1879)
- Friedrich Boser (1809–1881)
- August Bromeis (1813–1881)
- Wilhelm Busch (1832–1908)
- Anton Bütler (1819–1874)
- Joseph Niklaus Bütler (1822–1885)

=== C ===
- Alexandre Calame (1810–1864)
- Wilhelm Camphausen (1818–1885)
- August Cappelen (1827–1852)
- Gustaf Cederström (1845–1933)
- Fanny Churberg (1845–1892)
- Johann Wilhelm Cordes (1824–1869)
- Peter von Cornelius (1783–1867)
- Ludwig des Coudres (1820–1878)
- Ernest Crofts (1847–1911)
- Georg Heinrich Crola (1804–1879)
- David Edward Cronin (1839–1925)

=== D ===
- Hans Dahl (1849–1937)
- Herminia Borchard Dassel (1839-1846)
- Ernst Deger (1809–1885)
- Anton Dietrich (1833–1904)
- Eugen Dücker (1841–1916)

=== E ===
- Adam Eberle (1804–1832)
- Marie Egner (1850–1940)

=== F ===
- Joseph Fay (1813–1875)
- Anselm Feuerbach (1829–1880)
- Albert Flamm (1823–1906)
- Arnold Forstmann (1842–?)
- Friedrich Friedländer (1825–1901)
- Bernhard Fries (1820–1879)
- Otto Frölicher (1840–1890)
- Hermann Fuechsel (1833–1915)

=== G ===
- Julius Geertz (1837–1902)
- Sanford Robinson Gifford (1823–1880)
- Hans Fredrik Gude (1825–1903)
- Eugene von Guerard (1811–1901)

=== H ===
- Aasta Hansteen (1824–1908)
- James McDougal Hart (1828–1901)
- William Stanley Haseltine (1835–1900)
- Johann Peter Hasenclever (1810–1853)
- Lars Hertervig (1830–1902)
- George Hetzel (1826–1899)
- Hermann Ottomar Herzog (1832–1932)
- Theodor Hildebrandt (1804–1874)
- Robert Alexander Hillingford (1828–1904)
- Bernhard Hoetger (1874–1949)
- Oskar Hoffmann (1851–1912)
- Adolfo Hohenstein (1854–1928)
- Julius Hübner (1806–1882)
- Emil Hünten (1827–1902)
- William Morris Hunt (1824–1879)
- Otto Hupp (1859–1949)

=== I ===
- Franz Ittenbach (1813–1879)

=== J ===
- Otto Reinhold Jacobi (1812–1901)
- Elisabeth Jerichau-Baumann (1819–1881)
- August Jernberg (1826–1896)
- Eastman Johnson (1824–1906)

=== K ===
- Arthur Kampf (1864–1950)
- Wilhelm von Kaulbach (1805–1874)
- William Keith (1838–1911)
- César Klein (1876–1954)
- Julian Klein von Diepold (1868–1947)
- Louis Henry Weston Klingender (1861–1950)
- Ludwig Knaus (1829–1910)
- Heinrich Christoph Kolbe (1771–1836)
- Rudolf Koller (1828–1905)
- Julius Kronberg (1850–1921)

=== L ===
- Ants Laikmaa (1860–1942)
- Marcus Larson (1825–1864)
- Wilhelm Lehmbruck (1881–1919)
- Carl Friedrich Lessing (1808–1880)
- Emanuel Leutze (1816–1868)
- Bruno Liljefors (1860–1939)
- Amalia Lindegren (1814–1891)
- George Luks (1867–1933)

=== M ===
- August Macke (1887–1914)
- Fritz Mackensen (1866–1953)
- August Malmström (1829–1901)
- Gari Melchers (1860–1932)
- Carlo Mense (1886–1965)
- Johann Georg Meyer (1813–1886)
- Otto Modersohn (1865–1943)
- Heinrich Mücke (1806–1891)
- Andreas Müller (1811–1890)
- Morten Müller (1828–1911)
- Paul Müller-Kaempff (1861–1941)
- Mihály Munkácsy (1844–1900)
- Ludvig Munthe (1841–1896)

=== N ===
- Amaldus Nielsen (1838–1932)
- Wilhelm Theodor Nocken (1830–1905)
- Bengt Nordenberg (1822–1902)
- Victorine Nordenswan (1838—1872)
- Adelsteen Normann (1848–1918)
- Adolph Northen (1828–1876)

=== O ===
- Theobald von Oer (1807–1885)

=== P ===
- Eduard Peithner von Lichtenfels (1833–1913)
- Carl von Perbandt (1832–1911)
- Heinrich Petersen-Angeln (1850–1906)
- Maksymilian Piotrowski (1813–1875)
- Eduard Wilhelm Pose (1812–1878)
- Johann Wilhelm Preyer (1803–1889)

=== R ===
- Kristjan Raud (1865–1943)
- Paul Raud (1865–1930)
- Robert Reinick (1805–1852)
- Alfred Rethel (1816–1859)
- Karl Lorenz Rettich (1841–1904)
- Henry Ritter (1816–1853)
- Theodor Rocholl (1854–1933)

=== S ===
- Hubert Salentin (1822–1910)
- Johann Wilhelm Schirmer (1807–1863)
- Carl Schmitz-Pleis (1877–1943)
- Julius Schrader (1815–1900)
- Adolf Schreyer (1828–1899)
- Adolf Seel (1829–1907)
- Ivan Shishkin (1838–1898)
- Karl Ferdinand Sohn (1805–1867)
- Alfred Sohn-Rethel (1875–1958)
- Karli Sohn-Rethel (1882–1966)
- Hermine Stilke (1804–1869)
- Bernhard Studer (1832–1868)

=== T ===
- Adolph Tidemand (1814–1876)

=== U ===
- Carl d'Unker (1828–1866)
- Lesser Ury (1861–1931)

=== V ===
- Frederick Vezin (1859–1942)
- Heinrich Vogeler (1872–1942)

=== W ===
- Alfred Wahlberg (1834–1906)
- Edward Arthur Walton (1860–1922)
- Worthington Whittredge (1820–1910)
- Charles Wimar (1828–1862)
- Mårten Eskil Winge (1825–1896)
- Richard Caton Woodville (1825–1855)
- Magnus von Wright (1805–1868)

=== Z ===
- Clemens von Zimmermann (1788–1869)
