= Ludvig Munthe =

German painter

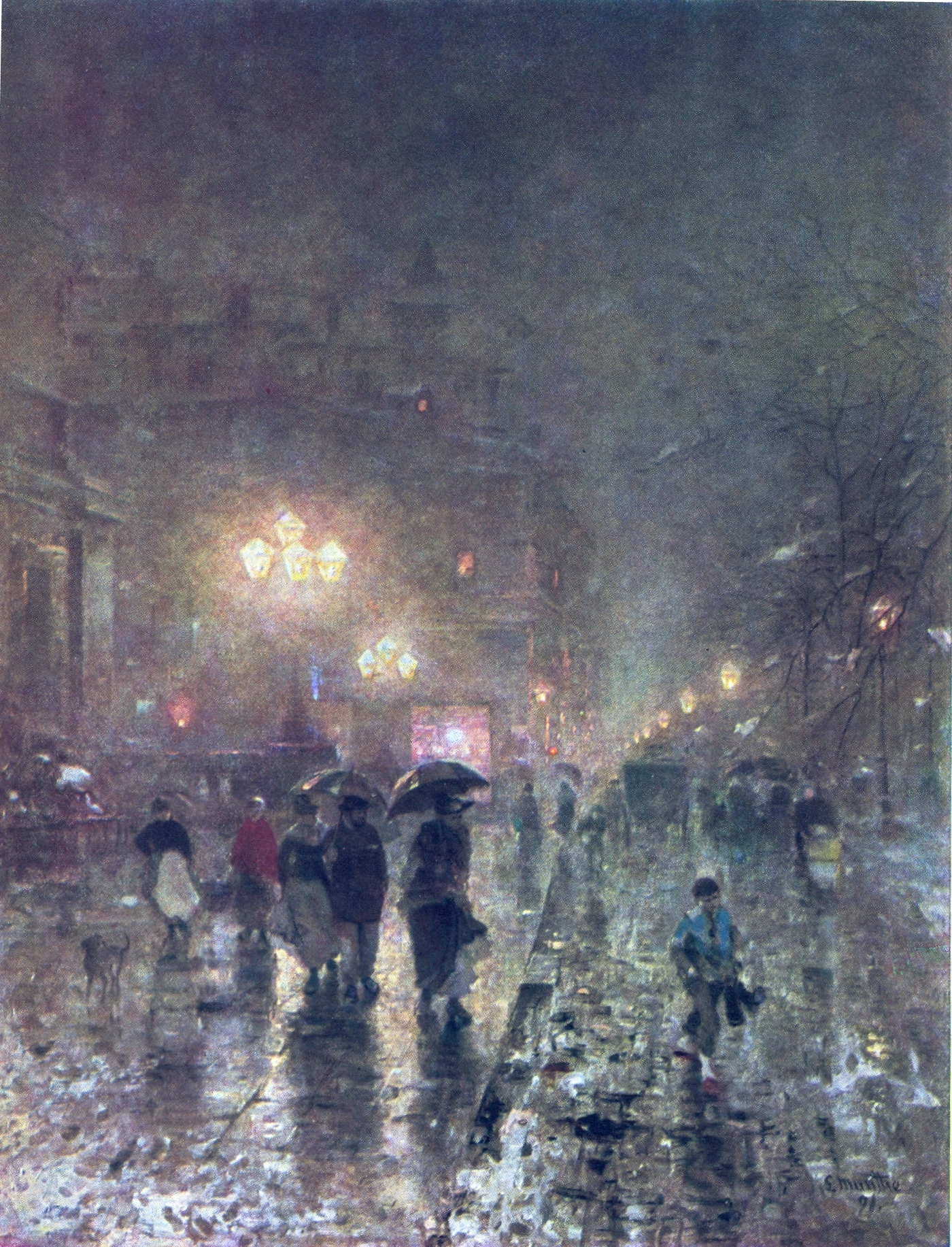
Stadttheater Düsseldorf and the Alleestraße (1891)

Ludvig Munthe (11 March 1841 – 30 March 1896) was a Norwegian-born, German landscape painter.

== Biography ==
Ludvig Munthe was born at Årøy, near Sogndalsfjøra in Nordre Bergenhus, Norway. He came to Bergen in 1858 where he was first instructed by Franz Wilhelm Schiertz, a German painter and architect residing in Norway. Munthe later moved to Düsseldorf where he became a pupil of Albert Flamm at the Kunstakademie Düsseldorf. He subsequently selected Düsseldorf for his permanent residence.

Munthe is associated with the Düsseldorf school of painting. A thoroughly realistic treatment characterizes his paintings, of which autumn and winter scenes in stormy or gloomy weather, forest and coast views form the prevailing subjects. He was knighted with the French Legion of Honour in 1878 and was appointed Knight of the Order of St. Olav in 1881.

== Selected works ==
- Pine Forest in Winter (1870) Hamburg Gallery
- Skoginteriør (1870) National Museum of Art, Architecture and Design, Oslo
- Potetopptagning (1873) National Gallery, Oslo
- Norsk strandsted (1878) National Gallery, Oslo
- Wood Interior in Winter, with Stags (1878) National Gallery, Oslo - awarded gold medal in Paris
- Høst i skogen (1882) National Gallery, Oslo
- Sen høstettermiddag (1882) National Museum of Art, Architecture and Design, Oslo
- Birch Wood in Autumn (1886) National Gallery, Berlin
- Autumn in Holland (1895) National Gallery, Berlin

== Gallery ==
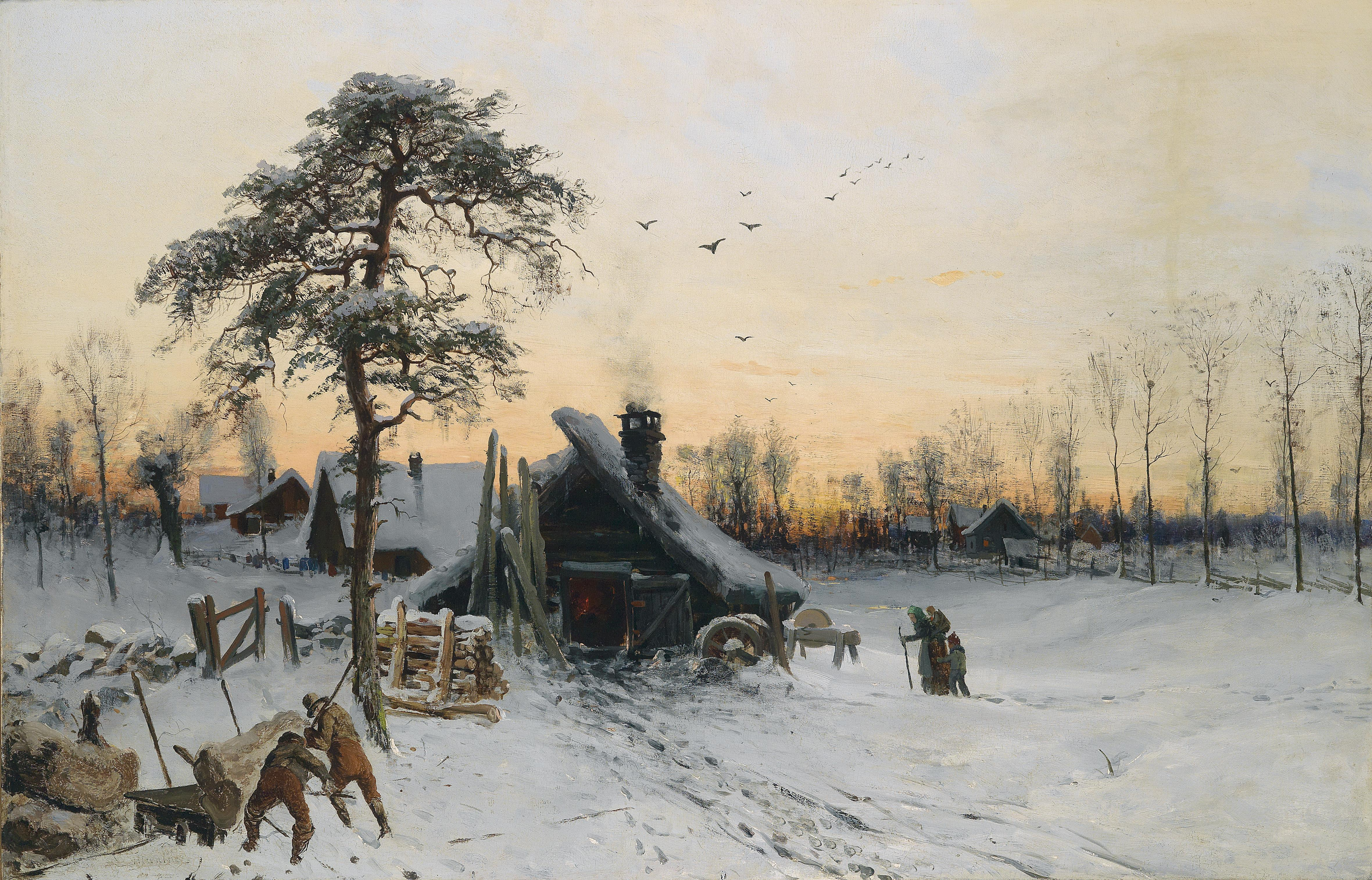
Winter Landscape in Evening Light (by 1896)

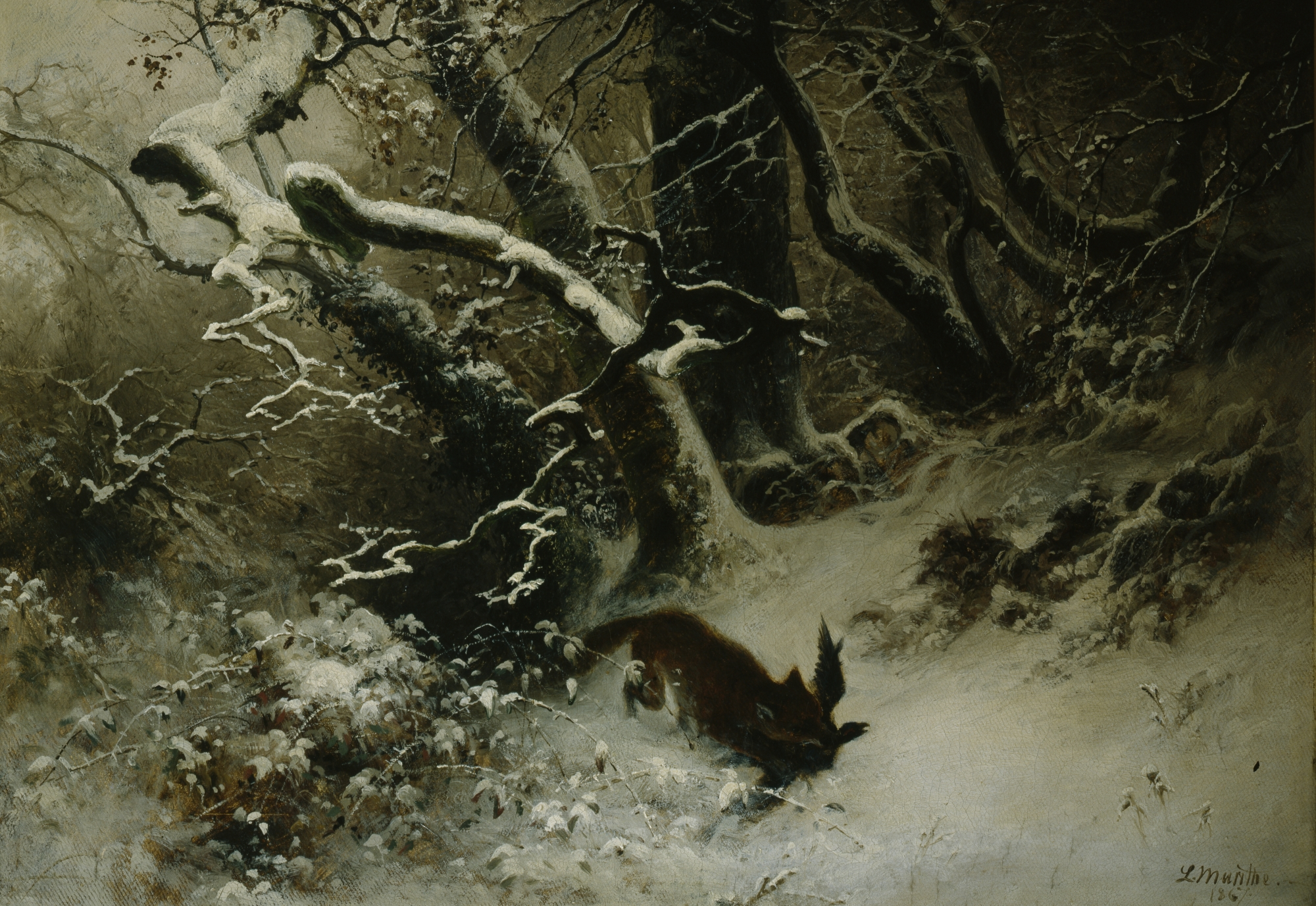
Winter Landscape (1868)

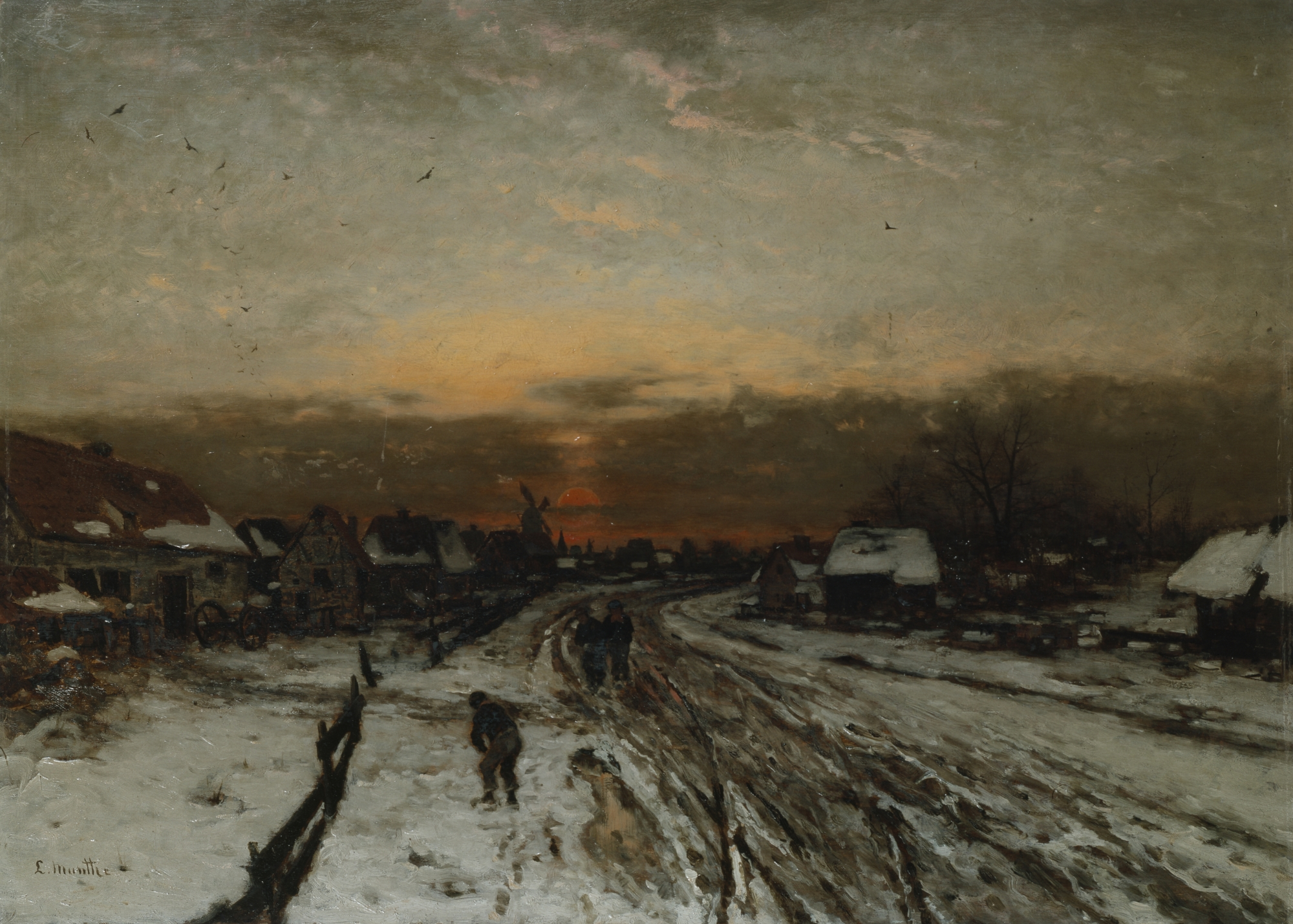
Winter Landscape at Sunset

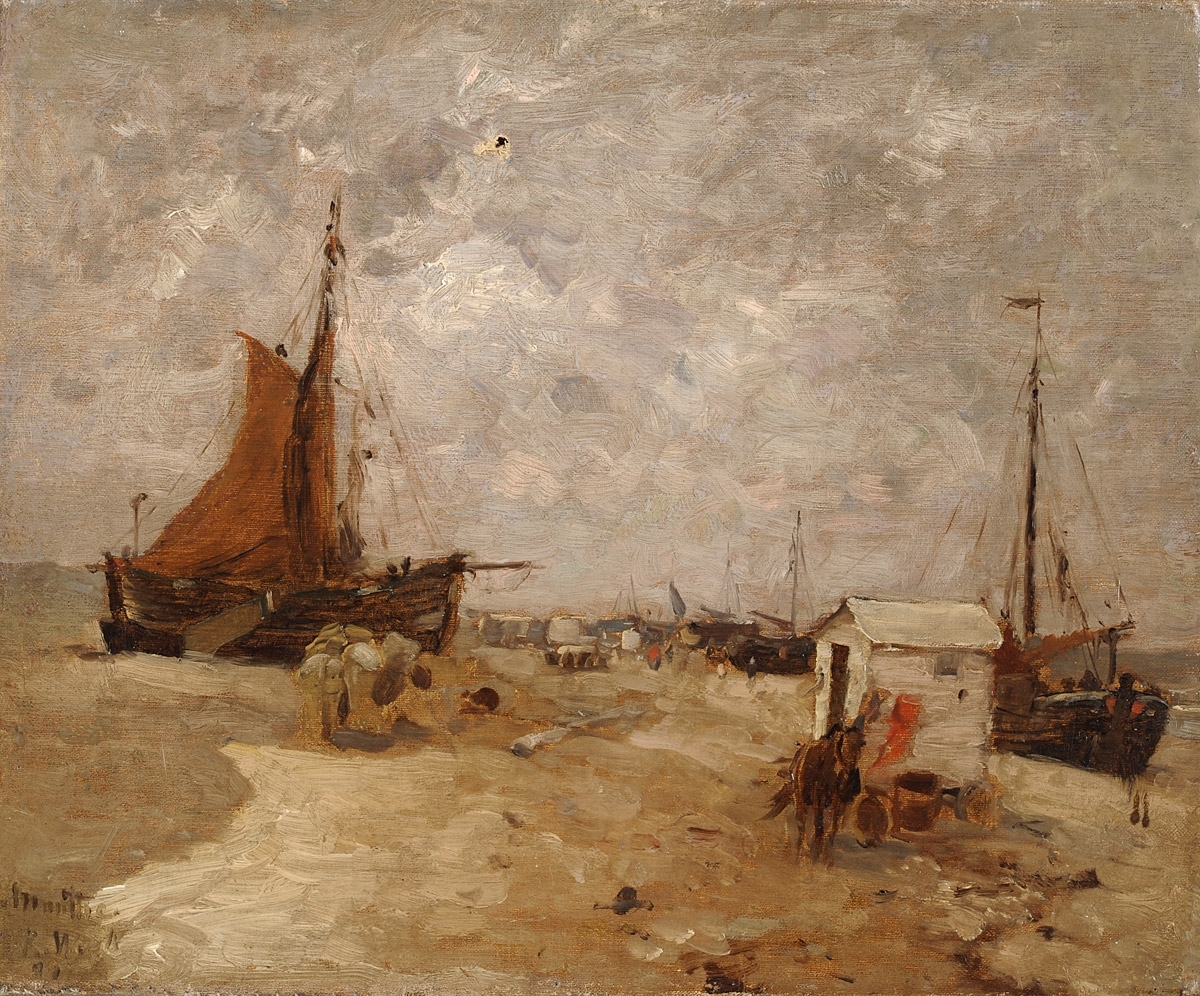
Dutch Fishermen (by 1896)

== Other sources ==
- Munthe, Sverre (1994) Familien Munthe i Norge (Oslo: S. Munthe) ISBN 978-8299332101
- Malmanger, Magne (1981) Norsk malerkunst fra klassisisme til tidlig realisme (Oslo: Nasjonalgalleriet)
