= Georg Heinrich Crola =

German painter

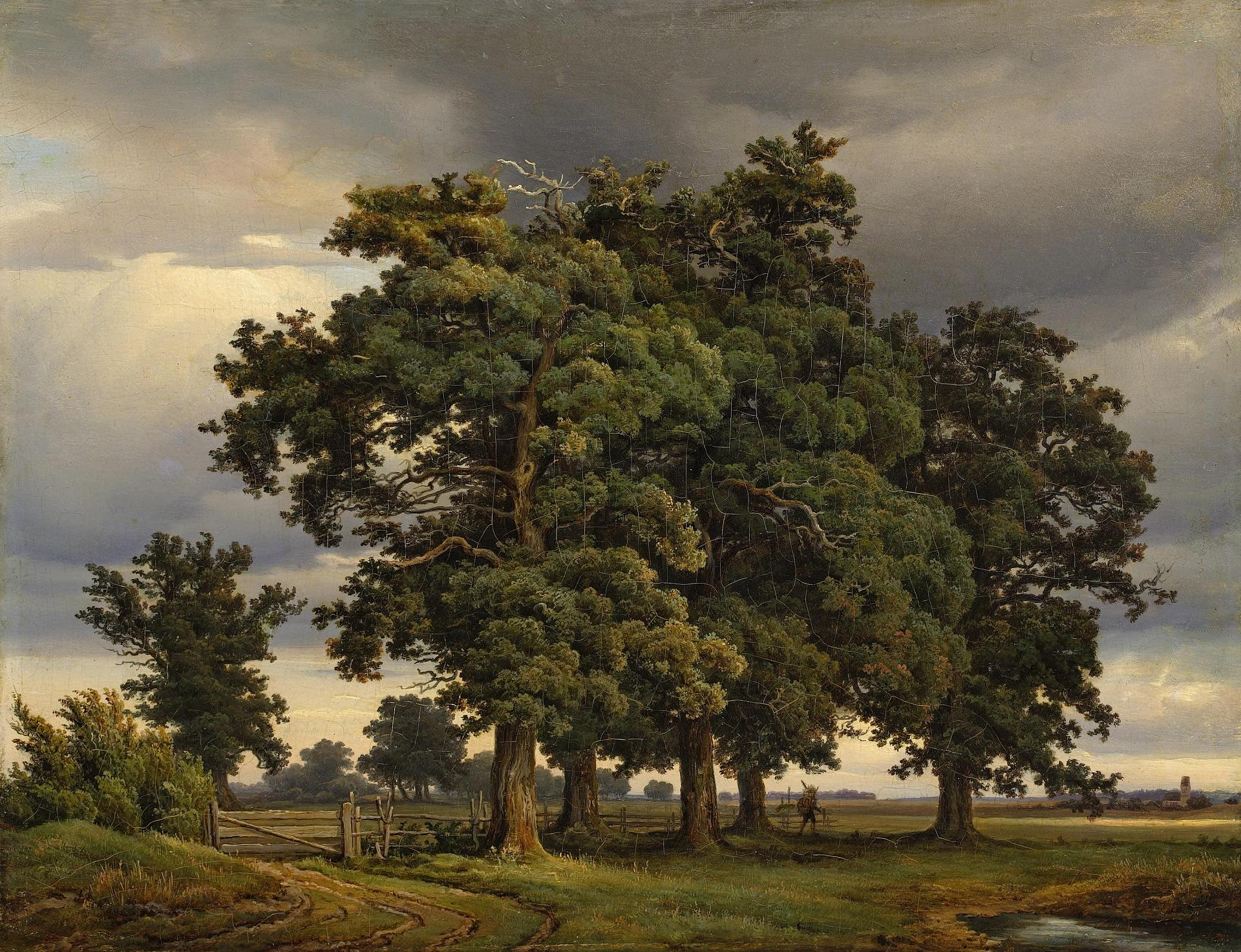
Oaks, 1833

Georg Heinrich Crola (6 June 1804 – 6 May 1879) was a German landscape painter in the mid-19th century. He specialized in the representation of the German forest.

== Life ==
Georg Heinrich Crola was born in Dresden in 1804, the son of the merchant Croll. Difficult domestic conditions forced his parents to send the four year-old Georg Heinrich to live in the family of his maternal grandfather, who was a painter at the Royal Porcelain Factory and an art teacher at the state boarding school of Meissen. His grandfather, recognising his artistic talent, introduced him in Dresden to the painters Johann Christian Klengel, Johann David Schubert and Johann Gottfried Jentzsch who took charge of his education.

After the death of his grandfather in 1822 he lived for a while a wandering life. Around this time he also changed his family name from Croll to Crola so as to avoid conscription by the Saxon government. Around 1823 he was back in Dresden where he made a living from painting boxes. He succeeded in capturing the attention of Caspar David Friedrich and Johan Christian Dahl who assisted him in his studies. His talent was also recognised by Ernest I, Duke of Saxe-Coburg and Gotha who gave him commissions to paint landscapes and castles in Gotha. He used the opportunity to paint many landscapes of the Gotha region.

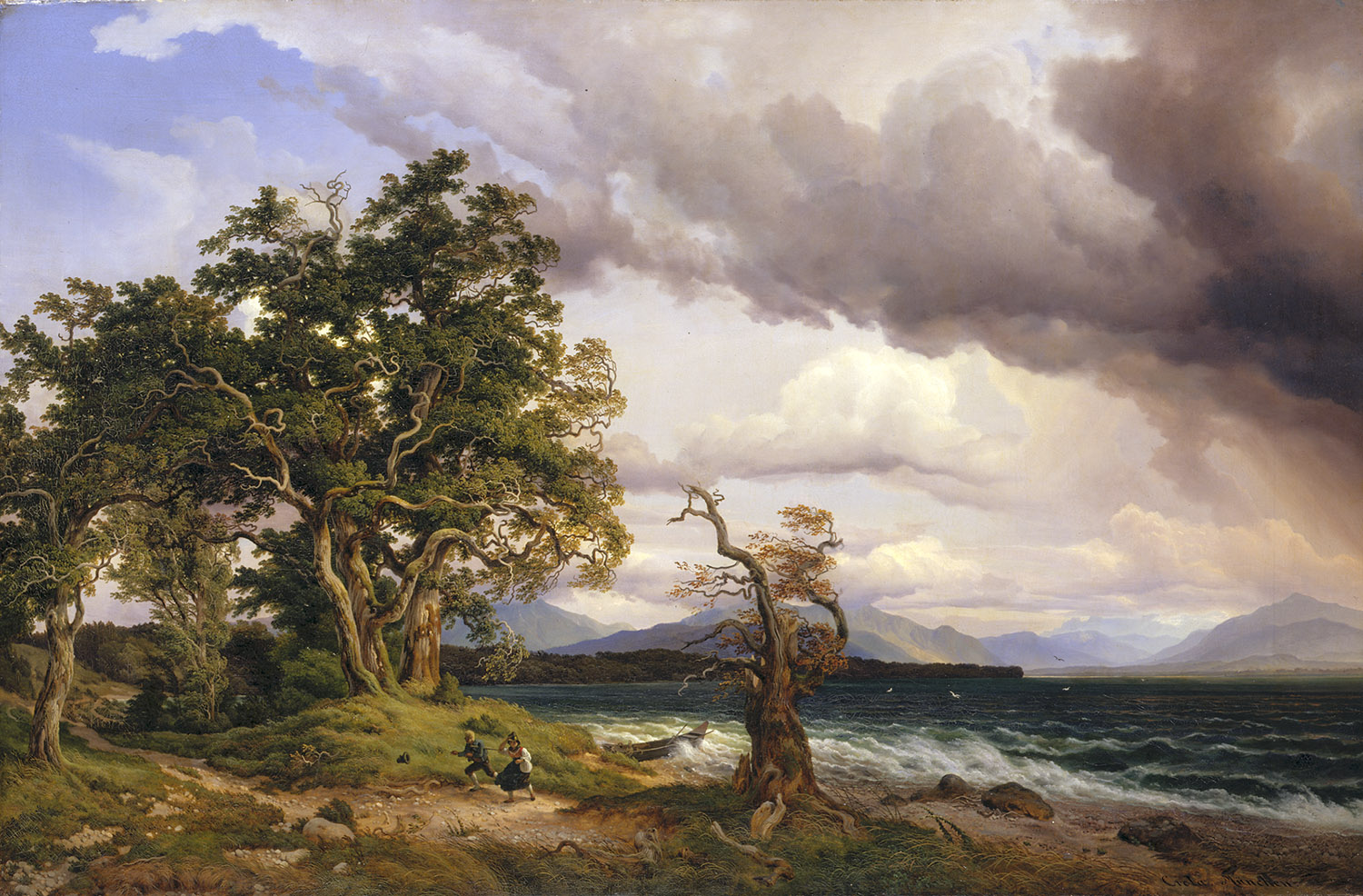
A Thunderstorm on Lake Chiemsee, 1833

Crola went to Munich in 1830, where he studied the old masters as well as the neighboring landscapes. He traveled later to northern Germany where he got to know work of the Düsseldorf school of painting.

He later visited Berlin where he met his future bride Elise (Elisabeth) Concordia, daughter of a banker and an amateur painter herself. The couple got married in 1840 in Ilsenburg am Harz and the couple settled there. The pair founded a school for romantic landscape painters.

From that time onwards the surrounding low mountains became Crola's most important source of inspiration.

Crola died in Ilsenburg on 6 May 1879.
