= Louis Asher =

German artist

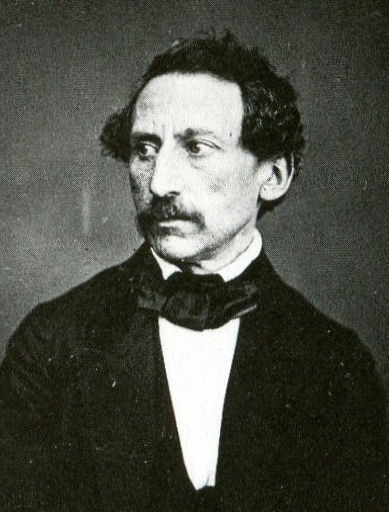
Louis Asher by Carl Ferdinand Stelzner

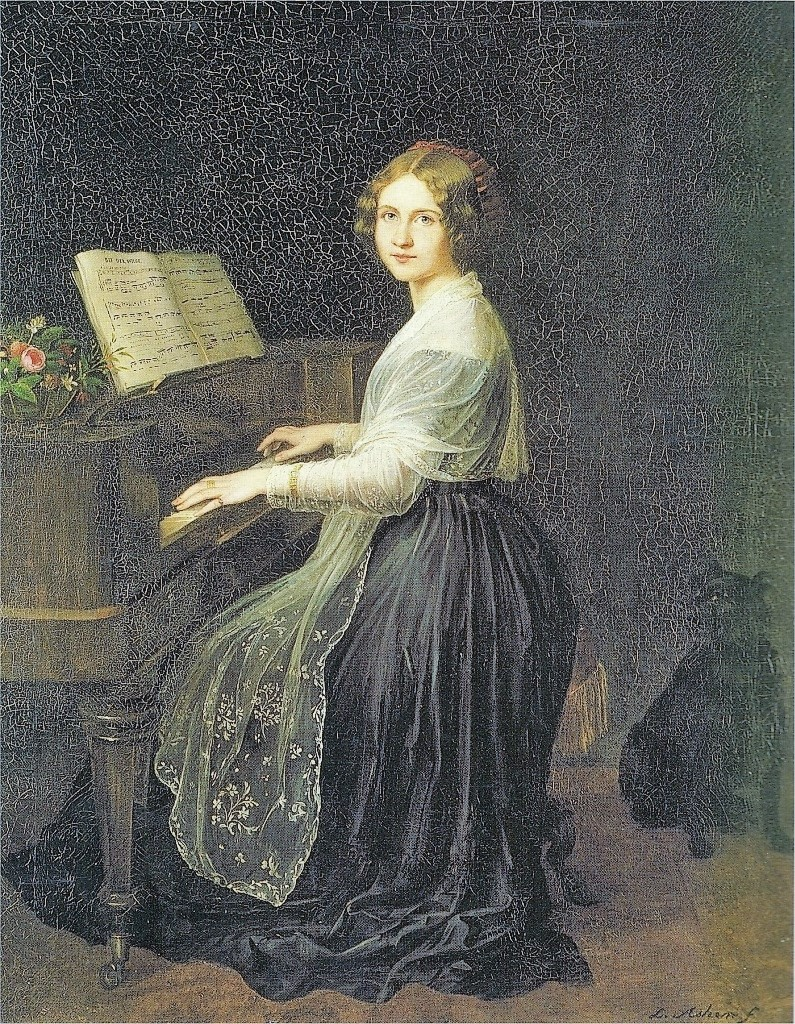
Portrait of Jenny Lind, 1845.

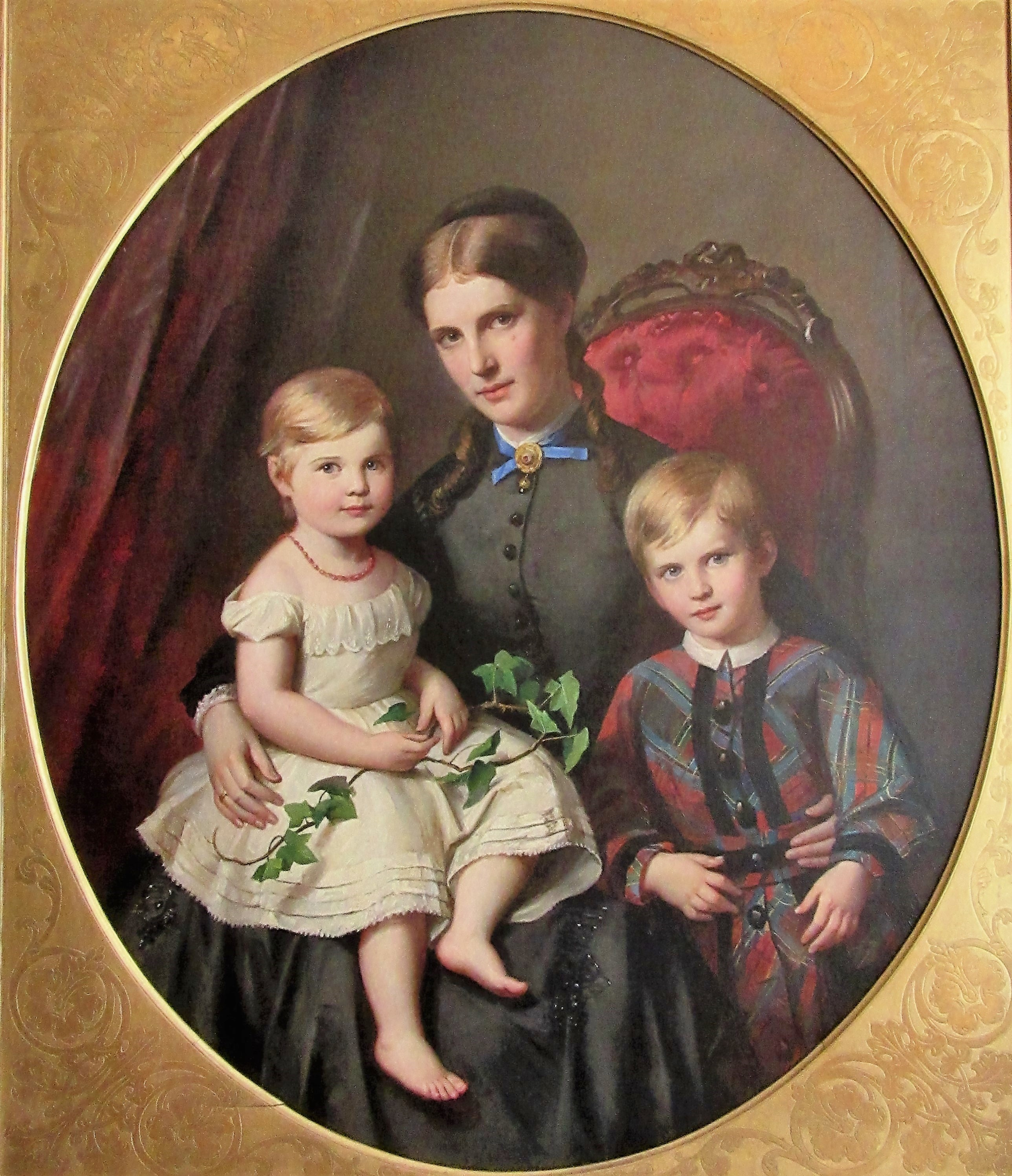
Mrs. Fehling with her children (circa 1867) by Louis Asher

Louis Asher, originally Julius Ludwig Asher, (1804–1878) was a German artist.

== Life ==
Asher was born at Hamburg on 26 June 1804. He studied there under Gerdt Hardorf and Leo Lehmann, and in 1821 went for further instruction to Dresden, and from there to Düsseldorf, where he entered the studio of Cornelius. There he got to know Kaulbach, with whom he continued a friendship throughout his life. In 1825 he accompanied Cornelius to Munich, where he was employed by him on the frescoes of the Glyptothek. He is associated with the Düsseldorf school of painting.

In 1827 he returned to Hamburg, and then, in 1832, went via Berlin to Italy, where he remained for three years. On his return to Germany, with the exception of a second visit to Italy in 1839 in the company of Kaulbach, he lived in Munich and in Hamburg, where he died on 7 March 1878.

== Works ==
Asher's works, which consist of historical pictures, genre paintings, and portraits, include:

- Peasant Family (1835).
- Resurrection of Christ (1851).
- King Lear with the dead body of Cordelia (1854).
- St. Cecilia.
- Maria I'Ortolana.
- Portrait of Mlle. Jenny Lind.

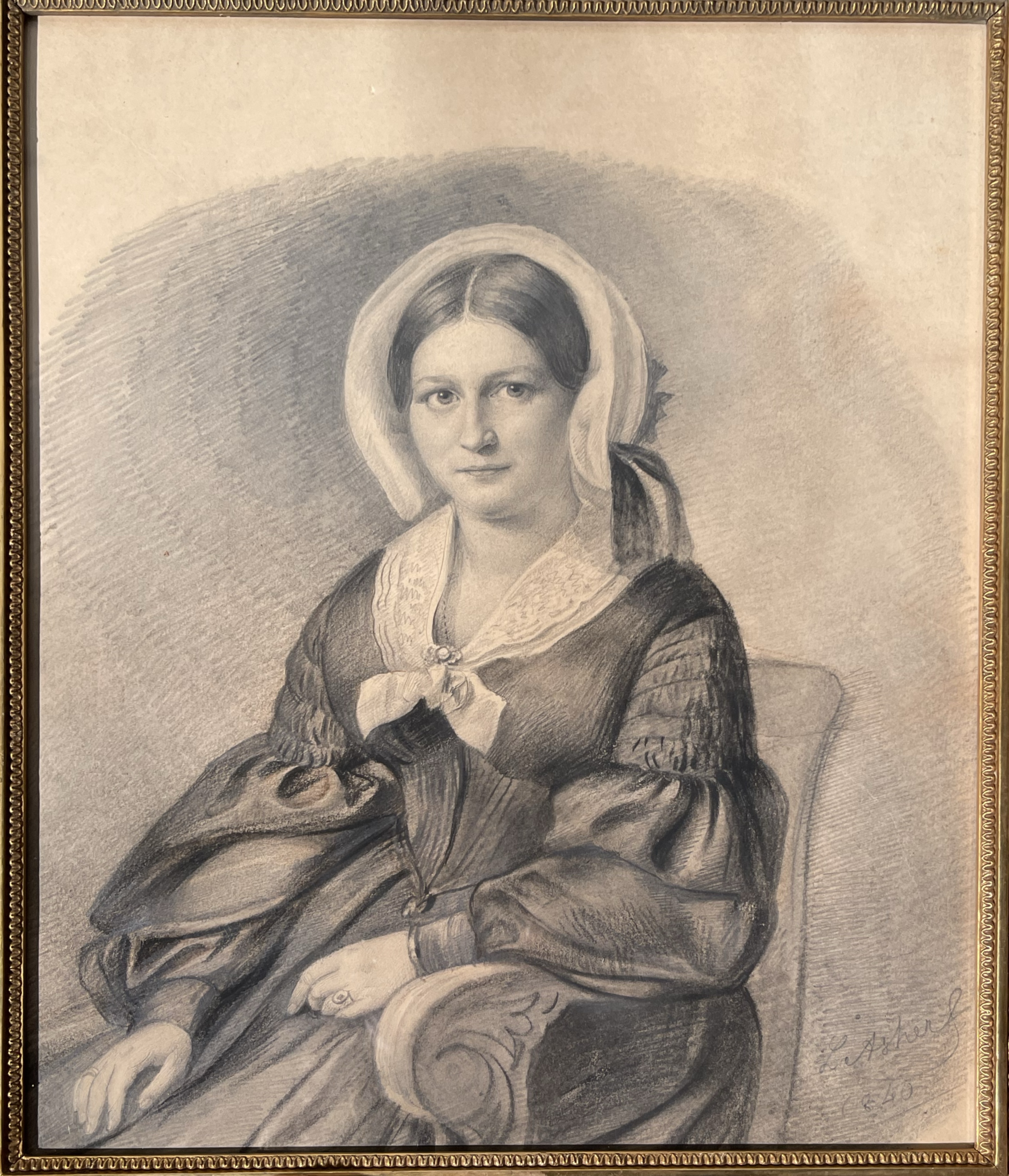
Pencil and charcoal portrait of Mathilda Arnemann Stammann 1840

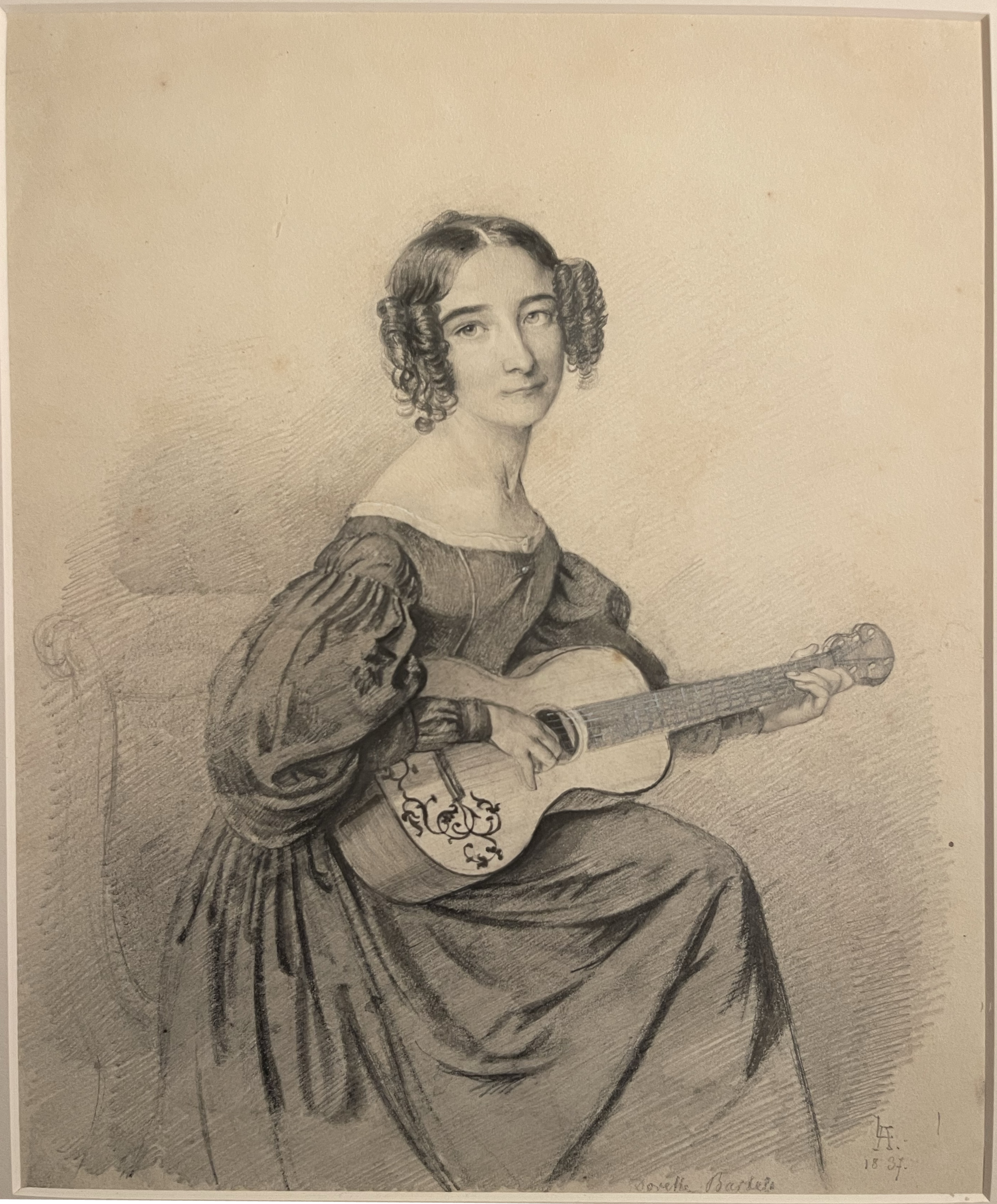
Louis Ascher portrait of Dorthe Bartels in charcoal and pencil

== See also ==
- List of German painters
