= Hubert Salentin =

German painter

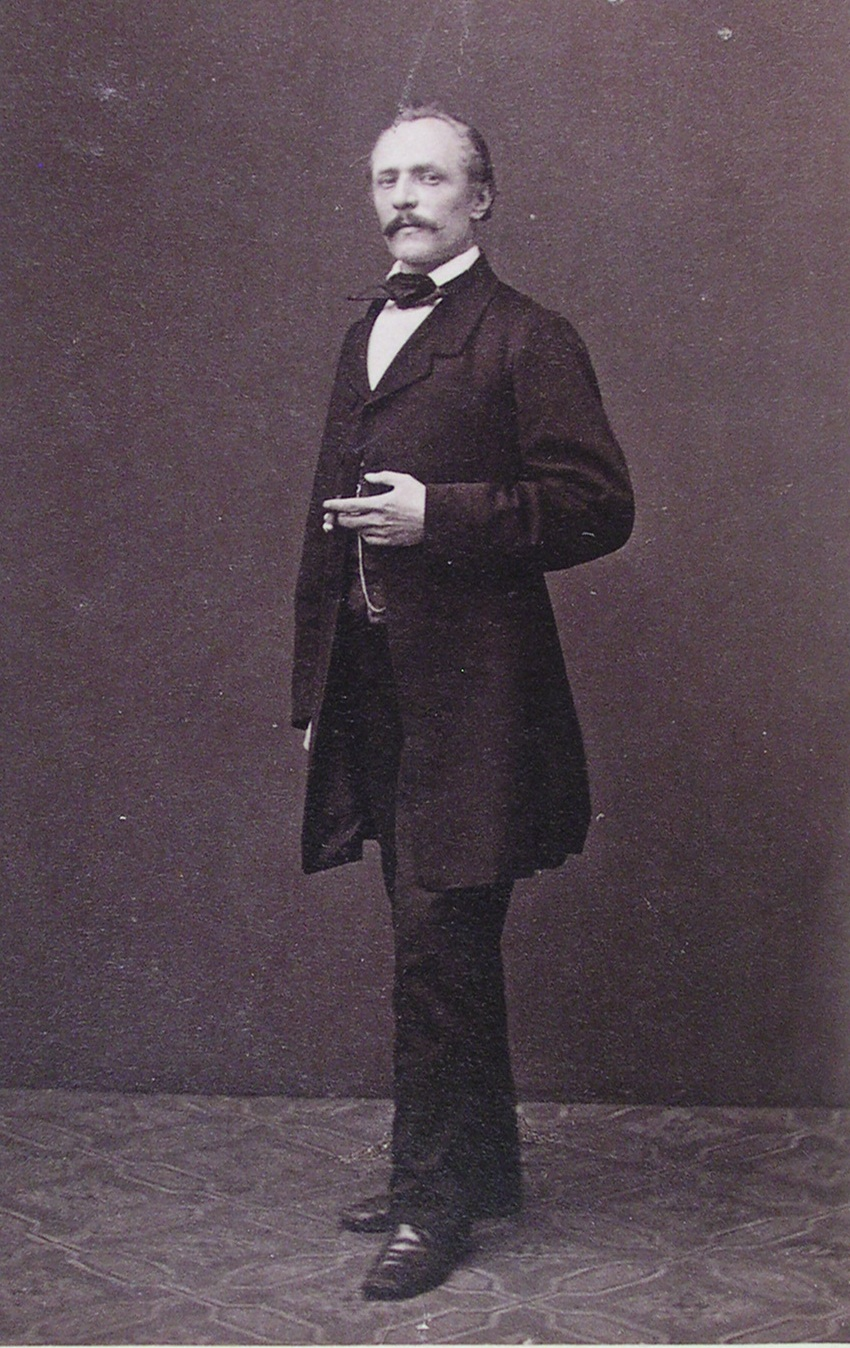
Hubert Salentin about 1865 Signature Hubert Salentin German genre painter of the Düsseldorf School

Johann Hubert Salentin (born 15 January 1822, Zülpich; died 7 July 1910, Düsseldorf) was a German painter, associated with the Düsseldorf school of painting.

Salentin was a blacksmith for 14 years. In 1850 he came to the Düsseldorf Academy, where Wilhelm von Schadow, Carl Ferdinand son Adolph Tidemand were his main teachers. His paintings express sentimental, gemütvolle, scenes from rural life in the West German countryside, which by precise drawing and the use of clear colors in liquid treatment his work excels.

Currently, paintings of Salentin are owned by art galleries and collectors all over the world. Many original paintings can be viewed at Homemuseum in Zuelpich.

Painting 1860

Painting 1880
