= Wilhelm Theodor Nocken =

German landscape painter (1830–1905)

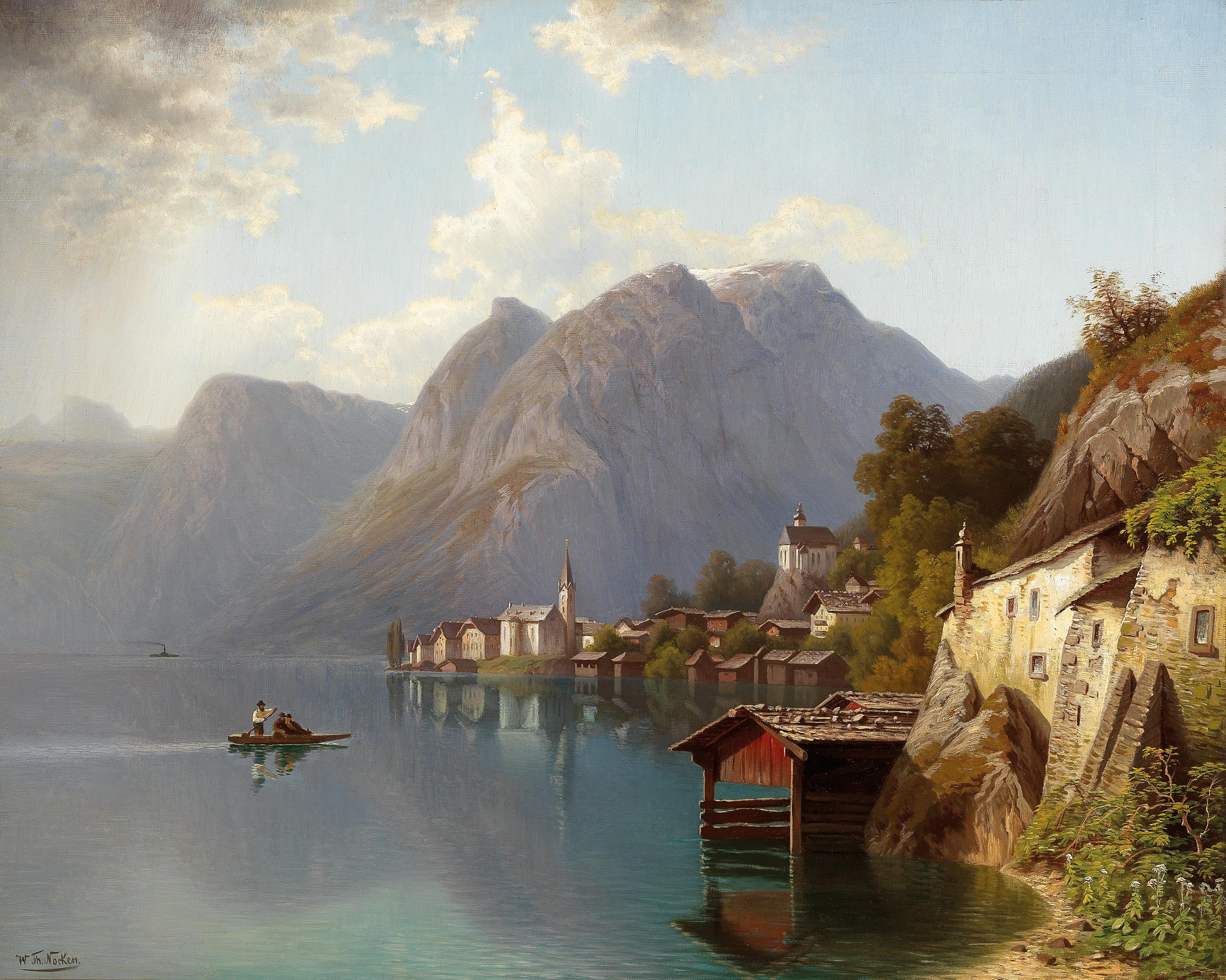
View of Hallstatt

Wilhelm Theodor Nocken (1830, Düsseldorf - 1905, Düsseldorf) was a German landscape painter of the Düsseldorf school of painting.

== Life and work ==
At the age of ten, while working as a house painter, he attended Sunday classes in free-hand drawing for artisans, led by Joseph von Keller. Three years later, he took a construction class at the Kunstakademie Düsseldorf, taught by Rudolf Wiegmann. The following year, seeking to become a professional artist, he received elementary painting instruction there. Finally, from 1847 to 1805, he studied landscape painting with Johann Wilhelm Schirmer. He had to leave during the third quarter of his last year to perform his military service.

He eventually settled in Düsseldorf and became a landscape painter. His favorite locations were in the Alps of Austria and Bavaria, which he depicted in a romantic and idyllic style. He rarely painted in the Rheinland or Westphalia; areas which were popular with other landscape artists.
