= Johann Georg Meyer =

German painter

Johann Georg Meyer von Bremen (28 October 1813 Bremen, Germany – 4 December 1886 Berlin), commonly known as Meyer von Bremen, was a German painter who specialized in Biblical, peasant, and family scenes.

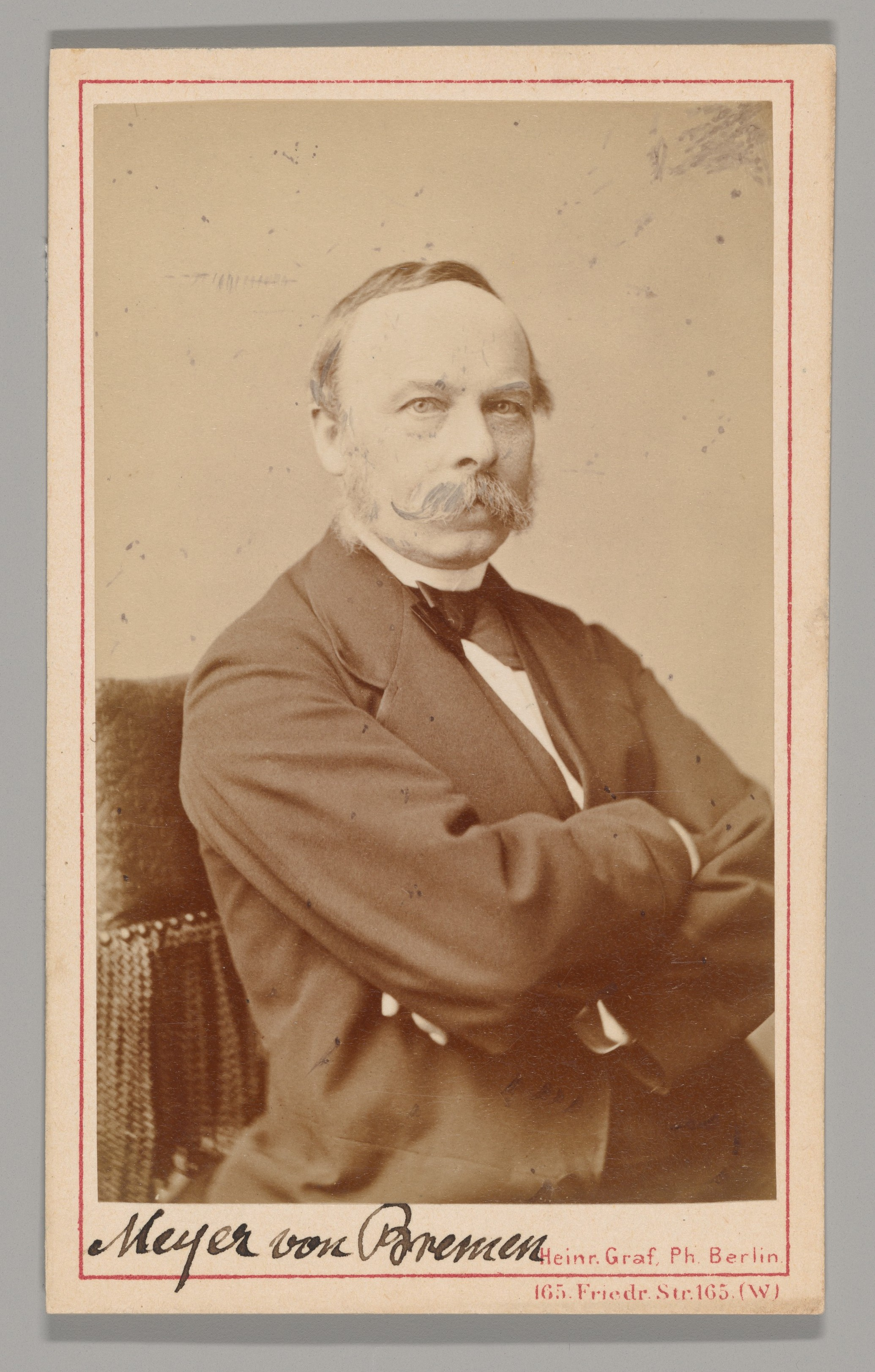
Georg Meyer

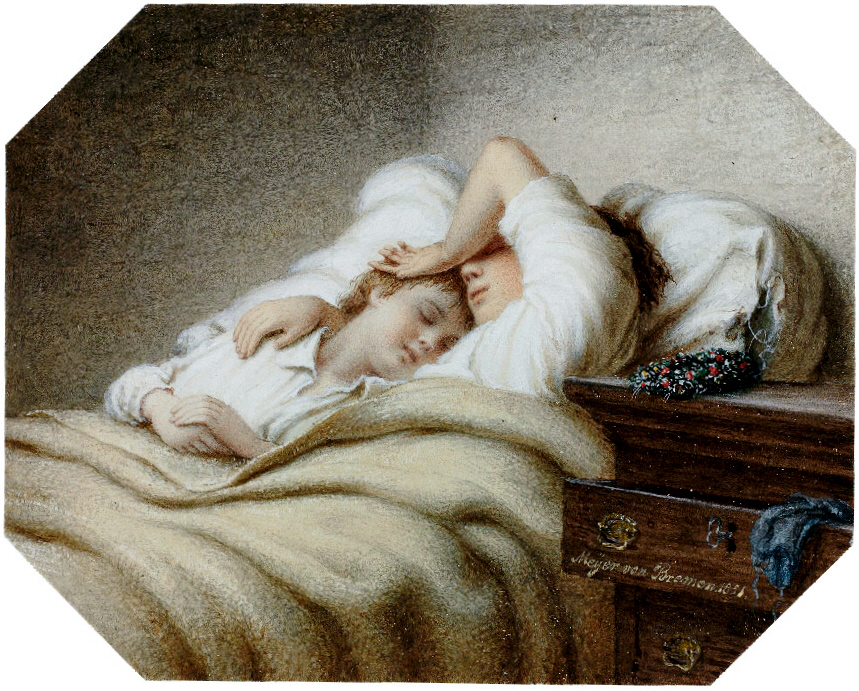
‘Schlafendes Geschwisterpaar’ (Sleeping sisters; 1851)

In his 21st year, he went to Düsseldorf and began his studies at the Academy of Art there, which was led by Friedrich Wilhelm Schadow, the son of sculptor Johann Gottfried Schadow. He is associated with the Düsseldorf school of painting. In 1841, Meyer opened a studio of his own, but moved to Berlin as his fame increased (1853). While scenes from the Bible were first the subjects of his brush, he later turned his attention to incidents from popular life, especially among the Hessian peasantry, and finally to the portrayal of family life in its pathetic aspect. Such pictures as ‘The Jubilee of a Hessian Pastor’ (1843), ‘Christmas Eve,’ ‘Blindman's Buff,’ ‘The Soldier's Return,’ ‘The Inundation’ (1846), ‘The Repentant Daughter’ (1852, in the gallery at Bremen), are full of intense sympathy with the “simple annals of the poor.” After taking up his residence at Berlin, he chose especially scenes from child life, which he rendered with spirited humor. Among his pictures of this kind are: 'The Little Flower Girl(1853)', ‘The Fairy Tale,’ ‘Children Playing Blindman's Buff,’ ‘Grandfather and Grandchild,’ and others. A third group of his pictures includes those of young women, as single figures or in groups, such as ‘The Tryst’ and ‘The Love Letter.’ An example of his work, ‘The Letter’ (1873), is in the Metropolitan Museum of Art in New York City.
