= Albert Flamm =

German painter

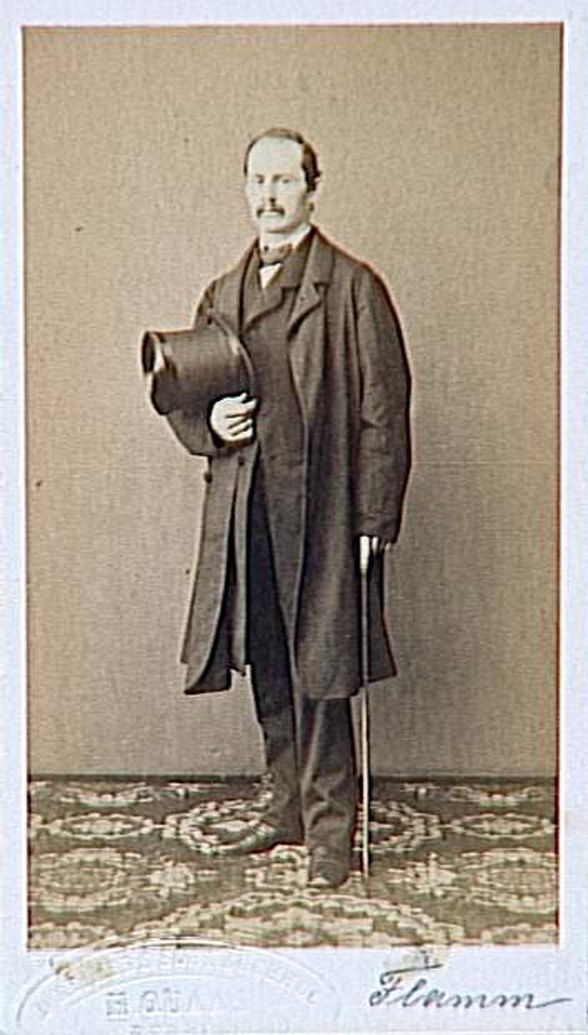
- Albert Flamm; photograph by Arnold Overbeck
- Born: 9 April 1823; Cologne
- Died: 28 March 1906 (aged 82); Düsseldorf
- Spouse: Anna Arnz
- Children: Carl Flamm

Albert Flamm (1823–1906) was a German landscape painter.

== Biography ==
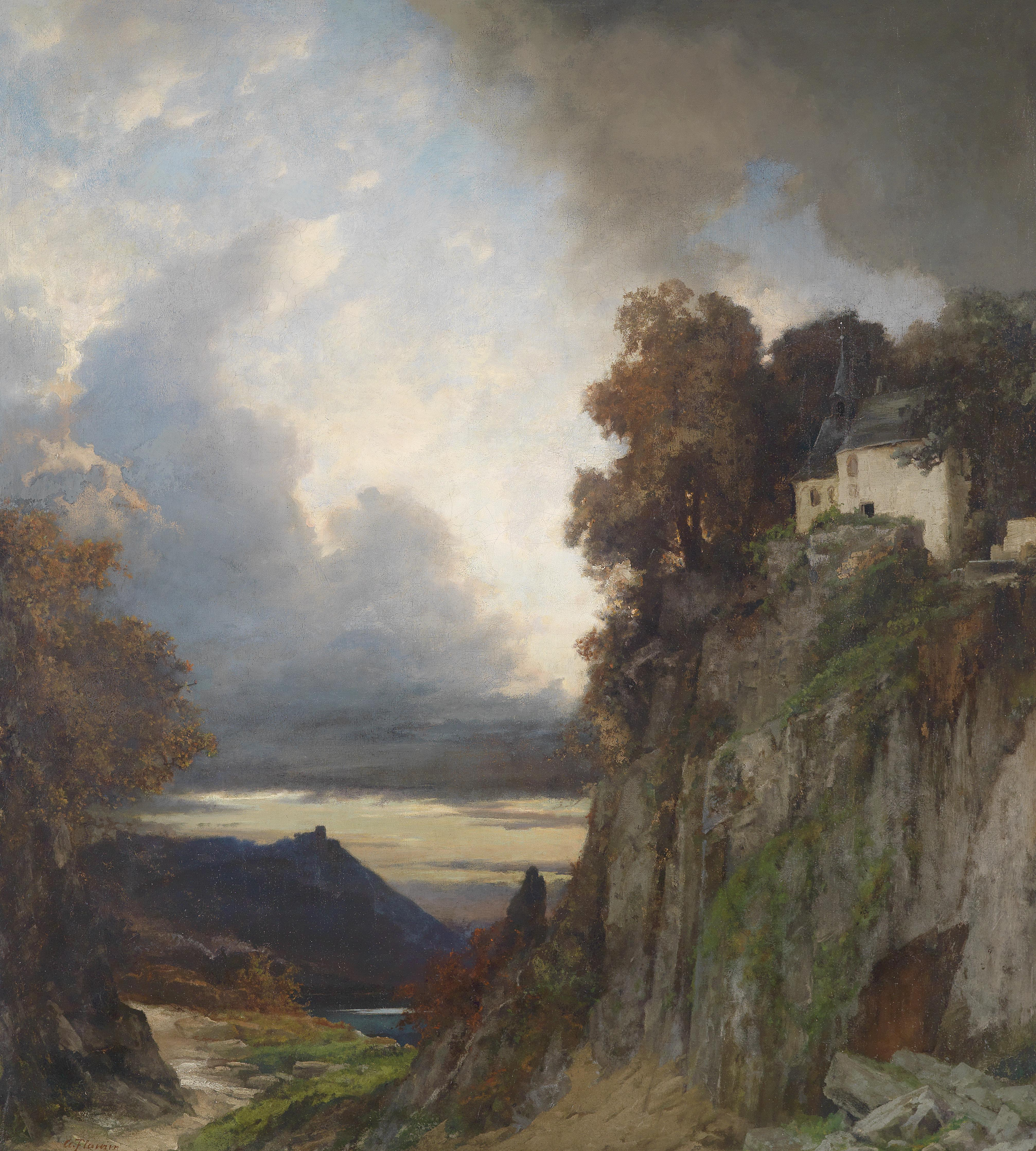
Evening Mood on the Rhine

Albert Flamm was born at Cologne. He was a pupil of Andreas Achenbach at the Kunstakademie Düsseldorf, where he settled after traveling in Italy. He is associated with the Düsseldorf school of painting. His pictures, the subjects of which were chosen almost exclusively from Italian scenery, command attention by their truthfulness to nature, careful execution, and bright and varied effects of color.

One of his best productions is the "Approaching Storm in the Campagna" (1862). Among others may be mentioned "Via Appia", in the Kunsthalle at Hamburg, a fine "Italian Landscape" (1856), in the Ravené Gallery, Berlin, and "View of Cumæ" (1881), in the National Gallery in Berlin. In 1900 the title of professor was conferred upon him.

== See also ==
- List of German painters
