= Ludolph Berkemeier =

Dutch painter

Ludolph Georg Julius Berkemeier
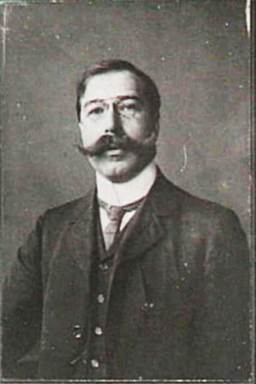
- Ludolph Berkemeier (c.1895/1900)
- Born: 20 August 1864; Tilburg, Netherlands
- Died: 18 July 1930 (aged 65); Noordwijk, Netherlands
- Education: Kunstakademie Düsseldorf, Weimar Saxon Grand Ducal Art School
- Known for: Landscape painting, cityscapes
- Movement: Düsseldorfer Malerschule, Hague School

Ludolph Georg Julius Berkemeier (20 August 1864, Tilburg – 18 July 1930, Noordwijk) was a Dutch landscape and cityscape painter; associated with the Düsseldorfer Malerschule and the Hague School.

== Biography ==
For two years, he attended the Kunstakademie Düsseldorf, where he studied landscape painting with Eugen Dücker. While there, he came under the influence of the newly emerging Barbizon school. Upon graduating, he took a study trip to Wiesbaden.

He continued his studies at the Weimar Saxon Grand Ducal Art School, where he worked with Theodor Hagen, an early German Impressionist. Despite briefly working in that style, after he returned to the Netherlands he was more attracted to the Hague school, which was heavily influenced by the Realism of the Barbizons. He eventually settled in Baambrugge.

In 1896, he suddenly decided to move to Noordwijk, where he established a studio and sold painting supplies. Later, he was able to qualify for a government pension. He continued to develop his style by taking lessons in plein air painting from Jan Hillebrand Wijsmuller, who was an occasional visitor to the area, and collaborated with him on several works.

Many of his landscape paintings incorporate genre elements. He also created numerous still-lifes and book illustrations. For many years, he was an active member of Arti et Amicitiae. A small street in Noordwijk has been named after him.

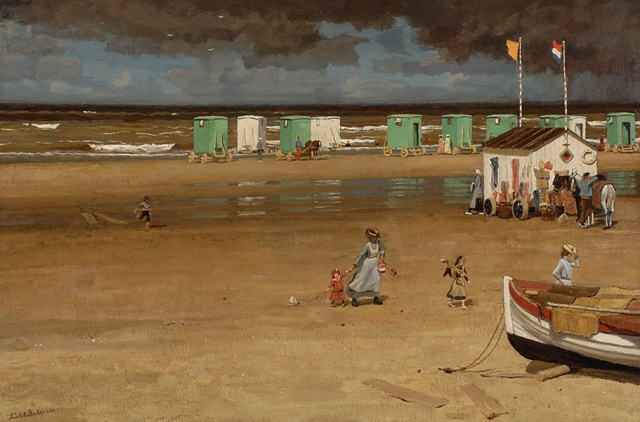
Figures on the Beach at Noordwijk
