= Hermann Fuechsel =

German-American landscape painter and member of the Hudson River School

Hermann Traugott Louis Fuechsel, also known as Füchsel or Fuchsel (August 8, 1833 – September 30, 1915), was a German-American landscape painter, and member of the Düsseldorf school and Hudson River School.

== Life and work ==
Hermann Fuechsel was born in Braunschweig, Germany, in 1833. He met American painters Albert Bierstadt and Worthington Whittredge while studying at the Düsseldorf Academy under Hans Heinrich Jürgen Brandes. He was also a pupil of Karl Friedrich Lessig. Upon his move to the United States in 1858, he opened a studio in Appleton's building on Broadway. From 1882 to 1915, he would work from the Tenth Street Studio Building in New York, the building used by many Hudson River school painters such as Sanford Robinson Gifford. Fuechsel was originally trained as an engraver, which in some paintings shows in his narrow range of color and crisp draftsmanship. He was a member of the Artist's Fund Society.

His works are held in the collections of the New-York Historical Society museum, Hudson River Museum and the Williams College Museum of Art. His paintings have also been exhibited at SUNY New Paltz. During his career, Fuechsel painted various landscapes of New York including the Hudson Valley, Lake George, the Adirondacks, and Kaaterskill Falls; but also the Rocky Mountains.

Fuechsel died at the Isabella Heimath in New York City on September 30, 1915.

== Selected paintings ==
Keene Valley, Adirondacks, 1876 (Williams College Museum of Art, Williamstown, Massachusetts)

Hudson River Scene, 1875 (Hudson River Museum, Yonkers, New York)

View of New York on the Bay from Staten Island, 1871 (New-York Historical Society Museum & Library, New York, New York)

== Literature ==
- George C. Groce, David H. Wallace: The New-York Historical Society’s Dictionary of Artists in America 1564–1860. New Haven, CT: Yale University Press, 1957. P. 245.
- Emmanuel Bénézit: Dictionnaire critique et documentaire des peintres, sculpteurs, dessinateurs et graveurs de tous les temps et de tous les pays. Paris: Gründ, 1976. Vol. IV, p. 550.
