= Erik Bodom =

Norwegian artist (1829–1879)

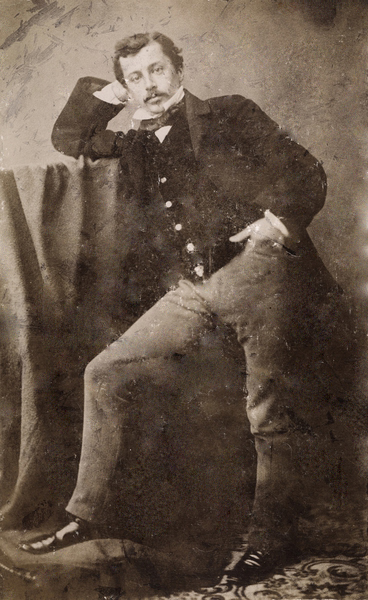
Erik Bodom, c. 1870

Erik Bodom (September 28, 1829 – 16 April 1879) was a Norwegian landscape painter.

== Biography ==
Erik Bodom was born in Vestby in Akershus, Norway. He was a pupil at the Oslo Cathedral School, but shortly left school to educate himself as a painter. He attended the Royal Drawing School, studying under Johannes Flintoe during 1847. He was a student of Hans Gude during 1848. In 1850, he traveled to Düsseldorf, where he made rapid progress. In 1852, he sold a landscape painting Aus dem Bondhusthal (From the Bondhusdalen), to Bridgewater Gallery in London. The following year, he became an honorary member of the Royal Academy in Amsterdam.

Bodom developed a distinctly romanticized form of landscape painting. He painted in a style similar to that associated with August Cappelen, who was noted for his melancholic and romantic landscape paintings. Bodom often featured scenes from the coniferous forests of Eastern Norway. The composition of such images frequently featured landscapes of forested hills and quiet ponds, often with a bewitching atmosphere using strong contrasts between light and dark.

In 1862, Bodom established a permanent residence in Germany, That same year he visited Norway for the last time. He died in Düsseldorf. The National Museum of Art, Architecture and Design is the owner of several pieces of his art including Fra Nordmarken (1857), Havneparti (1865), and Kystparti med bauta og vrak (1878).

== Gallery ==
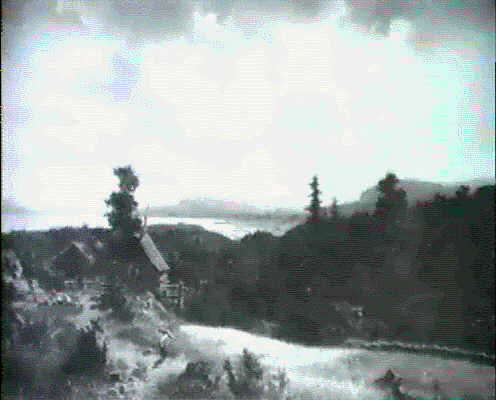
Norwegische Sommerlandschaft (1854)

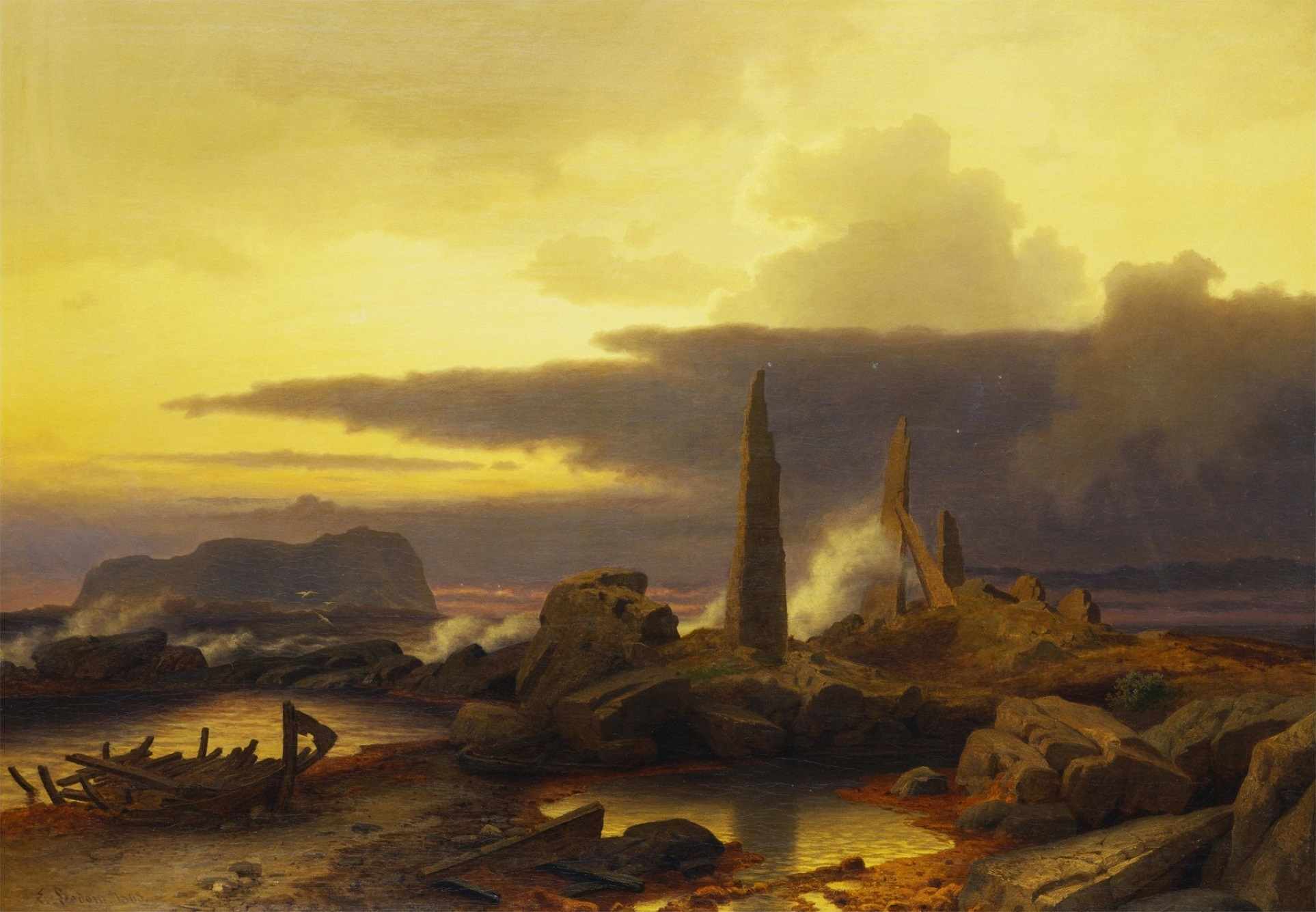
Minnesteiner (1868)

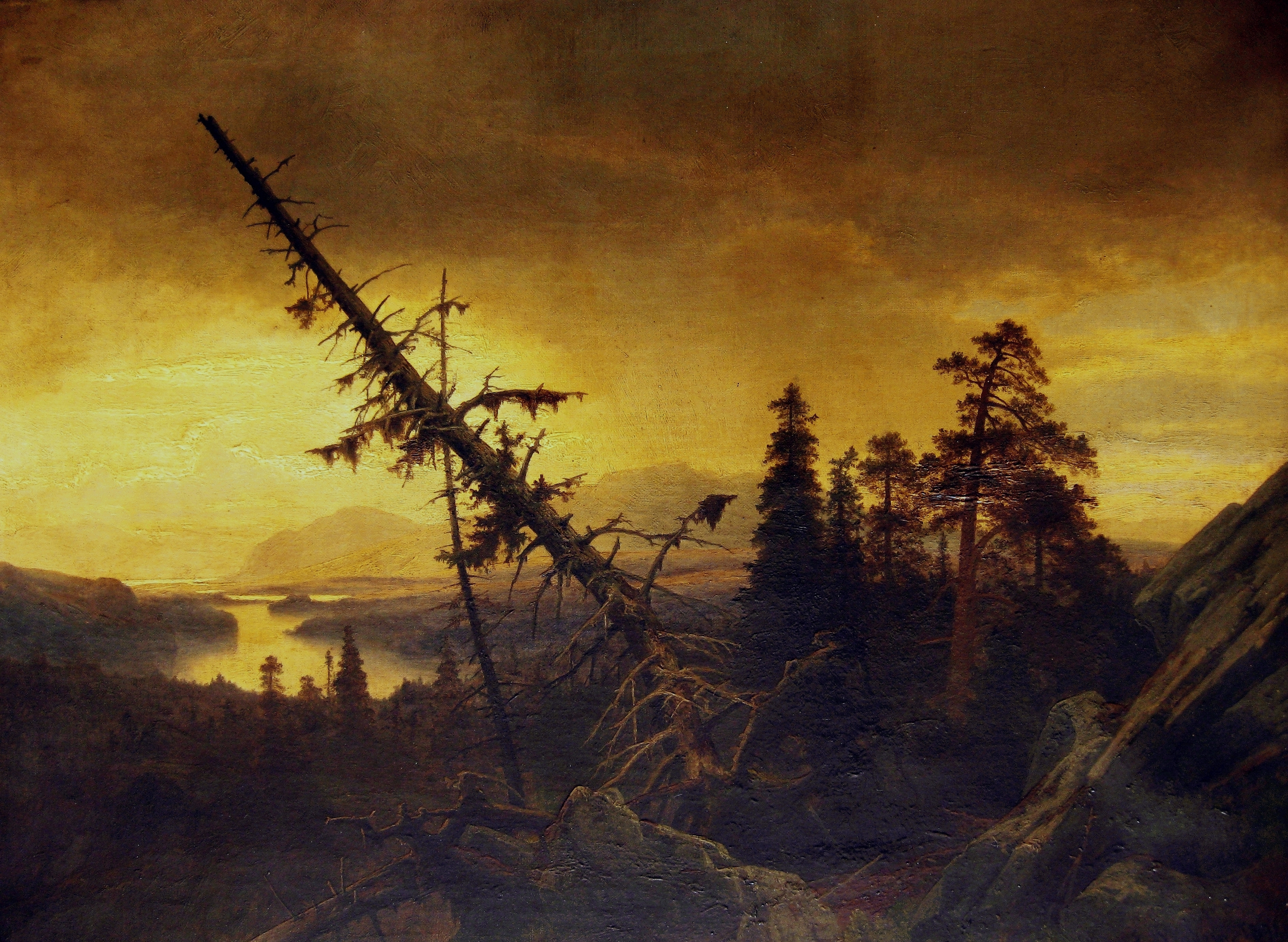
Ruhe nach dem Sturm (1871)

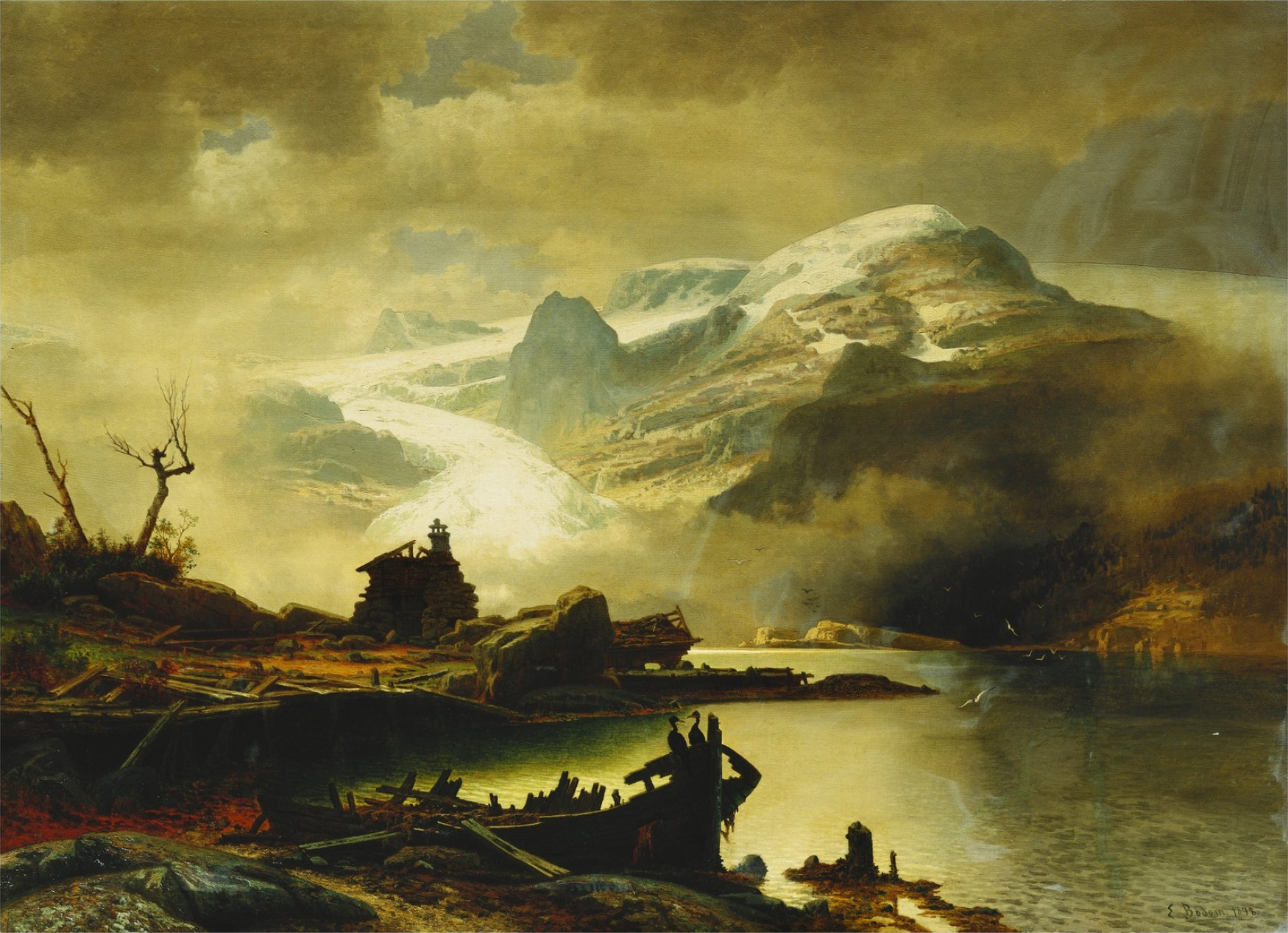
Bondhusbreen i Sunnhordland (1878)

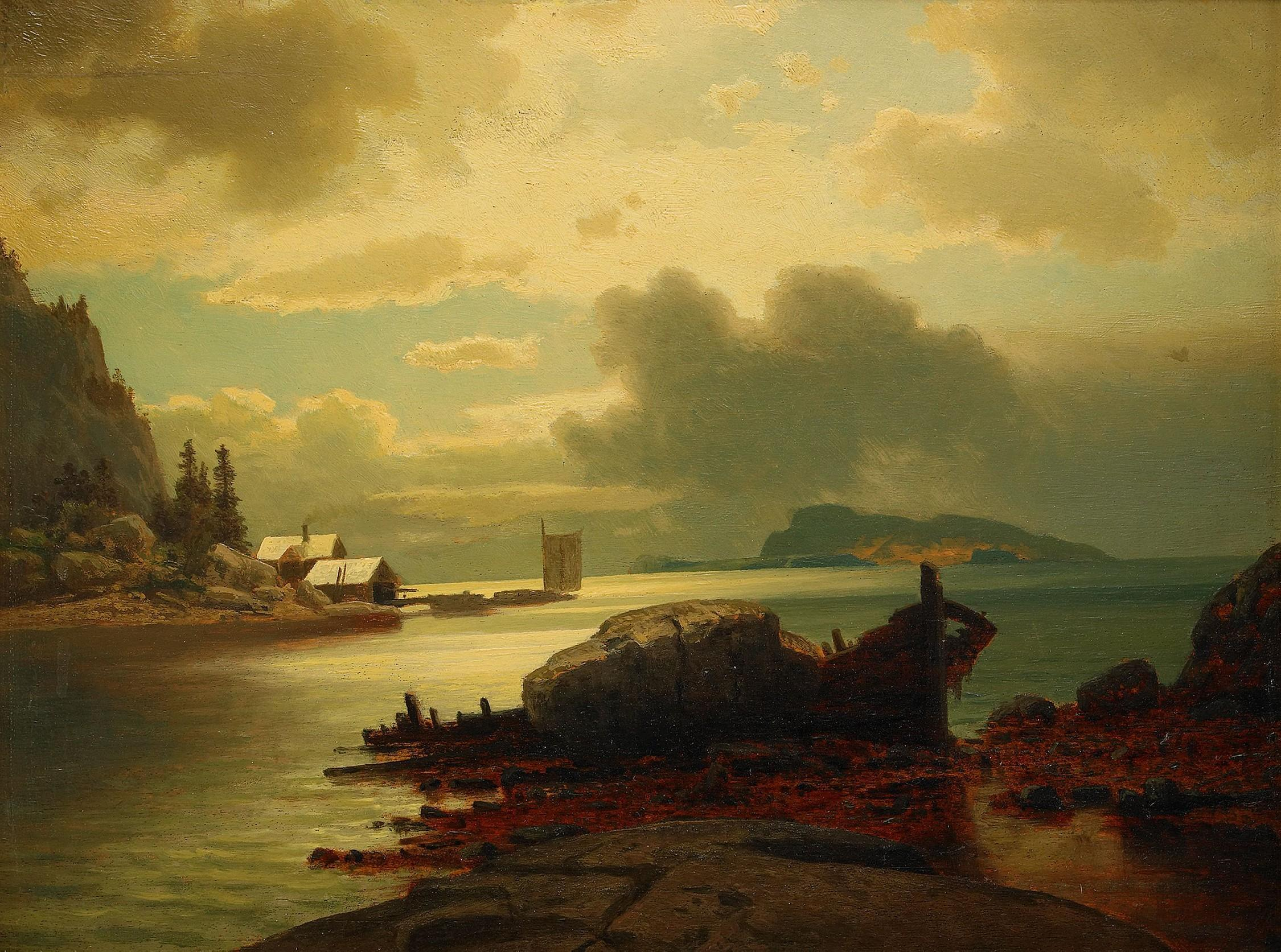
Norska kustlandskap 2nd (1878)

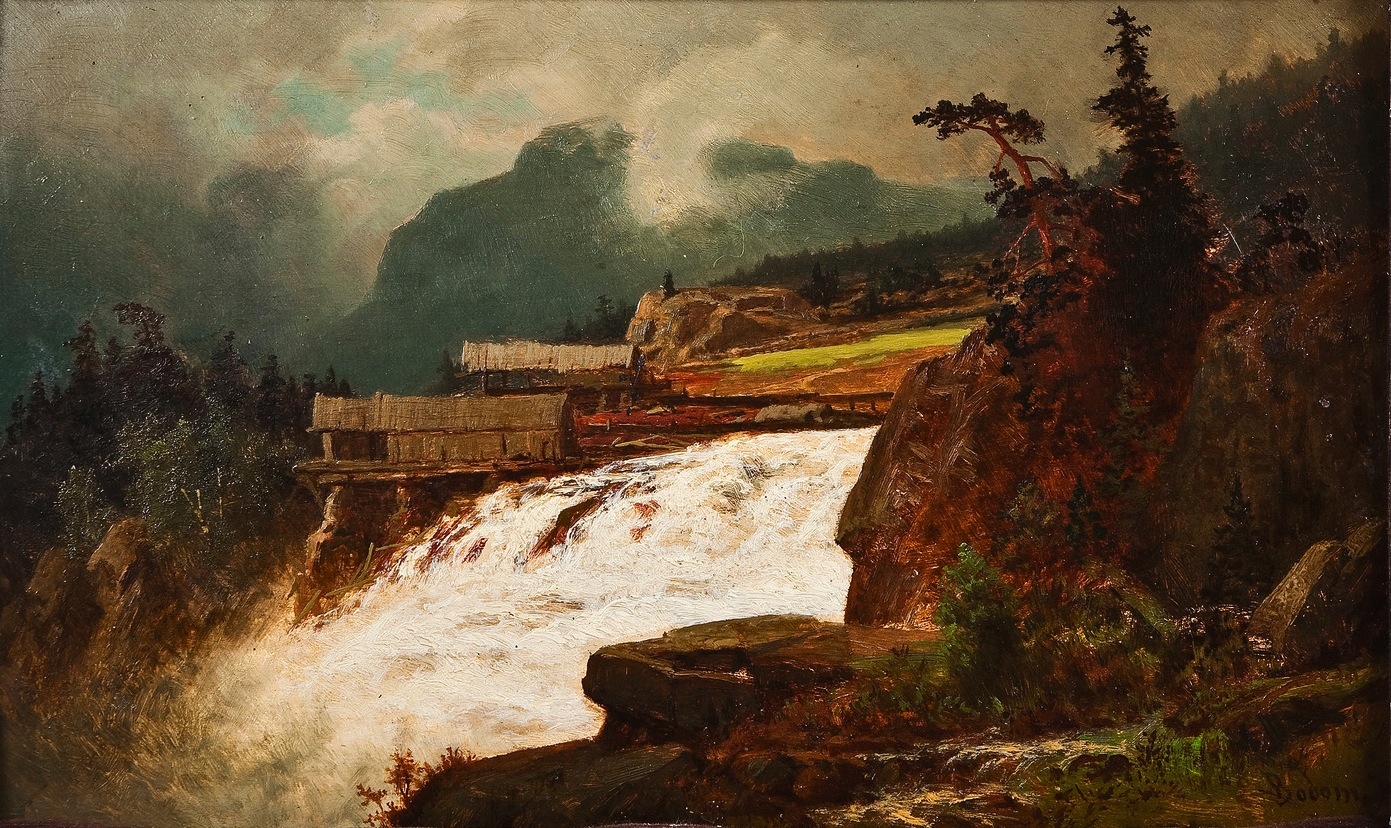
Foss med sagbruk (1878)

== Notes ==
Sources differ regarding the date of his death. Monroe (1908) and Hannover (1922), among others, give 1879, but Muther (1896) gives 1873 and the Meyers Konversations-Lexikon 4th ed. (1890) gives April 18, 1880.

== Other sources ==
- "Bodom". Meyers Konversations-Lexikon (in German). Vol. 3 (4th ed.). 1890. p. 121.
- Hannover, Emil (1922). Scandinavian Art: Illustrated. The American-Scandinavian Foundation. p. 472.
- Monroe, W. S. (1908). In Viking Land: Norway: Its Peoples, Its Fjords and Its Fjelds. L. C. Page & Co.; Digital edition by Internet Archive. pp. 300.
- Muther, Richard (1896). The History of Modern Painting (vol. 2). Vol. 2. trans. Ernest Dowson, George Greene, & Arthur Hillier. pp. 325, 806.
