= Arnold Forstmann =

German painter

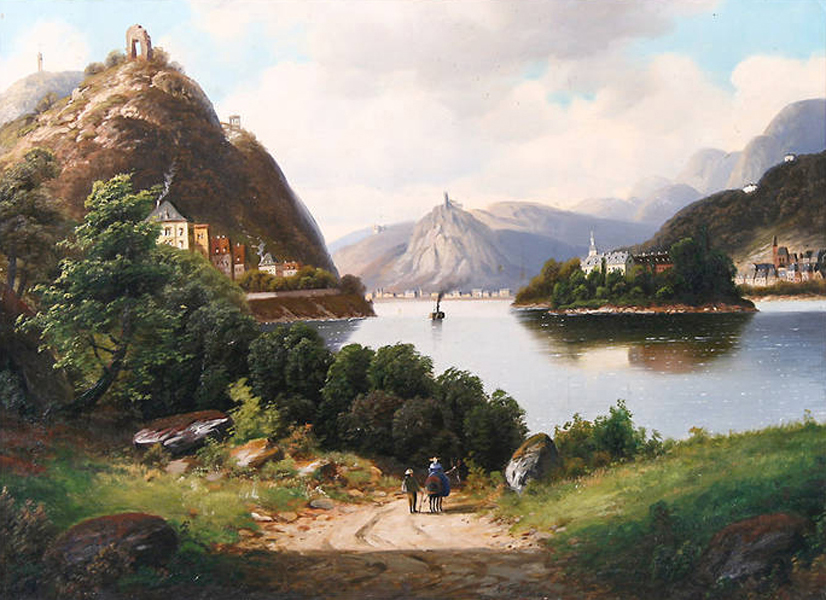
Arnold Forstmann: Nonnenwerth, Rolandseck and Drachenfels (on the Rhine)

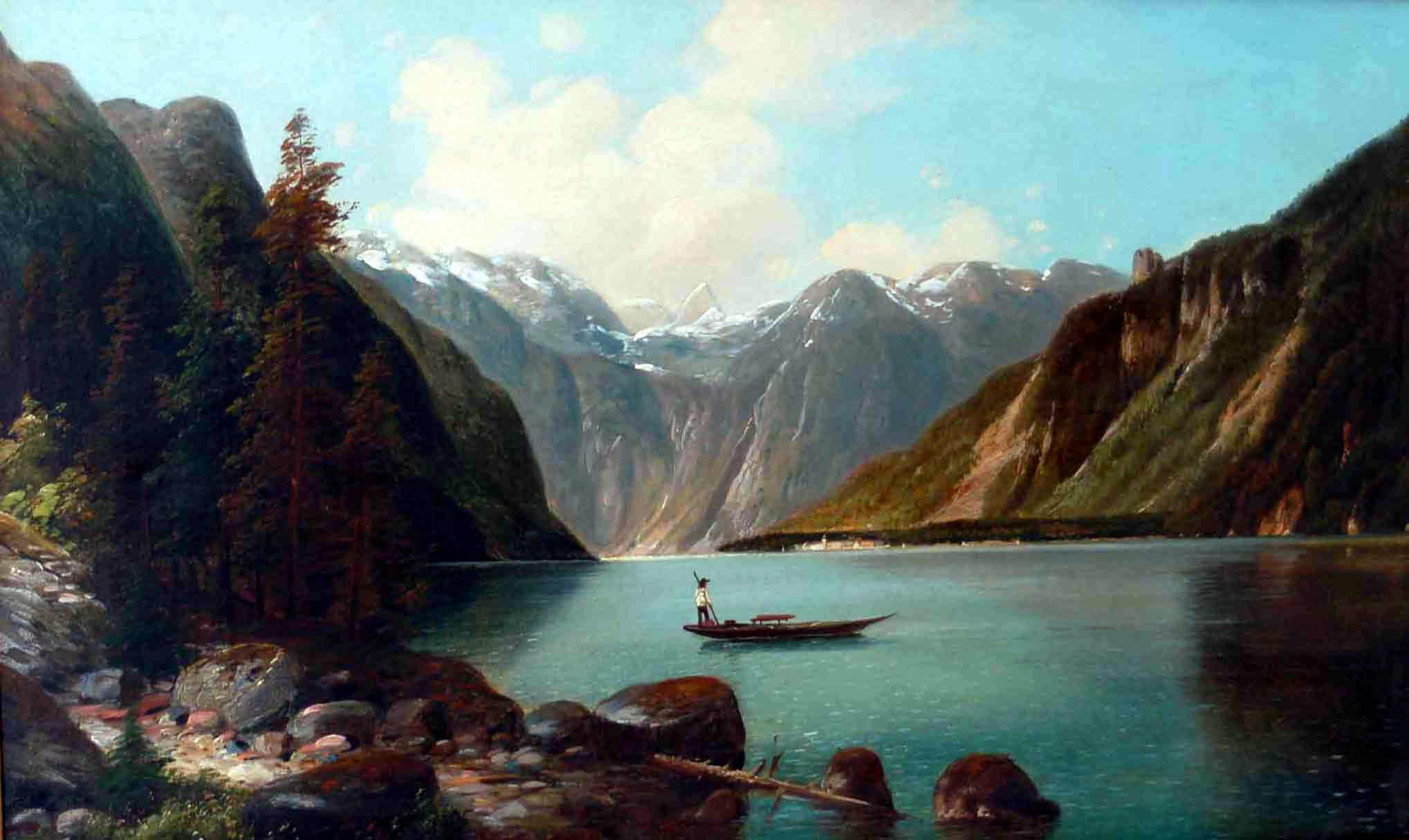
Arnold Forstmann: Königssee, c. 1880

Arnold Forstmann (born 16 June 1842 in Düsseldorf; died 1914 or later), German landscape-painter. Besides the typical composed romantic landscapes in the tradition of the Düsseldorf school of painting Forstmann painted vedute of the Rhine Valley and the Alps.

== Life ==
Arnold Forstmann entered the Düsseldorf Academy in the third quarter of 1867. He started his artistic education in a class of landscape-painters directed by Oswald Achenbach (1827–1905) until 1871. In February 1872 he left the art academy; his last teacher was Albert Flamm (1823–1906). In the list of students of the art academy Forstmann was remarked as deaf-mute. After his education Arnold Forstmann lived in Düsseldorf as a landscape-painter. In the year 1904 he moved from Düsseldorf to Köln. The date of the death of Arnold Forstmann is not known so far. The last record of his life is taken from a genre-portrait "In devotion", dated 1914.

== Achievement ==
Typically, Arnold Forstmann's paintings are all very detailed. The basic composition (frequently medial section, rarely central view) is supported by the use of strong contrasts and a reduced palette which is mostly tuned on one basic tone. In the late-romantic painting tradition Forstmann frequently uses figures in the typical rear view position.

In the composed landscapes elements like mountains, single houses or huts, rivers or lakes are always present. The surface of the water is animated with small boats loaded with persons, one or more sailing vessel and sometimes a steamer far away.

Even Forstmann's vedute are no exact copies of the real landscapes. As a rule, Forstmann varies the dimensions of selected elements of landscape in order to intensify the artistic expression. But these variations will never destroy the original impression of the real landscape (compare for example the painting of the Königssee). Apart from landscape-paintings, some single hunting-paintings, still life paintings and one genre-portrait are known.

The signature "A. Forstmann", which never was altered, appears in two different writing variants. It is very likely that the signature version A is older than the signature version B. This fact can probably be used when the approximate period of the creation of a painting are estimated.

With some exceptions, the paintings of Arnold Forstmann are not dated. Known dated paintings are: Lake in the alps (Alpensee) from 1869, Oberwesel at the Rhine river (Oberwesel am Rhein) from 1883, Summerday in Altenahr (Sommertag in Altenahr) from 1904, Southern Marina (Südländische Marine) from 1905 (Köln), In Devotion (In Andacht) from 1914.

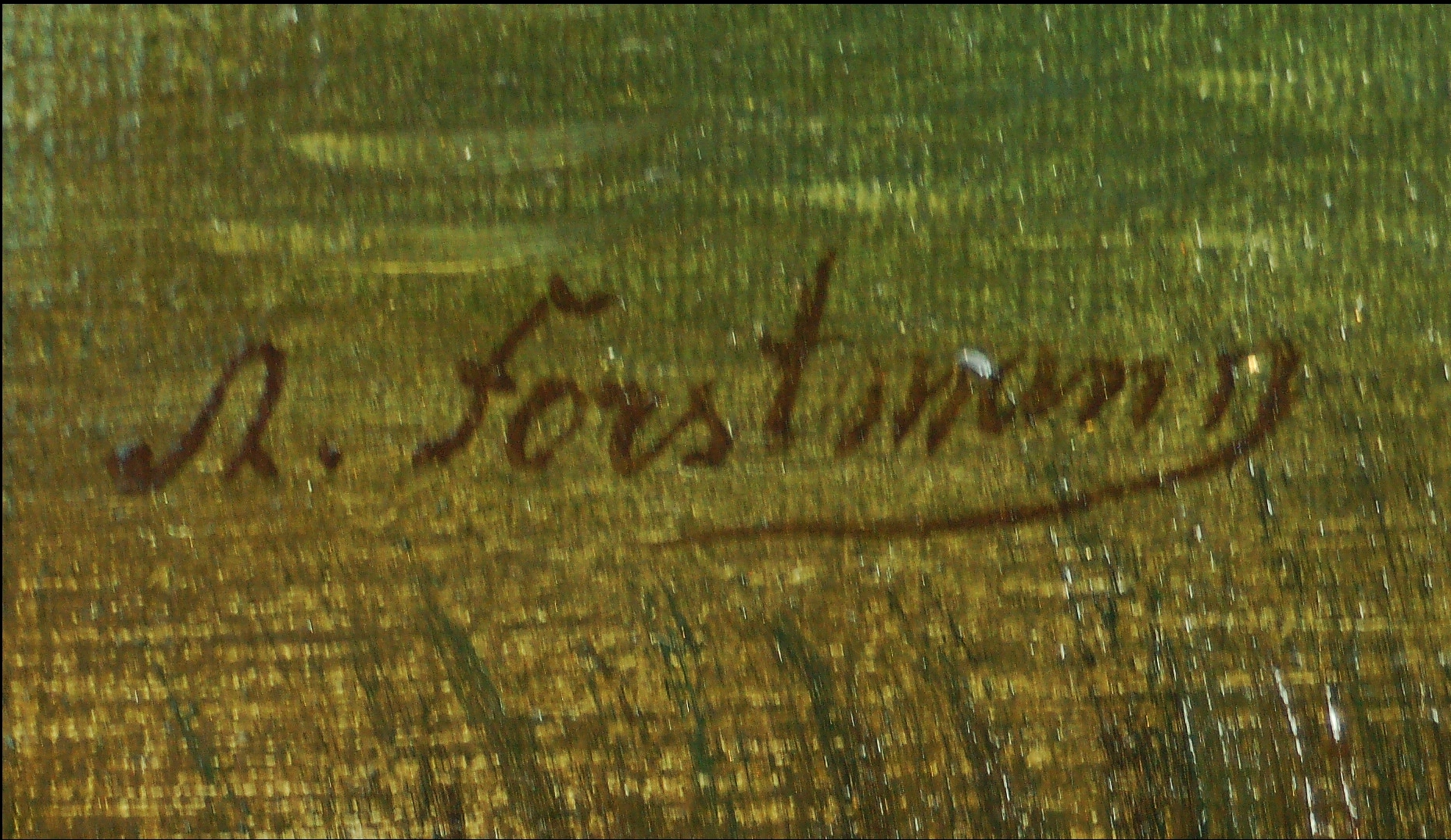
signature version A

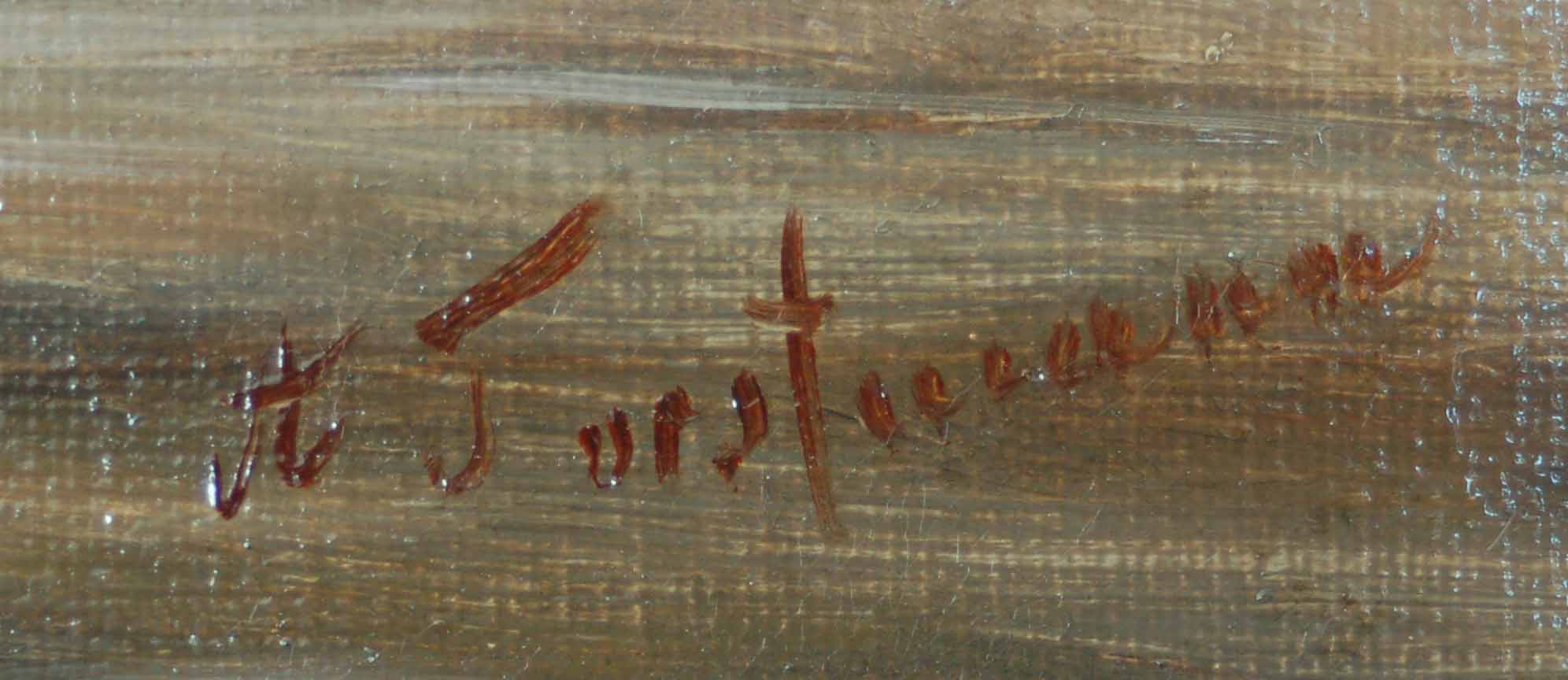
signature version B

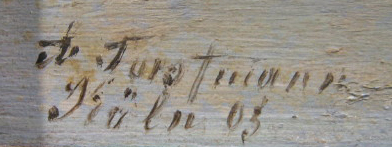
signature, dated 1905

== Artwork ==
The vedute of the Rhine river valley (Rolandseck, Nonnenwerth and Drachenfels, Stolzenfels Castel) and of the Alps (Chiemsee, Königssee) are well known and there are many of landscapes. Some dealing with the so-called "wild romantic" genre, showing wild mountain-streams bordered by watermills and crossed by staggering bridges. These scenes are frequently lighted by a full moon that is partially covered by clouds. Moonlight is also the favourite illumination for Forstmann's fishermen-scenes. On the other hand, Forstmann painted peaceful daylight scenes showing sunny alp-meadows with a brooklet or mountain lakes, animated by small boats or sailing vessels. Furthermore, Forstmann painted fjords and marinas.

As a common practice within the painters of the 19th century Forstmann painted his successful subjects more than once. There are up to 4 copies of a composition known. But every "copy" shows variations. Sometimes Forstmann only changes the size of the painting, or he mirrors the image or he alters the light (daylight/moonlight) or the season, sometimes he changes only some details.

== Paintings in public exhibitions ==
- Rolandseck, Nonnenwerth und Drachenfels, Öl/Leinwand, um 1870 (Bonn, Stadtmuseum)

== See also ==
- List of German painters

== Bibliography ==
- Wend von Kalnein (Ed.): Die Düsseldorfer Malerschule. Verlag Philipp von Zabern, Düsseldorf/Darmstadt/Mainz 1978, ISBN 978-3-8053-0409-2
- Haupt-Staatsarchiv Düsseldorf: Schülerlisten der Kunstakadenmie Düsseldorf
- Carsten Roth: Arnold Forstmann. In: Allgemeines Künstler Lexikon Band 42. K.G. Saur Verlag, München Leipzig 2004, S. 459
