= Ascan Lutteroth =

German painter

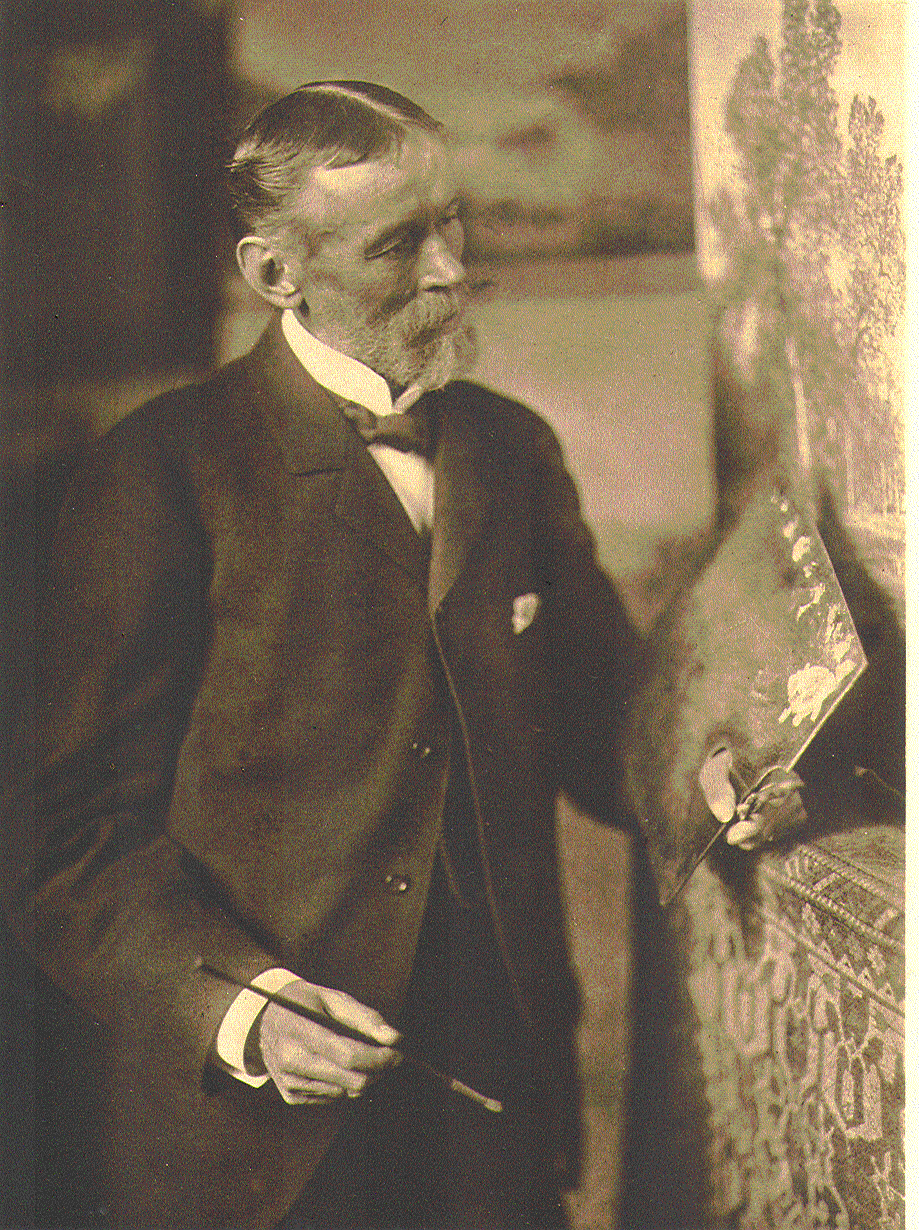
Ascan Lutteroth; photograph by Rudolf Dührkoop (1905)

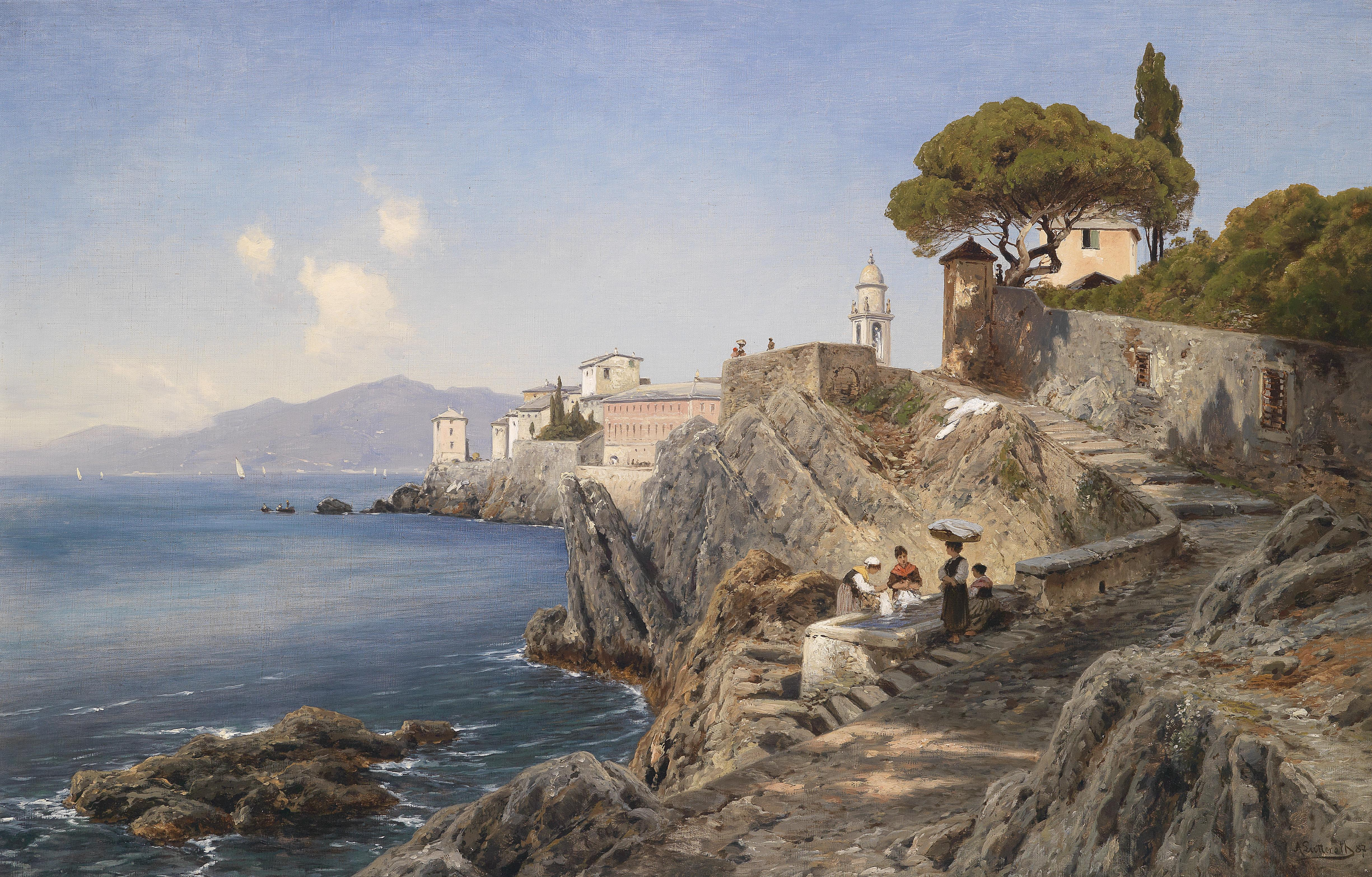
On the Shore at Sturla

Ascan Lutteroth (5 October 1842 – 2 February 1923) was a German landscape painter; associated with the Düsseldorfer Malerschule.

== Biography ==
He was born in Hamburg. His grandfather, Ascan Wilhelm Lutteroth, was a merchant and served in the Hamburg Parliament as a Senator.. His father, Christian Alexander Ascan Lutteroth (1812–1867), was a prominent banker. From 1861, he studied with Alexandre Calame in Geneva then, from 1864 to 1867, with Oswald Achenbach at the Kunstakademie Düsseldorf.

He lived in Italy from 1868 to 1870, mostly on Capri, then moved to Berlin. In 1872, he married Elisabeth Warnecke (1851–1932), the daughter of Johann Conrad Warnecke, a merchant and politician like his grandfather. He returned to Hamburg in 1877, where he was awarded a commission to paint three large pictures for the Town Hall.

In 1879, Lutteroth paid a lengthy visit to San Remo. While there, he served as a tutor for Crown Princess Victoria, who was an amateur painter. Most of his best known earlier landscapes are of Italy.

In 1890, Kaiser Wilhelm II named Lutteroth a Professor. After that, he confined his painting to the area around Hamburg. Until 1909, he was Chairman of the Hamburger Künstlerverein.

He was represented at numerous international exhibitions. His works were acquired by the National Gallery (Berlin) and the Rudolfinum in Prague, but are not currently on display; placed in storage in favor of more modern works. They may still be seen at the Kunsthalle Hamburg and the Museumsberg Flensburg, among other smaller venues. In 2019, his works were part of an exhibit at the Kunsthalle: Hamburger Schule – Das 19. Jahrhundert neu entdeckt (The 19th Century rediscovered).

Lutteroth died in 1923 in Hamburg and is interred at his family's gravesite at the Ohlsdorfer Friedhof.

== Sources ==
- Lutteroth, Ascan. In: Friedrich von Boetticher: Malerwerke des neunzehnten Jahrhunderts. Beitrag zur Kunstgeschichte. Vol.I, Dresden 1895, pgs.907 ff.
- Tilman Osterwold: Der Hamburger Maler Ascan Lutteroth. Dissertation, Innsbruck 1969
- Karoline Müller/Friedrich Rothe (Eds.): Victoria von Preußen 1840-1901 in Berlin 2001. Verein der Berliner Künstlerinnen 1867 e.V., Berlin 2001, pg.252 ISBN 978-3-9802288-9-3
- Hans F. Schweers: Gemälde in deutschen Museen. Katalog der ausgestellten und depotgelagerten Werke. 7 Bde., München 2005, ISBN 3-598-24166-6.
- Tilman Osterwold (1987). "Ascan Lutteroth". Neue Deutsche Biographie (in German). Vol. 15. Berlin: Duncker & Humblot. pp. 565–565. (full text online).
- Lutteroth, Ascan. In: Hermann Alexander Müller: Biographisches Künstler-Lexikon. Verlag des Bibliographischen Instituts, Leipzig 1882, pgs.344 f.
