= Carl Seibels =

German painter

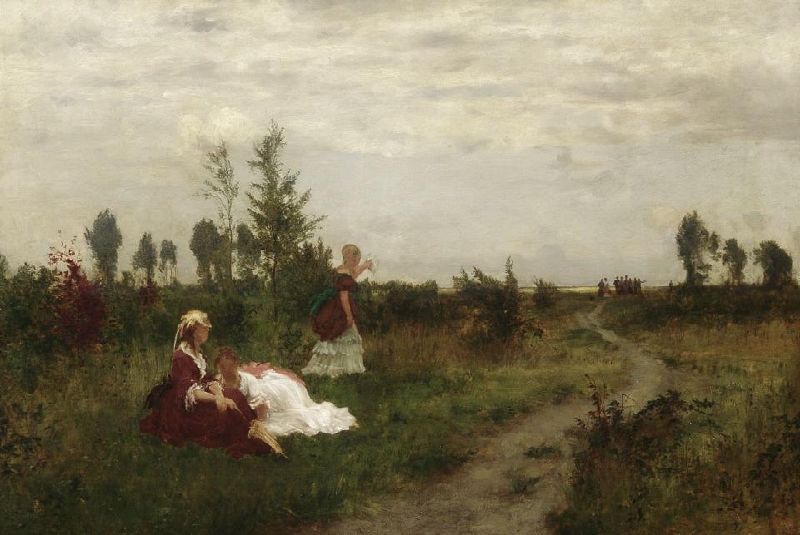
Heathland, with Women Resting

Carl Seibels (1844, Cologne – July 1877, Capri or Naples) was a German painter in the Biedermeier style.

== Biography ==
He served an apprenticeship for a career in business and initially worked as a roll engraver. At the age of seventeen, he began studying art at the Kunstakademie Düsseldorf and, in 1863, entered the landscape painting class taught by Oswald Achenbach. In 1867, he and Theodor Hagen took a trip to Paris, learned plein aire painting techniques from the artists of the Barbizon school, especially Constant Troyon, and promoted that style in Germany.

From 1869 to 1875, he was a member of Malkasten (paintbox), a progressive artists' association. Already ill by 1874, he paid frequent visits to his friends Gregor von Bochmann and Anton Mauve, as he thought coastal areas would be better for his health. Later, he would seek warmer climates, and died in Italy.

Although his output was not very substantial, his works may be seen at the National Gallery (Berlin), the Kunsthalle Hamburg, Museum Kunstpalast, Kunsthalle Bremen, Museum Folkwang, Wallraf-Richartz-Museum and the Von der Heydt-Museum.

== Sources/Further reading ==
- Bernd Lasch: Landschaften von Karl Seibels. Düsseldorf : J. Schwann 1925
- Hans F. Schweers: Gemälde in Museen. Deutschland, Österreich, Schweiz: Katalog der ausgestellten und depotgelagerten Werke. Saur, 2008, ISBN 978-3-598-24250-2, pg.1409.
- Hans Paffrath (Ed.): Lexikon der Düsseldorfer Malerschule 1819–1918. Vol. 3: Nabert–Zwecker, Bruckmann, Munich 1998, ISBN 3-7654-3011-0, pg.273f
- Wend von Kalnein, (Ed.), Die Düsseldorfer Malerschule: Kunstmuseum Düsseldorf, 13. Mai – 8. Juli 1979; Mathildenhöhe Darmstadt, 22. Juli – 9. September 1979. von Zabern, Mainz 1979, ISBN 3-8053-0409-9, pg.439f.
