= Adolf Schrödter =

German painter and illustrator (1805–1875)

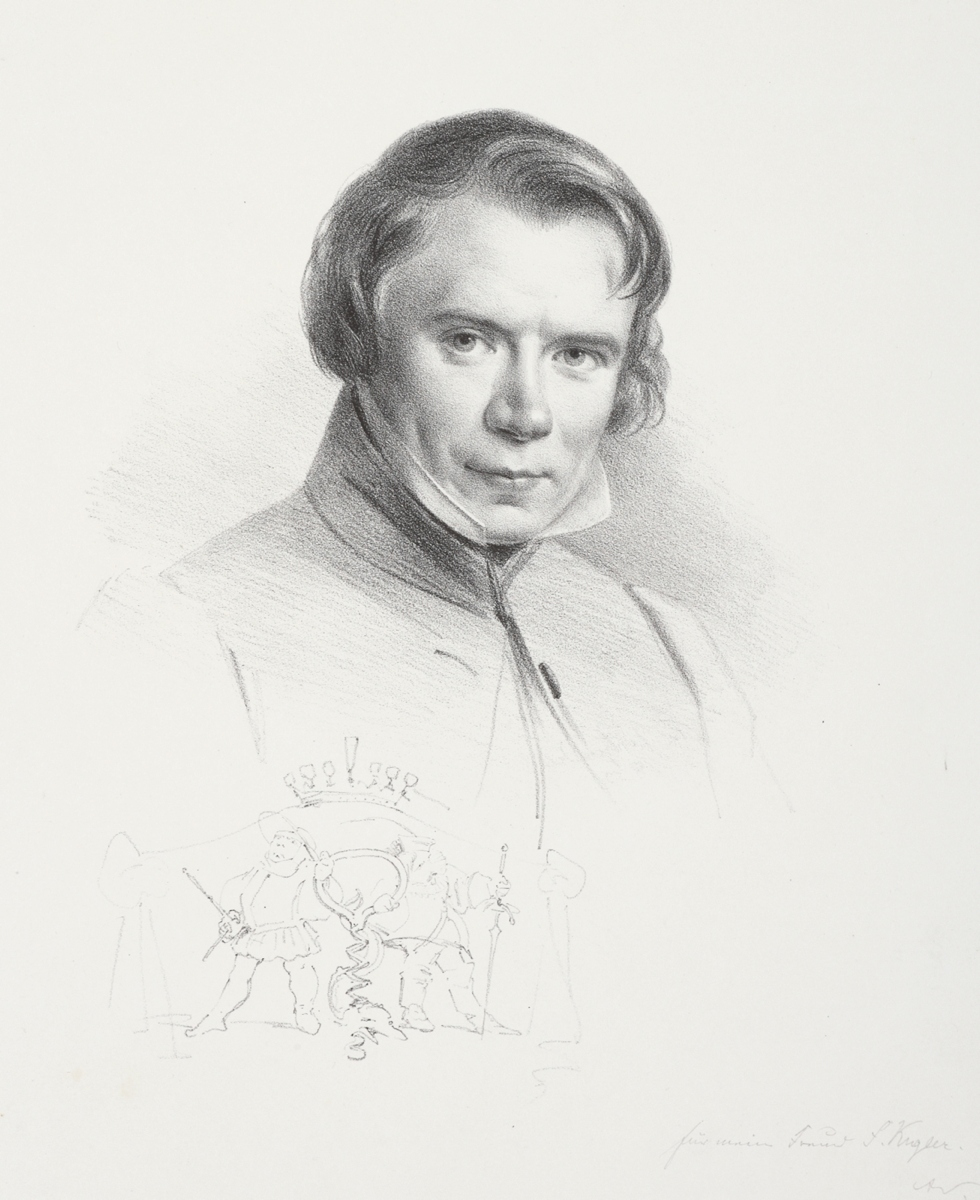
Self-portrait (1835)

Adolf Schrödter or Adolph Schroedter (28 June 1805 – 9 December 1875) was a German painter and graphic artist; associated with the Düsseldorf school of painting. He is considered to be one of the pioneers of German comics.

== Life and work ==
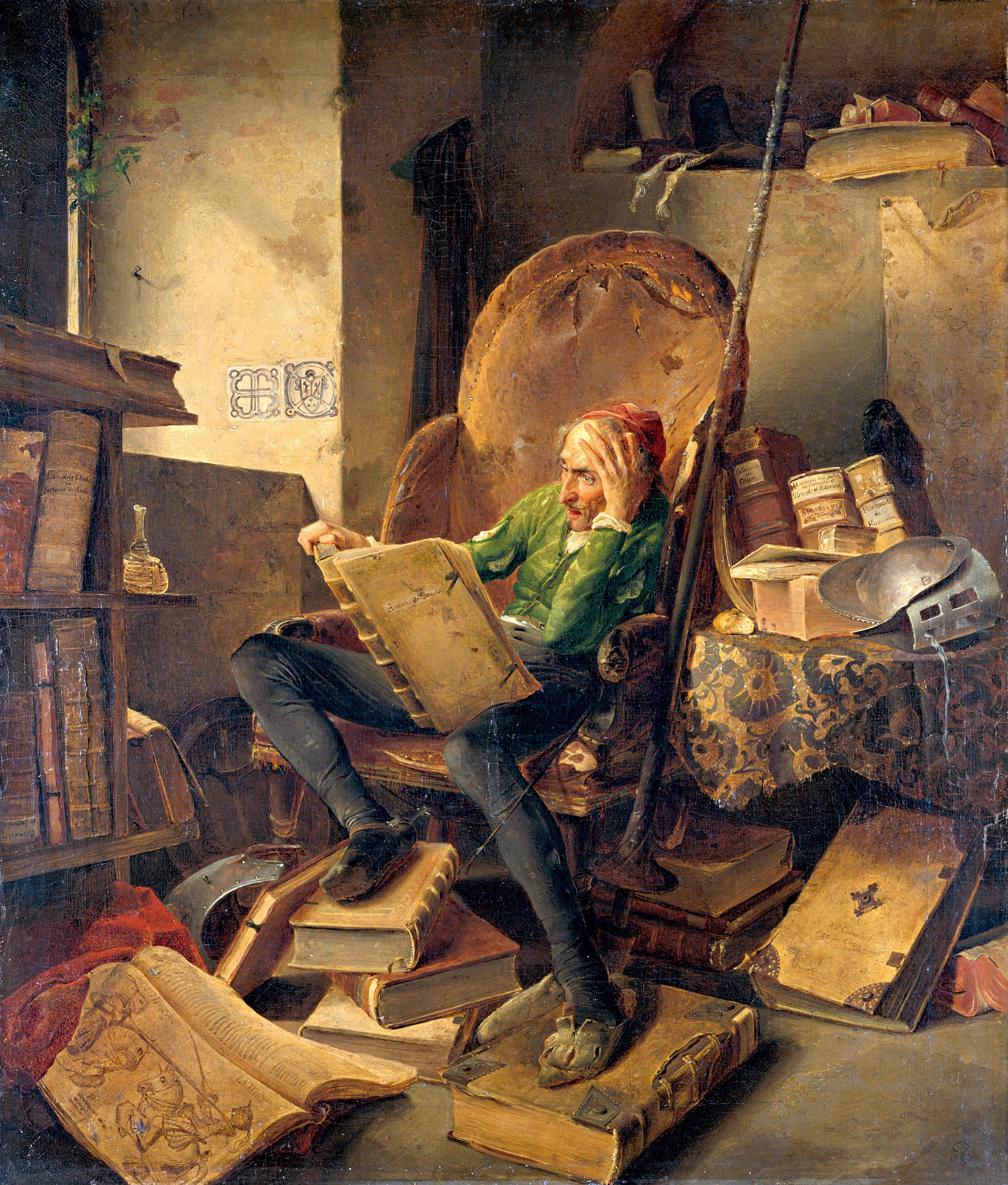
Don Quixote in the library; one of his most familiar works

He was born in Schwedt. His father was a copper engraver. In 1820, he studied engraving in Berlin, with the graphic artist Ludwig Buchhorn. By 1827, he had decided to devote himself to painting and studied at the Berlin Academy. In 1828, he went to Düsseldorf to work with Wilhelm von Schadow.

In 1840, he married Alwine Heuser, from Gummersbach, the daughter of a wealthy merchant and niece of the painter, Henriette Jügel. He encouraged her desires to pursue a career in art. They had two sons and two daughters. Their daughter Malwine married the painter Anton von Werner in 1871.

He began making regular contributions to the new satirical magazine, Düsseldorfer Monathefte in 1847. The following year, he became one of the first members of the progressive artists' association "Malkasten" (Paintbox). Shortly after, he and his family moved to Frankfurt am Main, where he worked on several parodies with the politician and writer, Johann Hermann Detmold.

In 1854, he and Alwine returned to Düsseldorf, to live in the former home of their friend, Johann Wilhelm Schirmer. who had moved to Karlsruhe. Their neighbors there were another artistic couple, Marie and Rudolf Wiegmann.

They moved again in 1859, to Karlsruhe, so he could accept a position as Professor of Ornamentation at the recently created Großherzoglich Badische Kunstschule Karlsruhe; where their friend from Düsseldorf, Schirmer, was serving as Director, and his sister-in-law Ida's husband, Karl Friedrich Lessing, was a Professor. He held that position until 1872. He died in Karlsruhe in 1875.

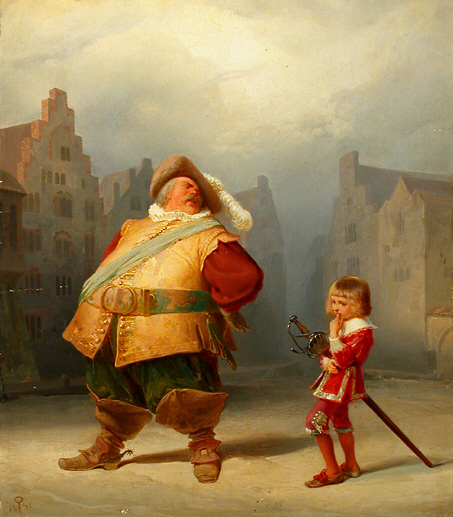
Falstaff and his Page

His works encompassed several types and styles: painting, illustrating, engraving, etching, woodcutting, and lithography, as well as creating ornaments. In addition to drawing cartoons for satires he also wrote them, and pursued botany as a hobby; becoming an amateur florist. His technical writings include Das Zeichnen als ästhetisches Bildungsmittel (Drawing as an aesthetic means of education, 1853) and Schule der Aquarellmalerei (School of watercolor painting, 1871).
