= Joseph Binder =

Joseph Binder may refer to:

- Joseph Binder (painter) (1805–1863), Austrian painter
- Joseph Binder (graphic designer) (1898–1972), Austrian graphic designer and painter
