= Adeline Jaeger =

German painter

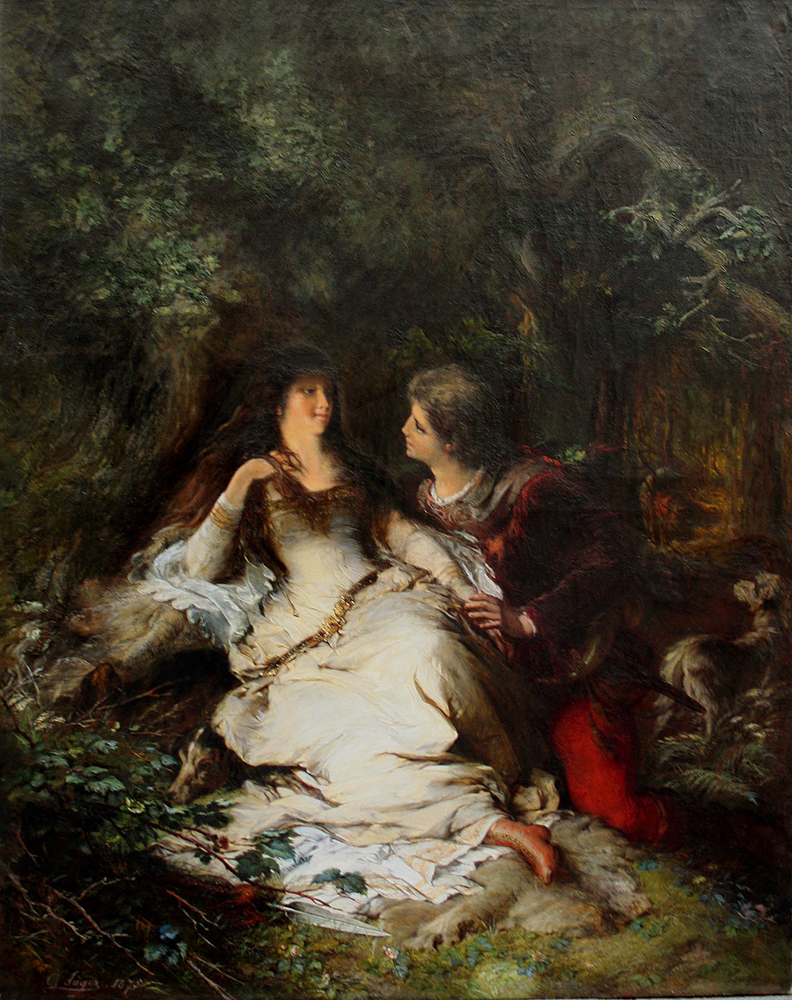
A Couple in the Forest (Tristan and Isolde)

Adelheid Jaeger, née Heuser, known as Adeline (31 March 1809, Gummersbach – 17 December 1897, Bonn) was a German portrait, genre and still-life painter, associated with the Düsseldorfer Malerschule.

== Life and work ==
She was the third of six children born to the paint and wine merchant, Heinrich Daniel Theodor Heuser (1767–1848), and his wife, Katharina Luisa née Jügel (1776–1841). Her grandfather, Johann Peter Heuser, was the founder of a large trading company. Her aunt, the artist Henriette Jügel, taught her how to paint and draw. Her desire to make art her professional career was discouraged by her father, although her sisters, Louise and Alwine would become artists. Another sister, Ida (1817–1880), married the painter Karl Friedrich Lessing in 1841.

In 1831, she was sent to Frankfurt, to live with her uncle, the publisher and bookseller, Carl Christian Jügel. His wife had recently died, and he needed help to care for his two young sons. He was more receptive to her wish to become an artist so, in 1834, he found her a place at the Städelsches Kunstinstitut, where she studied with the portrait painter, Joseph Binder. After seeing a portrait of her sister Alwine, her father finally agreed to support her career choice; arranging private lessons in Düsseldorf with Hermann Stilke and Friedrich Wilhelm von Schadow, the Director of the Kunstakademie. By the end of the 1830s, she was so well established as a portrait painter that the art historian, Hermann Püttmann, mentioned her in his book about the Düsseldorfer Malerschule.

In 1837, she returned to Gummersbach to visit her father, who had been injured in an accident. There she met and, the following year married, pastor Friedrich Wilhelm Jaeger (1809–1868); apparently under some pressure from her parents. They had two sons and three daughters; one of whom, Clara Emma Maria (1844–1916), also became a painter. In 1848, they moved to Cologne, where Friedrich had been named the pastor of a newly created parish; eventually rising to the position of Church Superintendent in 1859. From there, she occasionally travelled to Düsseldorf to pursue her painting; often working in the studios of Karl Ferdinand Sohn. In 1864 the Frankfurter Kunstverein exhibited two of her canvases.

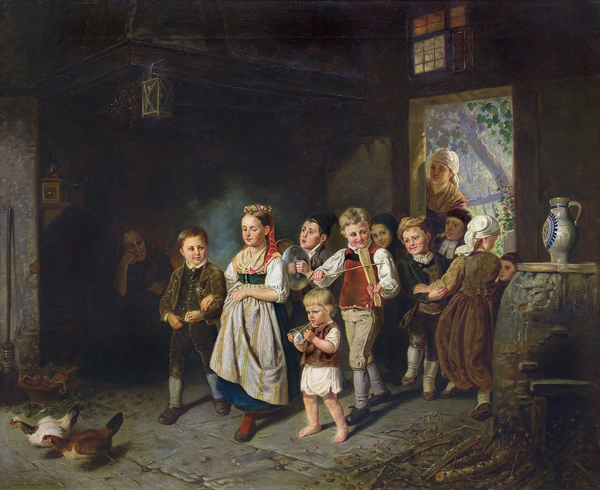
The Children's Wedding

After Friedrich's death, she moved into a home owned by some relatives, where she painted portraits, gave lessons, and took in elderly lodgers. In 1879 she moved again, to Bonn, where she was eventually taken in by her unmarried daughters, Adele and Ida. Although she was plagued by gout, she continued to paint. She died at the age of eighty-eight, from a lung inflammation.
