= A King and Queen in Mourning =

Painting by Karl Friedrich Lessing

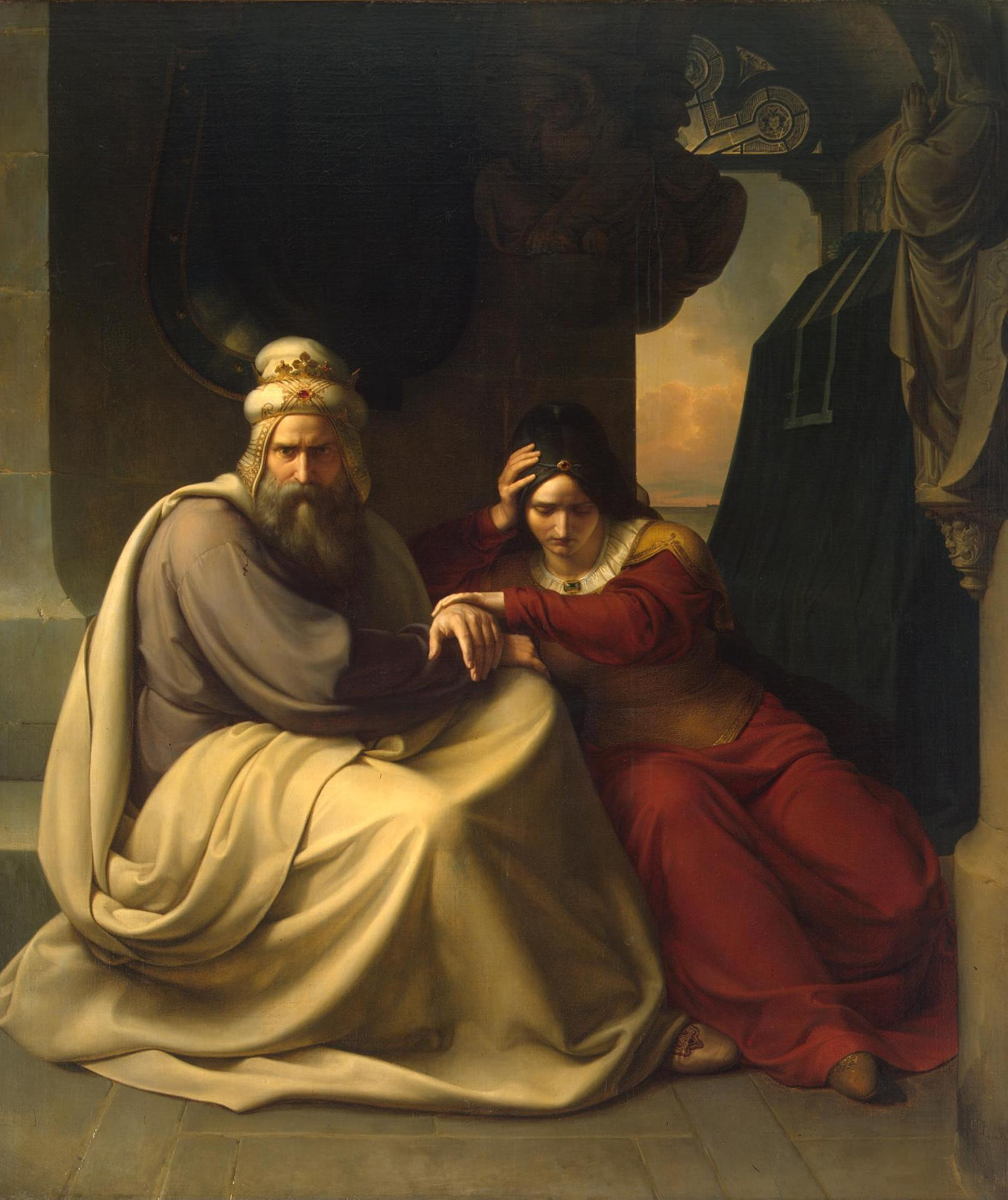
- Artist: Karl Friedrich Lessing
- Year: 1830
- Medium: oil on canvas
- Dimensions: 215 cm × 193 cm (85 in × 76 in)
- Location: Hermitage, Saint Petersburg

A King and Queen in Mourning is an oil on canvas painting by German artist Karl Friedrich Lessing, created in 1830, showing a royal couple mourning their daughter's death, a scene from Ludwig Uhland's poem Das Schloß am Meere. Considered the masterpiece of the "romantic-elegiac soul painting" of the Düsseldorf School of painting, it is now in the Hermitage, in Saint Petersburg.

== History ==
Through the poet-lawyer Friedrich von Uechtritz, the Berliner Kunstverein commissioned Lessing to make an history painting in 1828. The painter then suggested to the art association that he could create the current composition, that he developed in the winter of 1828–1829. The motif seems to have came from the "melancholy" felt over the death of a young girl who was revered in the Düsseldorf artistic circles.

The theme of death had already preoccupied Lessing in his paintings Churchyard with Gravestones and Ruins in the Snow (1826) and Monastery Courtyard in the Snow (1828–1830).

Unlike what he was used to do in landscape painting, in the case of the current work, Lessing was urged by Wilhelm Schadow, the director of the Düsseldorf Art Academy and mentor of the Düsseldorf painters, to work out the figures and objects according to high academic and technical standards and to arrange them carefully. The finished painting was shown at the Berlin Academic Art Exhibition in 1830.

== Description and analysis ==
A king and his wife are seen sitting in the stone, in what appears to be the medieval chapel of a royal building. Through an open window, the view falls on the horizon of a sea. The expression of grief in the royal figures is because of the death of their daughter. Her coffin stands against the wall, hidden under a dark blanket. With these main elements, the painting is inspired by the last verse of Uhland's 1805 poem The Castle by the Sea.

The royal couple, who is sitting in a dark, stage-like room, illuminated by a light source, are wrapped in lavishly flowing robes. The king is wearing a turban-like cap with a crown. His gaze is somber and fixed forward into space. He is perhaps worried because the death of his unmarried daughter will mean the end of his line. On the stone bench at his side, his wife sits bent and with her eyes cast down, seemingly lost in her melancholy. Her right hand rests sympathetically on the limp hand of his husband, and with her left hand she holds her head. The dramatic expression of the painting is concentrated in the posture and gestures of the couple. The dominance of the figures filling the picture is reinforced by the folds of their robes. Their majestic weight and the massiveness of the stone architecture depicted gives the painting a monumental character.

An evening sky with gathering clouds darkens the set. Cracked glass in the leaded glazing of the window and a funeral wreath laid on the coffin cover indicate the motif of earthly transience. The crouching posture of the grieving couple seems to be repeated in the strange stone figures in the walls, which barely emerge from the semi-darkness of the background and seem to attend the couple like a bizarre funeral party. Only a stone sculpture on a column at the right edge of the canvas, which resembles a praying Virgin Mary, but perhaps represents Saint Margaret the Virgin, because of the dragon accompanying her on a shield, takes an upright posture and thus brings a sign of faith and confidence.

== Reception ==
After his appearance at the Berlin Academic Art Exhibition, in 1830, the painting immediately became popular. As a visual representation of a poetic-literary model and the romantic state of mind expressed in it, it was applauded by the public and critics. The painting, which invited viewers to identify and empathize with the mourners, receive high critical praise by people like the dramatist Karl Immermann and the art historian Atanazy Raczyński. Immermann stated that "Lessing seems to have been specially appointed by nature to depict the deeply significant and sublime. (...) In history [painting] he reaches for powerful, imperious scenes, for moments of a titanic state. (...) Figures, posture and folds point to a heroic age. It is a lost, larger world that is reflected in this painting.” Raczyński even declared in 1836 that this was the first work that heralded a new era.

== Bibliography ==
- (in German) Das trauernde Königspaar, 1830. In: Wend von Kalnein: Die Düsseldorfer Malerschule. Verlag Philipp von Zabern, Mainz 1979, ISBN 3-8053-0409-9, pp. 389 f. (Katalog Nr. 155).
- (in German) Bettina Baumgärtel: Die Seelenmalerei und die neuen Helden der Geschichte. In: Bettina Baumgärtel (Hrsg.): Die Düsseldorfer Malerschule und ihre internationale Ausstrahlung 1819–1918. Michael Imhof Verlag, Petersberg 2011, ISBN 978-3-86568-702-9, vol. 2, pp. 160 f. (Katalog Nr. 124).
