= Alwine Schroedter =

German painter

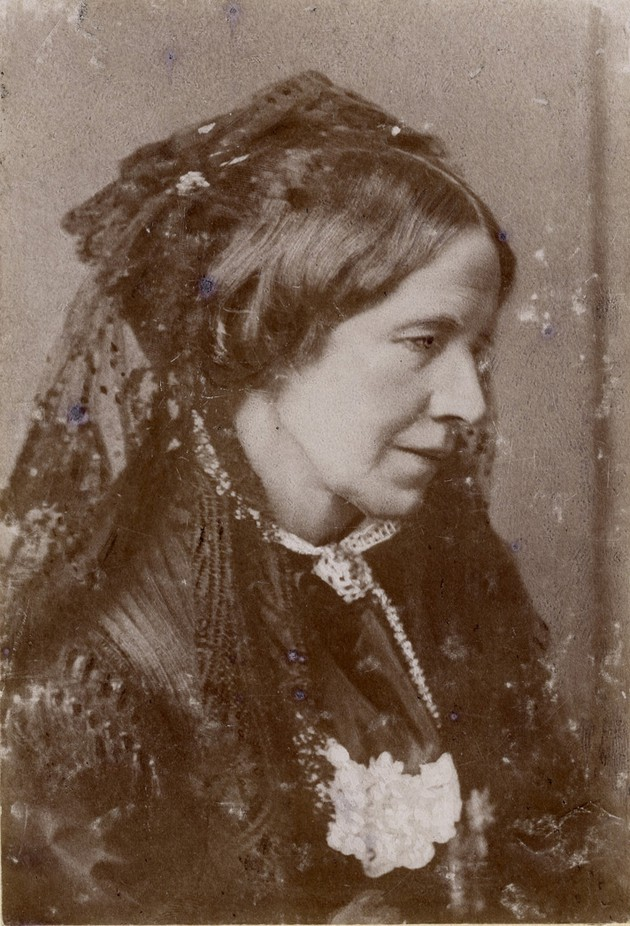
Alwine Schroedter (date unknown)

Alwine Schroedter or Schrödter, née Heuser (13 February 1820 – 12 April 1892), was a German painter and illustrator; associated with the Düsseldorfer Malerschule.

== Life and work ==
She was born in Gummersbach as the last of six children born to the paint and wine merchant, Heinrich Daniel Theodor Heuser (1767–1848), and his wife, Katharina Luisa née Jügel (1776–1841). Her grandfather, Johann Peter Heuser, was the founder of a large trading company. Her aunt, the artist Henriette Jügel, taught her how to paint and draw. Her sisters, Louise and Adeline, also became artists. Another sister, Ida (1817–1880), married the painter Karl Friedrich Lessing in 1841. At the age of seventeen, Alwine went to join Adeline in Frankfurt am Main, where she was helping their widower uncle, the publisher and bookseller, Carl Christian Jügel, raise his two sons.

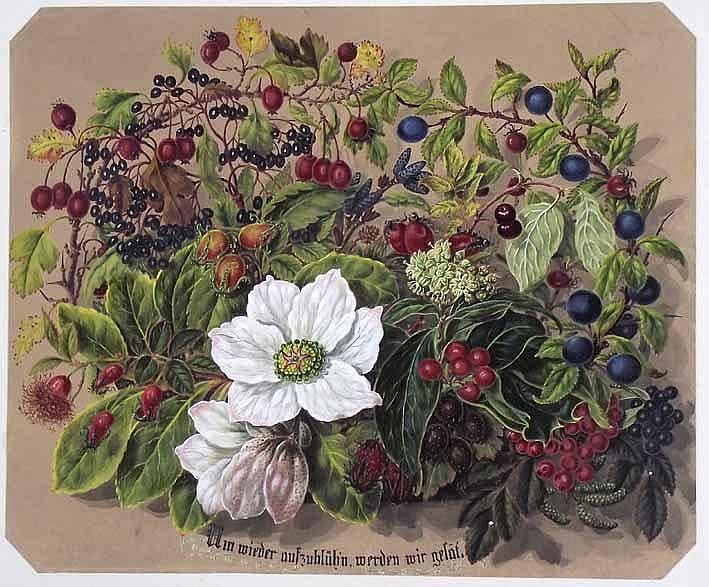
Autumn arrangement with flowers and berries

In 1840, she married the Düsseldorf painter and copper engraver, Adolph Schroedter. They had two sons and two daughters. He introduced her to some of the most prominent artists of the Düsseldorfer Malerschule. This had a lasting influence on her approach to art. In 1848, she and Adolph moved to Frankfurt, where they became part of the cultural circle around the psychologist and children's book author, Heinrich Hoffmann. She also began giving private lessons. In the mid-1850s, they returned to Düsseldorf for a few years.

In 1859, Adolph was appointed Professor of Ornamentation at the recently created Großherzoglich Badische Kunstschule Karlsruhe, where their friend from Düsseldorf, Johann Wilhelm Schirmer, was serving as Director, and her sister Ida's husband Karl was a Professor. Their circle of friends in Karlsruhe was focused around the theatrical director, Eduard Devrient, through whom they met Johannes Brahms and Clara Schumann. Their daughter, Malvine (1847–1901), married the painter, Anton von Werner, in 1871. Adolph died in 1875.

Ida and Karl both died in 1880. Her other children got married and friends moved. In an effort to reduce her feelings of loneliness, she opened a private drawing school for women at her home. One of her best known students was Jenny Nottebohm, who became associated with the Grötzinger Artists' Colony.

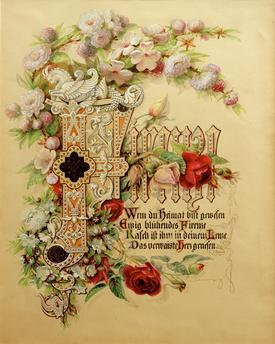
Firenze (Florence)

During her last years, she struggled with a progressive heart condition, which caused her death in 1892 in Karlsruhe, at the age of seventy-two. That same year, the Kunsthalle Karlsruhe held a major retrospective, which included works by Adolph.
