= The Hussite Sermon =

Painting by Karl Friedrich Lessing

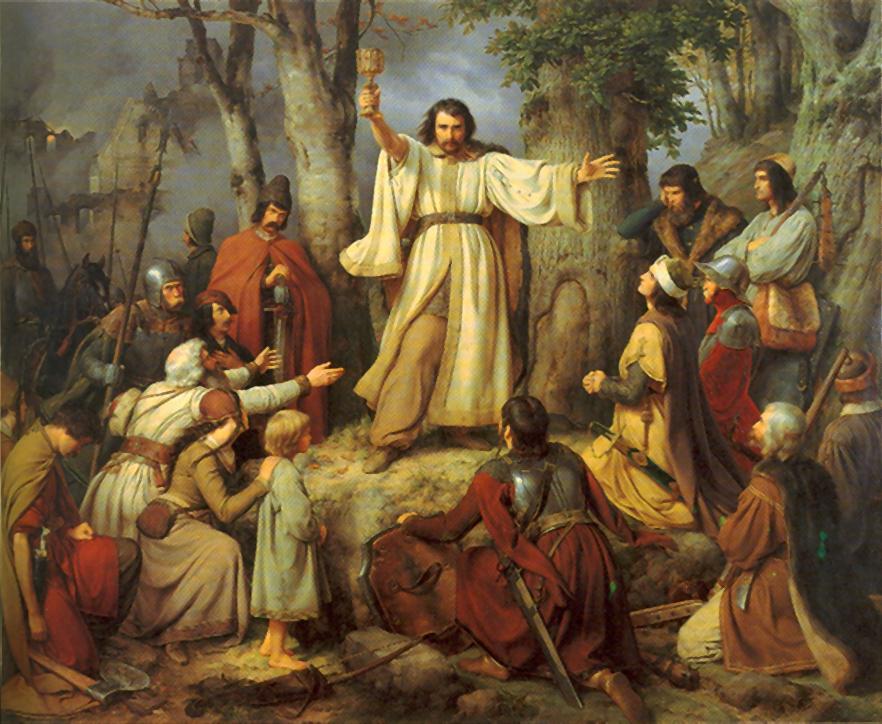
- Artist: Karl Friedrich Lessing
- Year: 1836
- Medium: oil on canvas
- Dimensions: 223 cm × 293 cm (88 in × 115 in)
- Location: Alte Nationalgalerie, Berlin

The Hussite Sermon (German - Die Hussitenpredigt) is a painting by the Düsseldorf-based painter Karl Friedrich Lessing, showing an open-air sermon being delivered by a Hussite preacher in the 15th century. It is now in the Alte Nationalgalerie in Berlin.

In 1834, Crown Prince Frederick William of Prussia saw an oil sketch on the subject by Lessing in 1834 and commissioned him between 1835 and 1836 to produce a full-scale version. The mainly Catholic Rhineland had recently been annexed to the Protestant-dominated Kingdom of Prussia by the Congress of Vienna and so the work was seen as a piece of anti-Catholic propaganda for the area's Protestant minority. In the context of the restoration of the German princes to their thrones and the Vormärz, others also saw it as a criticism of the repressiveness of the states and systems that were put in place by Metternich and the Congress. Middle-class audiences saw it as an expression of opposition to kingly and church authority alike. It was briefly exhibited in Germany and Paris, spreading the reputation of the Düsseldorf school of painting.

== Description and meaning ==
At the center of a concentric group of figures, a circle of medieval warriors, two women and a child, stands a prominent, determined-faced preacher, perhaps Jan Hus, perhaps another spiritual leader of the Hussite movement, dressed in a flowing white robe and facing the viewer, raises a golden chalice in a theatrical gesture. To him a devotee stretches out his arms in religious zeal. The preacher's head is accentuated by flashing vapors. Incident light highlights the figure of the preacher, including part of the group of figures, against the smoky background. With the thoroughly sympathetic depiction of the central figure of the preacher in a crowd of followers, who present a "heretic" as the bringer of salvation, Lessing continued well-known depictions of Jesus and disciples in Christian pictorial tradition. The scene, depicting a field service in a moment of intense religious experience, takes place in or on the edge of a wooded mountainside against the backdrop of a burning complex of buildings, perhaps a monastery, castle, or urban settlement and church. The chalice symbolizes the Hussite-Protestant demand for the chalice communion, the "Communion in both kinds". The burning buildings can be interpreted as a symbol for the historical context of the Hussite Wars, the fight of the Czechs against the German upper class and the teachings of the Roman Catholic Church. The medieval warriors - realistically depicted as aristocrats in armor and as armed peasants - form a close social community together with the women and the child. The production shows them as rebels against an establishment that remains abstract at the moment of religious inspiration.

As a sign of their simplicity and closeness to nature, Lessing depicted the Hussites in the scenic ambience of a natural forest. In Lessing's time, the forest was considered a natural place of original popular belief, folk myths and superstition. As such, it was a common topo of German Romanticism. In his 1837, painting the thousand-year-old oak, this romantic-religious meaning shines through again.

The picture, whose scene is structured like the stage backdrop of a living picture, portrays some of Lessing's painter friends. Thus, the horseman on the left is identified as the landscape painter Johann Wilhelm Schirmer, the history painter Theodor Hildebrandt as the warrior with helmet and lance. The warrior with the white head bandage is probably the genre painter Emil Ebers, Lessing's brother-in-law. The richly dressed man at the bottom right of the picture could be August Becker.

The aspects of religious fanaticism, as well as the phenomena of zeal for reform, national passions and striving for independence, fascinated Lessing in the historical material that Lessing processed with the motif. In 1835, Lessing mentioned the work to his father as the "sermon of the Taborites", by which he can only have meant the Hussite sermon. The reference to the Taborites, who held open-air services with reference to Mount Tabor as the place of the transfiguration of the Lord, perhaps indicates that the illumination of the haze around the preacher's head, its illumination and brilliant white robe of was perceived by the followers as a transfiguration of their spiritual leader and tabor light appearance. In the design of the picture, which opens up many possible interpretations, Lessing ultimately left its exact meaning open.
