= Louise Wüste =

German artist (1805-1874)

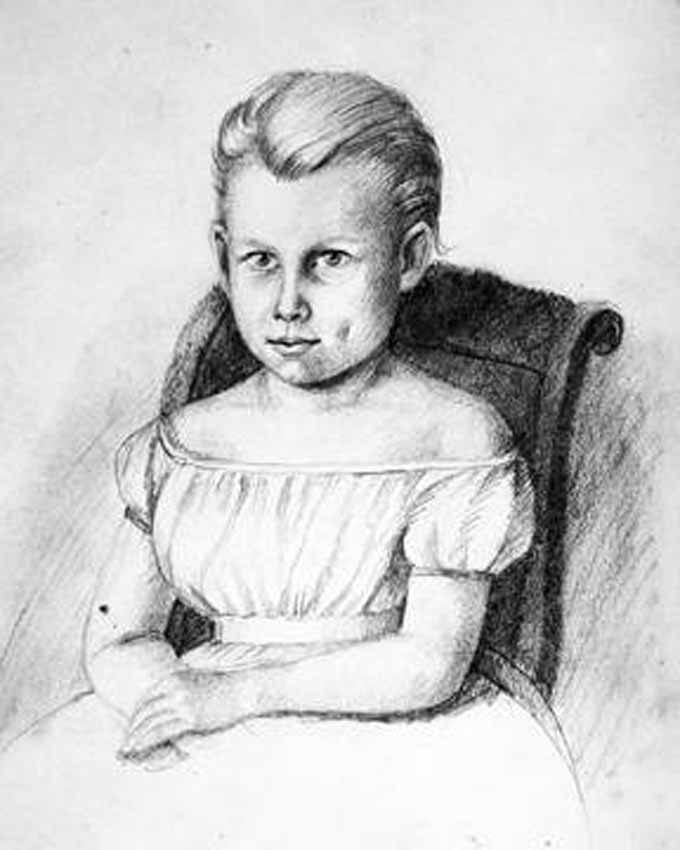
Portrait of her granddaughter, Lille Wueste

Louise Wüste or Wueste, née Heuser (6 June 1805, Gummersbach - 25 September 1874, Eagle Pass, Texas) was a German-American portrait artist; associated with the Düsseldorfer Malerschule.

== Life and work ==
She was the first of six children born to the paint and wine merchant, Heinrich Daniel Theodor Heuser (1767–1848), and his wife, Katharina Luisa née Jügel (1776–1841). Her grandfather, Johann Peter Heuser, was the founder of a large trading company. Her aunt, Henriette Jügel, taught her how to paint and draw, and her mother taught her how to play the harp. Her sisters, Adeline and Alwine also became painters. Another sister, Ida (1817-1880), married the painter Karl Friedrich Lessing in 1841.

In 1824, she married Dr. Peter Wilhelm Leopold Wüste (1795–1832), a frequent guest for musical evenings at the Heuser household. They had two daughters and a son. After Peter's death, she and her children went to live with her parents. There, she established a small painting school for girls. In 1848, after her father's death, she went to live with her daughter, Adeline (1828-1912), who had married an estate manager, Heino Staffel (1818–1904). It was then she decided to take formal art lessons. She therefore went to Düsseldorf, where she studied privately with Friedrich Boser, Karl Ferdinand Sohn, and her brother-in-law, Lessing.

Adeline and her family emigrated to the United States in 1851; settling in San Antonio, Texas. Through the remainder of the 1850s, she lived in Cologne. Then, in 1859, her other daughter, Emma, also emigrated to the United States; settling in Pleasanton, near San Antonio. She soon followed, and went to live with Adeline again. There, she opened a portrait studio. She also devoted herself to sketching Texan and Mexican-American scenes.

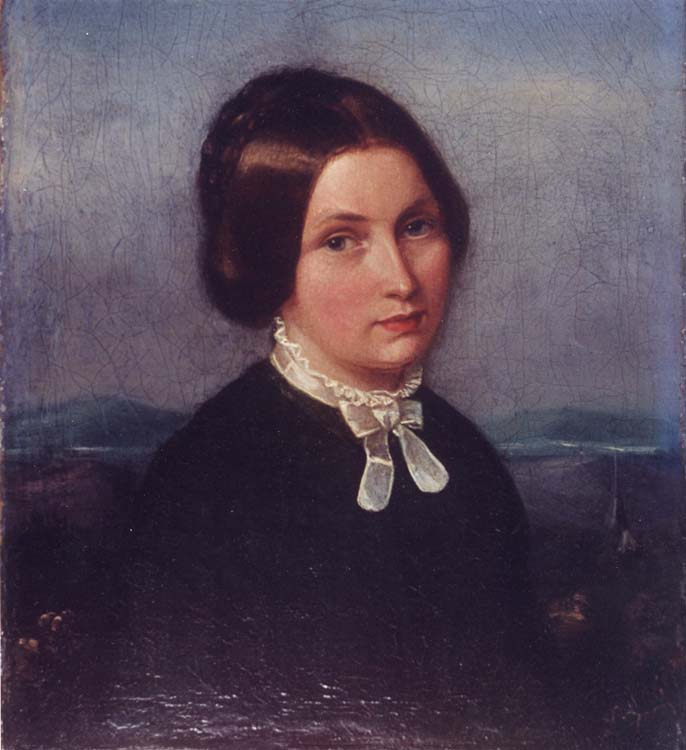
Portrait of her daughter, Adeline Staffel

The outbreak of the Civil War severely reduced her income, but she was able to buy a small house in Eagle Pass, not far from her son, Daniel (1830-1882), who had also emigrated and become a merchant. Her later sketches focus on the people and places along the Rio Grande. Most of her works are in private collections, or still in the possession of their subjects' families. The largest public collection is held by the Witte Museum, in San Antonio.
