= Karl Friedrich Lessing =

German historical and landscape painter (1808–1880)

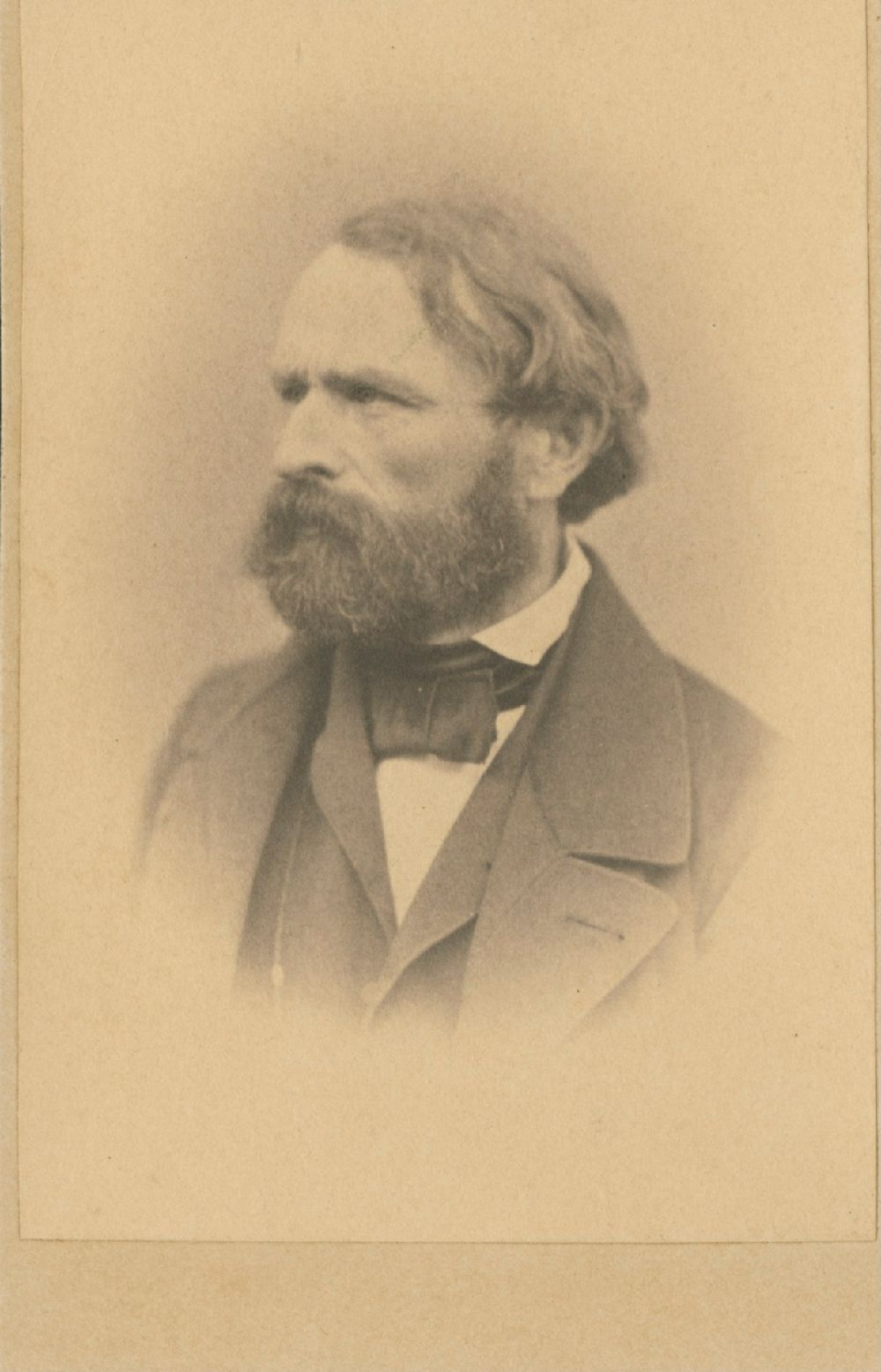
- Karl Friedrich Lessing in a photograph by the firm G. & A. Overbeck (c. 1868)
- Born: Karl Friedrich Lessing; 15 February 1808; Breslau, Prussia
- Died: 4 January 1880 (aged 71); Karlsruhe, German Empire
- Relatives: Christian Friedrich Lessing (brother)

Karl Friedrich Lessing, also known by Carl Friedrich Lessing (15 February 1808 – 4 January 1880), was a German historical and landscape painter, grandnephew of Gotthold Ephraim Lessing and one of the main exponents of the Düsseldorf school of painting.

== Biography ==
Karl Friedrich Lessing was born on 15 February 1808 in Breslau, Prussia (now Wrocław, Poland). His father, also named Karl Friedrich Lessing (1778–1848), was a judicial officer in Breslau, from 1809 on the chancelor of the court of the Free State country of former Polnish-Wartenberg (now Syców, Poland). Lessing's mother, Clementine née Schwarz (1783–1821), was the daughter of a government Chancellor for the House of Hatzfeld in Trachenberg. His brother, Christian Friedrich, became a doctor and botanist. His sister, Franziska Maria (1818–1901), married the painter, Emil Ebers. He spent most of his childhood in Wartenberg, where he developed an early love of nature.

After spending two years at a Catholic school in Breslau, his talent for drawing was noted by the artist, Johann Heinrich Christoph König who, in 1822, arranged for him to study at the Bauakademie in Berlin. The following year, against his father's wishes, he decided to become a painter. He spent three years studying at the Prussian Academy of Arts with the landscape painters Samuel Rösel and Heinrich Dähling. A successful showing in 1825, with the subsequent sale of the painting Kirchhof mit Leichensteinen und Ruinen im Schnee (Churchyard with Gravestones and Ruins in the Snow), reconciled his father to his chosen career. In 1826, he accompanied one of his instructors, Friedrich Wilhelm von Schadow to the Kunstakademie Düsseldorf. There, he became associated with the Düsseldorfer Malerschule. In 1827, he undertook further studies in landscape painting with Johann Wilhelm Schirmer.

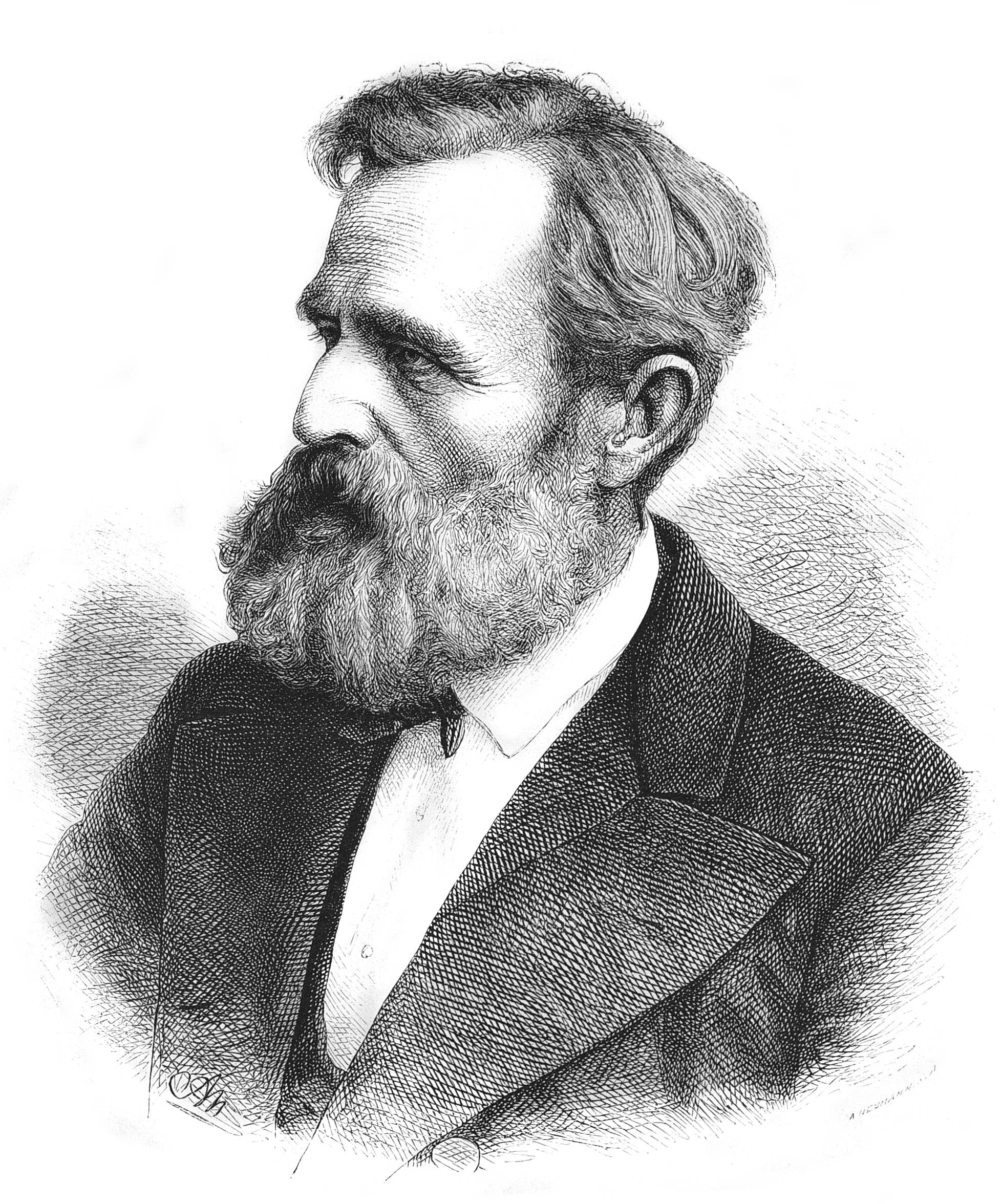
Lessing in 1878, from Die Gartenlaube

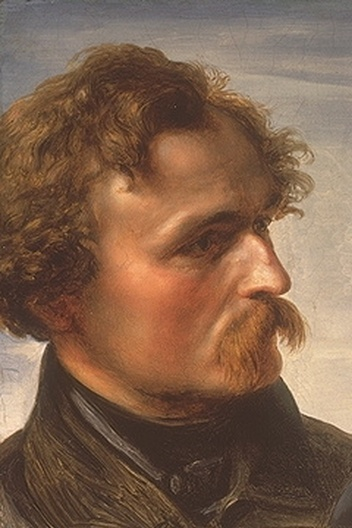
Karl Friedrich Lessing; detail from a group portrait by Julius Hübner (1839)

In the first phase of his career, he painted dark and imaginative landscapes, after the style of Caspar David Friedrich with romantic motivs like castle ruins, left churchyards (Klosterhof im Schnee, 1829, Wallraf-Richartz-Museum, Cologne), or ragged rocks, with staffage figures of monks, knights, robbers, or gypsies. Other subjects he drew from poetry (Lenore, 1802) or tales and legends like A King and Queen in Mourning (Das trauernde Königspaar, 1830, Hermitage Museum, St Petersburg, Russia) after Ludwig Uhland's poem Das Schloß am Meere. Later, Schadow encouraged him to take up history painting and helped him obtain a commission from Count Franz von Spee to paint a cycle of frescoes depicting the life of Frederick Barbarossa at Heltorf Castle near Düsseldorf, the so-called "Barbarossazyklus". He completed part of a monumental representation of the Battle of Iconium, but decided that wall painting did not appeal to him, and allowed another artist at the project, Hermann Plüddemann, to finish the fresco, from his sketches. His most renowned and influential work was The Hussite Sermon (Die Hussitenpredigt, 1836) which had not been a historical subject as such until then, however allowed for a variety of references to contemporary history. The picture went on tour throughout Germany and France and was positively discussed, as, for instance, by Friedrich Theodor Vischer in his essay "Zustand der jetzigen Malerei" (1842).

Lessing married Ida Heuser (1817–1880), daughter of the businessman, Heinrich Daniel Theodor Heuser (1767–1848), in 1841. Three of her sisters, Louise Wüste, Adeline Jaeger and Alwine Schroedter, were painters. They had several children, including the painters, Heinrich and Konrad Lessing, and the sculptor, Otto Lessing. His daughter, Bertha (1844–1914), married the actor, Karl Koberstein (1836–1899). The painter, Hans Koberstein (1864–1945), was their son.

In 1846, he was offered the position of Director at the Städelschen Kunstinstituts in Frankfurt am Main, but declined. Later, in 1858, he accepted an appointment as Director at the Großherzoglich Badischen Gemäldegalerie in Karlsruhe. There, he resumed painting landscapes. In 1867, he received another offer, as Director of the Kunstakademie Düsseldorf, but chose to remain in Karlsruhe.

Over the course of his career, he was awarded several honors. In 1848, he was named a Professor by King Friedrich Wilhelm IV, and was one of the first artists to receive the Pour le Mérite medal. He was also a member of the Prussian Academy and served as chairman of the progressive artists' association "Malkasten" (Paintbox).

During his last decade, he suffered several strokes, which left him unable to work. He died of one in 1880, at the age of seventy-two, and was buried in Karlsruhe's main cemetery, with a memorial designed by his son Otto. The cemetery was levelled in 1956.

== Selected paintings ==
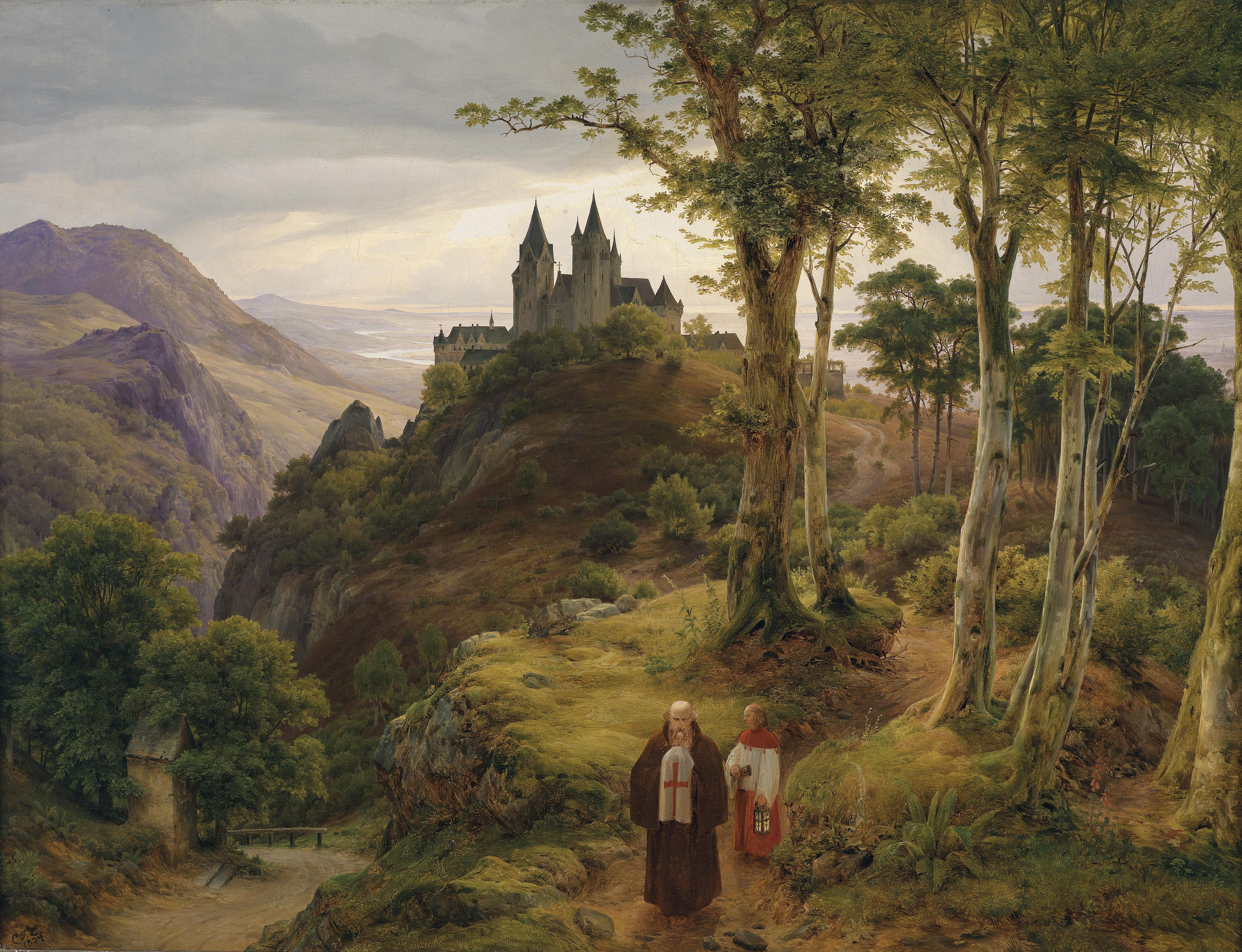
Romantic Landscape with
Monastery Complex, 1834

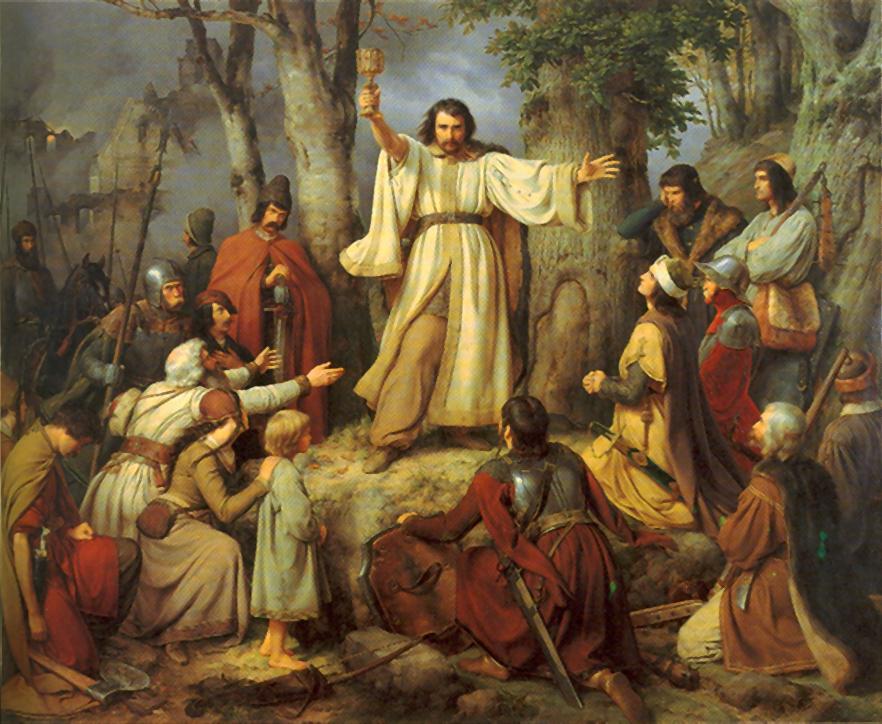
The Hussite Sermon,
depicting Hussites

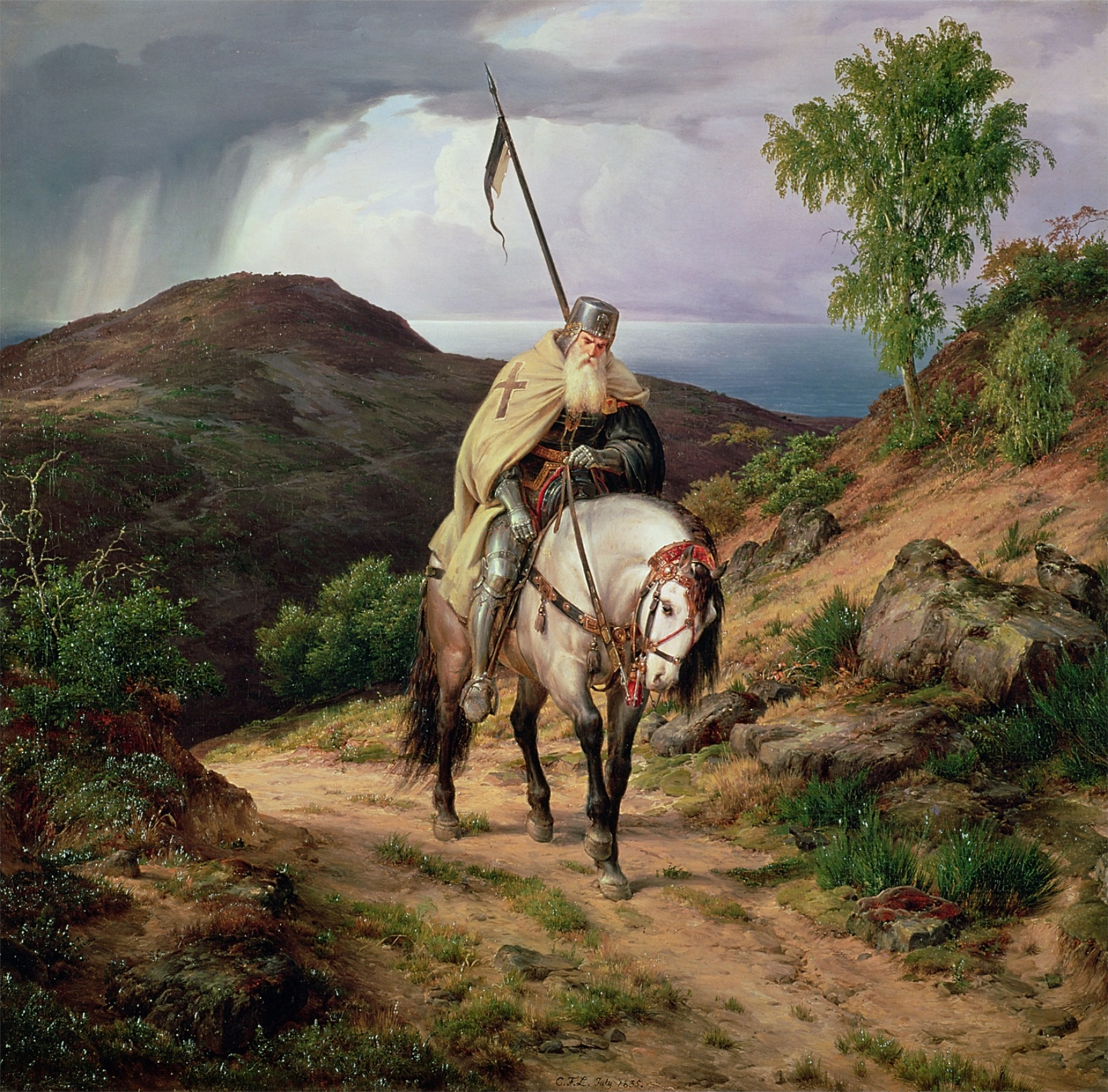
The Last Crusader

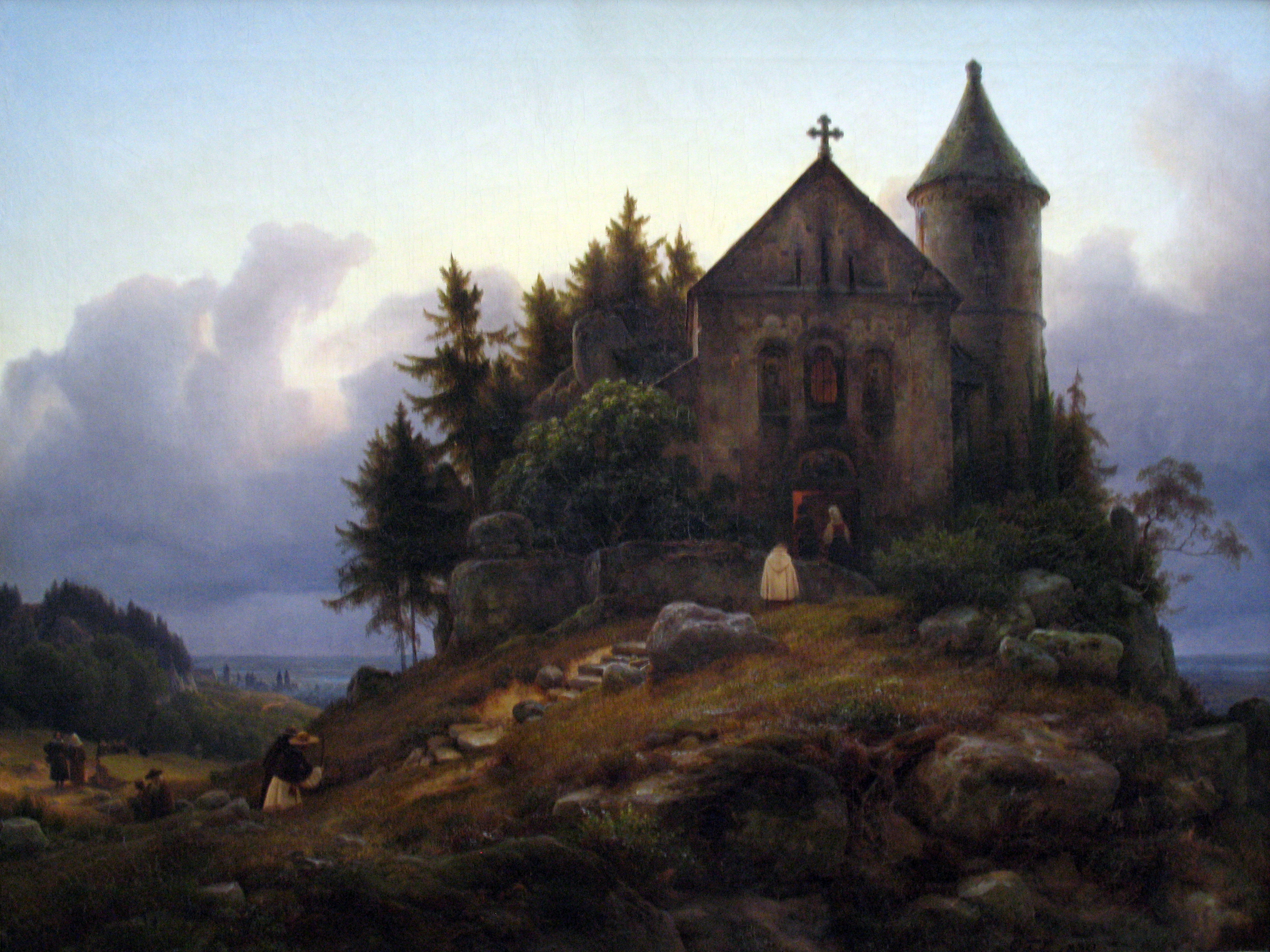
Forest Chapel

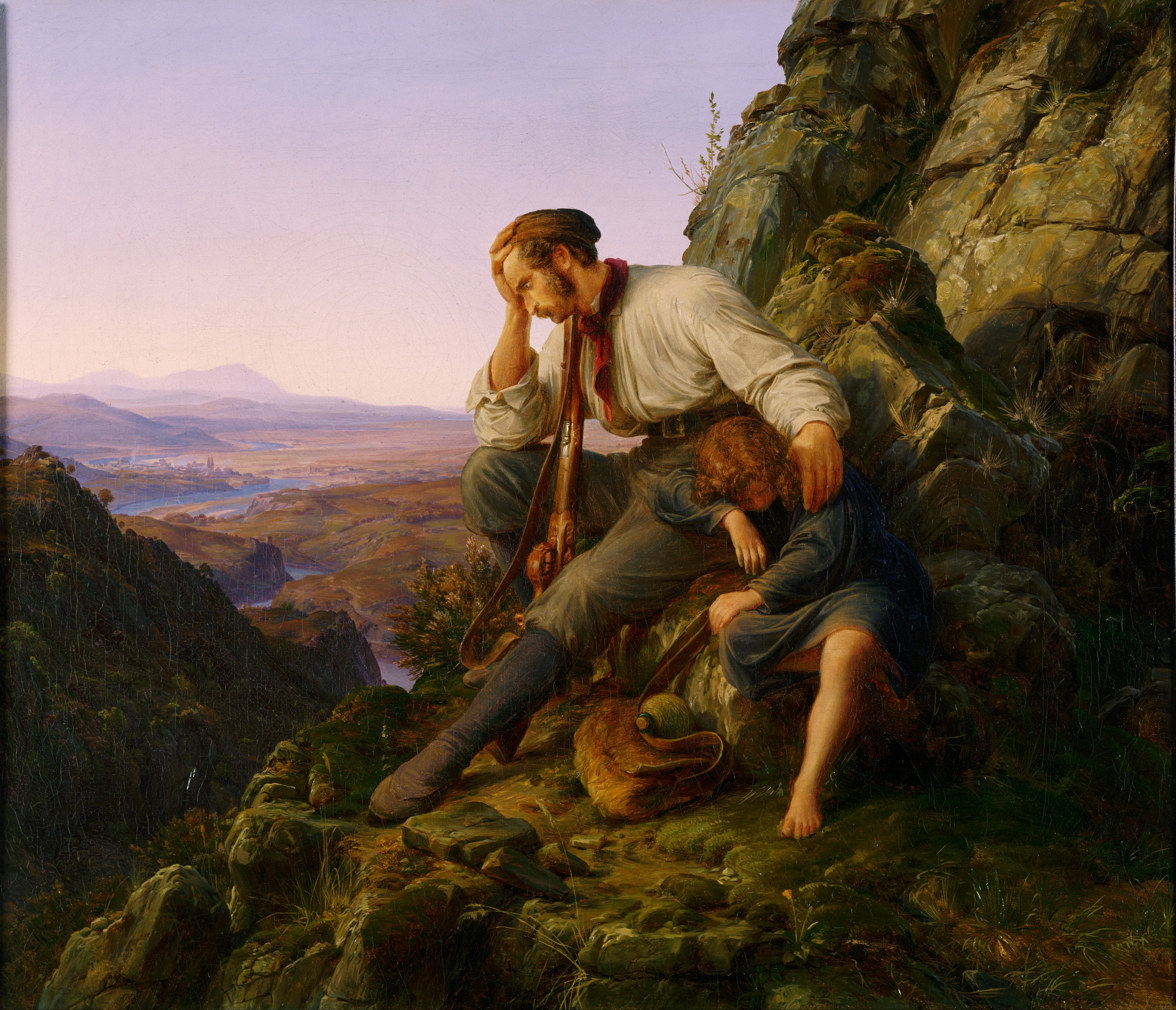
The Robber and His Child
