= Henriette Jügel =

German painter (1778–1850)

Henriette Elisabetha Jeanette Jügel
- Born: January 11, 1778
- Died: March 12, 1850 (aged 72)

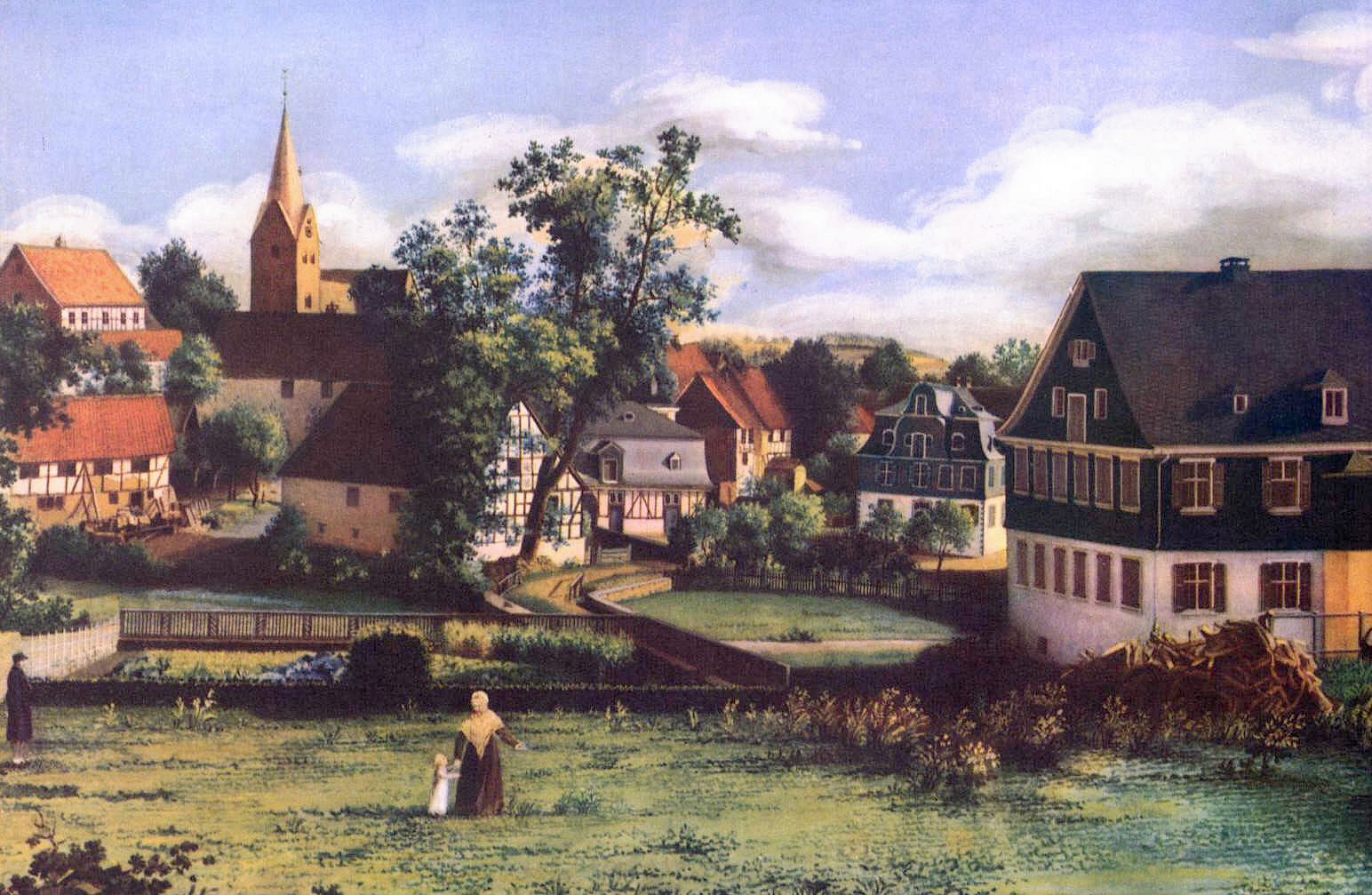
Alt-Gummersbach with the 'Baumhof' (1807), watercolor

Henriette Elisabetha Jeanette Jügel (11 January 1778 –12 March 1850) was a German landscape and portrait painter.

== Life and work ==
Born in Remagen, she was the fifth child born to Johann Friedrich Jügel, a chemist and calico manufacturer, and his wife Anna Wilhelmine née Kirberger, daughter of the merchant and lay judge, Anton Kirberger. After unsuccessful attempts to establish a textile dyeing business in several cities, her family moved to Berlin in 1785. Her father died there in 1800. Her older brother, Friedrich became a copper engraver, while her younger brother Carl went into the bookselling and publishing business. She studied landscape and portrait painting, with a focus on miniatures, in special women's classes at the Berlin Academy. Some of her works were exhibited there.

In 1806, Anna took Henriette and her sister Christiane to Gummersbach, to live with their sister Katharina (1776–1841), who had married the wealthy merchant, Heinrich Daniel Theodor Heuser (1767–1848), two years previously. Christiane established a girls' boarding school. Henriette continued to paint, producing the first view of Gummersbach in 1807. She also gave drawing and painting lessons to her nieces, Adeline, Alwine and Louise, all of whom became artists. She remained unmarried.

For many years, she displayed symptoms of a mental disorder, which worsened with age. Gradually, her thinking became confused. Her symptoms were harmless, however, so she roamed about freely; usually accompanied by a goat on a leash. She was financially supported by her brother Carl, and lived in her brother-in-law Heinrich's home, where she died at the age of seventy-two in 1850.

== Sources ==
- Leo R. Schidlof: La miniature en Europe aux 16e, 17e, 18e et 19e siècles. Akademische Druck- U. Verlagsanstalt, Graz 1964, Vol.1, pg. 425
- Jürgen Woelke: Alt Gummersbach in zeitgenössischen Bildern und Ansichten. 2 Vols.Ernst-Herbert Ullenboom (Ed.), E. Gronenberg, Gummersbach 1975/1980 ISBN 978-3-88265-002-0
- Ingeborg Wittichen: Oberbergische Malerinnen des 19. Jahrhunderts aus der Familie Jügel/Heuser. Museum des Oberbergischen Landes, Schweiger & Pick Verlag, Celle 1980
