= Bettina Baumgärtel =

German art historian

Bettina Baumgärtel (born 1957) is a German art historian who is head of the painting collection of the Museum Kunstpalast in Düsseldorf. She is a leading authority on the art of Angelica Kauffman and founded the Angelika Kauffmann Research Project (AKRP), of which she is the director, in 1990.

== Education ==
Baumgärtel studied art history, archaeology and philosophy at the University of Bonn and the Free University of Berlin. In 1987 she completed her PhD with a dissertation on Angelica Kauffman and the conditions for feminine creativity in the painting of the eighteenth century, supervised by Eduard Trier in Bonn. She began to draw up a catalogue of Kauffman's works.

== Career ==
In 1990, Baumgärtel founded the Angelika Kauffmann Research Project (AKRP), of which she is the director.

Baumgärtel joined the Museum Kunstpalast in Düsseldorf in 1993 as an assistant curator. From 1994 to 2000 she was head of the department of prints and drawings, and since 2000 has been head of the painting collection.

== Selected publications ==
=== German language ===
- Freiheit - Gleichheit - Schwesterlichkeit. Der Freundschaftskult der Malerin Angelika Kauffmann, in: Ausst. Kat. Sklavin oder Bürgerin. Französische Revolution und Neue Weiblichkeit 1760–1838, Viktoria Schmidt-Linsenhoff (Hg.), Historisches Museum Frankfurt/M., Frankfurt/M.1989, S. 325-339
- Angelika Kauffmann (1741-1807). Bedingungen weiblicher Kreativität in der Malerei des 18. Jahrhunderts, (Diss. von 1987), Ergebnisse der Frauenforschung, Bd. 20, FU Berlin (Hg.), Weinheim/Basel 1990
- „Die Anatomie des Nackenden“ – Aktzeichnungen von Angelika Kauffmann (1741-1807), in: Ausst. Kat. Der weibliche Blick. Künstlerinnen und die Darstellung des nackten Körpers, Jutta Hellweg u. Sonja Weis (Hg.), Stadtspielwerk Unna, Unna 1990, S. 42-44
- "Ich zeichne beständig ..." Unbekannte Zeichnungen von Angelika Kauffmann in öffentlichen und privaten Sammlungen, in: Weltkunst, 61. Jg., Nr. 19 u. Nr. 22, 1991, S. 2832–34, 3542-44
- "Der Raphael unter den Weibern". Leben und Werk Angelika Kauffmanns und Marie Ellenrieders im Vergleich; und Katalogbearb. der Werke v. A. Kauffmann, in: Ausst. Kat. "... und hat als Weib unglaubliches Talent". Angelika Kauffmann und Marie Ellenrieder. Malerei und Graphik, Elisabeth von Gleichenstein (Hg.), Städt. Museen Konstanz, Rosgartenmuseum, Konstanz 1992, S. 45–61, 141-178
- Angelika kauffmann 1741–1807. Zu Selbstentwürfen von Malerinnen der Aufklärung. Selbstbildnisse im Gewand des Herkules am Scheideweg. Vortrag u. Publikation, Forum Berliner Wissenschaftlerinnen stellen sich vor, ZE Frauenforschung, Nr. 17, FU Berlin, Ulla Bock (Hg.), Berlin 1992
- Die Attitüde und die Malerei. Paradox der stillen Bewegtheit in Synthese von Erfindung und Nachahmung, in: Ztschr. des Dt. Vereins für Kunstwiss., FU Berlin, Bd. 46, 1992, S. 21-43
- Malerinnen der Aufklärung, hrsg. u. bearb. v. Bettina Baumgärtel, Historisches Frauen-Kunst und Kultur-Projekt, Ausst. Kat. Das Roselius-Haus Böttcherstrasse, Bremen 1993
- Die Galerie der Starken Frauen / La Galerie des Femmes Fortes. Die Heldin in der französischen und italienischen Kunst des 17. Jahrhunderts, bearb. v. Bettina Baumgärtel u. Silvia Neysters, mit Beiträgen v. Sybille Ebert-Schifferer, Barbara Gaehtgens u. a., Ausst. Kat. Kunstmuseum Düsseldorf, Hessisches Landesmuseum Darmstadt, München 1995
- "Der weibliche Raphael der Kunst". Werke der Angelika Kauffmann in Schweizer Sammlungen, in: Kunst + Architektur, 46. Jg., 1995, Heft 4, S. 377-384
- Angelika Kauffmann: une Européenne à Rome (frz.), Ausst. Kat. Entre Rome et Paris. Œuvres inédites du XIVe au XIXe siècle, Jörg Zutter (Hg.), Musée Cantonal des Beaux-Arts, Lausanne 1996, S. 26-34
- Augenzeugen. Die Sammlung Hanck. Papierarbeiten der 80er und 90er Jahre, bearb. v. Bettina Baumgärtel, Ausst. Kat. Kunstmuseum Düsseldorf, Düsseldorf 1997
- Angelika Kauffmann 1741–1807. Retrospektive, hrsg. u. bearb. v. Bettina Baumgärtel, mit Beiträgen von David Alexander, Brian Allen, Werner Busch, Steffie Roettgen, Peter S. Walch u. a., Ausst. Kat. Kunstmuseum Düsseldorf, München, Haus der Kunst, Chur, Bündner Kunstmuseum, Ostfildern-Ruit 1998
- Angelika Kauffmann. Echt oder falsch? - Eine Auswahl von Kopien, Fälschungen und Falschzuschreibungen, in: Weltkunst, 68. Jg., Nr. 13, 1998, S. 2410-2414
- Kauffmann, Maria Anna Angelika (Angelica) Catharina, in: Biografisches Lexikon der Schweizer Kunst, SIK (Hg.), Zürich /Lausanne 1998, Bd. 1, S. 559-561
- "Immer ein hübscher Bursche, aber keine Spur von mir". Das Goethebildnis von Angelika Kauffmann und seine Rezeption, unpubl. Vorträge gehalten ab 1999
- Angelika Kauffmann zwischen Gefühlskultur und Global playing. Selbsteinschreibungen einer Künstlerin in die 'Kunstgeschichte' oder Fremdeinschreibungen in eine Künstlerin und ihr Werk? Internationales Kolloquium Klassizismus und Kosmopolitismus. Aspekte des Kulturaustauschs um 1800, SIK ISEA Zürich 2001, unpubl. Vortrag
- Cléopatre ornant la tombe de Marc Antoine de Angelika Kauffmann, in: Cléopatre dans le miroir de l’art occidental, Ausst. Kat. Musée Rath, Genf, Mailand 2004, S. 239-242
- Ein Fest der Malerei. Die niederländischen und flämischen Gemälde des 16.-18. Jahrhunderts. Bestandskat. der Gemäldesammlung museum kunst palast – Sammlung der Kunstakademie Düsseldorf, bearb. v. Bettina Baumgärtel, Mitarbeit Kathrin Bürger, Leipzig 2005
- Begabte Künstlerin oder „Ausnahmefrau“? Zwei Ausstellungen in Vorarlberg würdigen die Malerin Angelika Kauffmann, Rez. in: NZZ 8./9. September 2007, S. 49
- Zwischen Rokoko und Revolution – zum 200. Todestag der Angelika Kauffmann, in: Weltkunst, 77. Jg., Heft 6, Juni 2007, S. 54-57
- Kauffmann, Maria Anna Angelika (Angelica) Catharina, in: Historisches Lexikon der Schweiz, Bern 2007, Bd. 7
- Himmlisch-Herrlich-Höfisch, Peter Paul Rubens, Johann Wilhelm von der Pfalz und Anna Maria Luisa de’ Medici, Jubiläumsausst. der Landeshauptstadt Düsseldorf, museum kunst palast Düsseldorf, hrsg. u. bearb. v. Bettina Baumgärtel, mit einer DVD u. 3D Animation, mit Beiträgen v. Nils Büttner, Friedhelm Mennekes u. a., Leipzig 2008
- Künstlerpaare des 18. Jahrhunderts. Angelika Kauffmann & Antonio Zucchi, Maria Cosway & Richard Cosway, Adélaide Labille-Guiard & André Vincent, Elisabeth Vigée-Le Brun & Jean-Baptiste-Pierre Le Brun, in: Ausst. Kat. Künstlerpaare. Liebe, Kunst und Leidenschaft, B. Schäfer u. A. Blühm (Hg.), Wallraf-Richartz-Museum & Fondation Corboud, Köln, Ostfildern 2008, S. 34-47
- Amor und Psyche – Angelika Kauffmann und Louise von Anhalt-Dessau, in: Frau und Gärten um 1800. Weiblichkeit – Natur – Ästhetik, Christiane Holm u. Holger Zaunstöck (Hg.), Halle/S. 2009, S. 92-116
- Angelika Kauffmann und der Freundschaftskult der Künstlerinnen. Bildtypologien der Freundschaft um 1800, in: Schwestern und Freundinnen. Zur Kulturgeschichte weiblicher Kommunikation, Eva Labouvie (Hg.), Köln/Weimar/Wien 2009, S. 221-242
- Lasset die Kindlein zu mir kommen – Angelika Kauffmann und Philipp Otto Runge, in: Wallraf-Richartz-Jahrbuch für Kunstgeschichte, Bd. LXX, Köln 2009, S. 195-222
- Weltklasse. Die Düsseldorfer Malerschule 1819 – 1918“, Ausst. Kat. Museum Kunstpalast Düsseldorf, bearb. u. hrsg. v. Bettina Baumgärtel, mit Beiträgen von Valentina Anker, Bettina Baumgärtel, Frank Büttner, Hans Körner u. a., Petersberg 2011, Bd. 1. Essays, Bd. 2 Katalog (engl. Ausgabe 2011: The Düsseldorf School of Painting and Its International Influence 1819 – 1918)
- Kauffmann (Kauffman), Maria Anna Angelika (Angelica) Catharina, in: Allgemeines Künsterlexikon aller Länder und Zeiten, München 2013 (und online)

=== English language ===
- Is the King Genderless? The Staging of the Female Regent as Minerva Pacifera, in: Ausst. Kat. Women Who Ruled: Queens, Goddesses, Amazons in Renaissance and Baroque Art, Annette Dixon (Hg.), The University of Michigan Museum of Art, London 2002, S. 96-117
