= Joseph Binder (painter) =

Austrian artist (1805–1863)

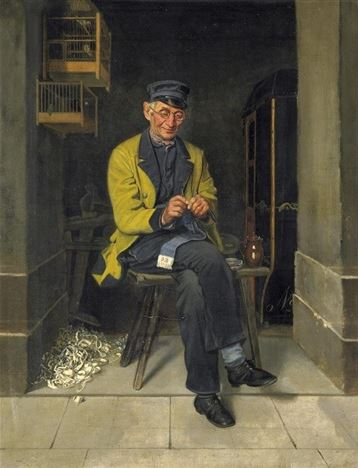
A Litter Carrier at the Church of All Saints

Joseph Binder (15 February 1805, Vienna - 16 April 1863, Kaltenleutgeben) was an Austrian portrait, history and religious painter. His year of birth is stated as being in 1798 or 1803.

== Life and works ==
His father worked as a custodian for a local count. From 1816 to 1826, he studied intermittently at the Academy of Fine Arts in Vienna. He continued his studies at the Academy of Fine Arts, Munich, from 1827 to 1834. While there, he also worked as an assistant to the Nazarene painter, Heinrich Maria von Hess, helping him decorate the Church of All Saints. In 1828, he became a member of the Kunstverein München (Munich Artists' Association).

He moved to Frankfurt am Main in 1835, where he worked as a teacher at the Städelschule until 1839. During this time, he continued to work as a portrait painter. His imaginative, posthumous portrait of King Albert II is displayed in the Imperial Hall at the Römer.

In 1847 he returned to Vienna and, the following year, was elected a member of the Academy. He was appointed a teacher at the drawing school in 1851. In his later years, he added religious scenes to his repertoire, influenced by his earlier contact with the Nazarenes. Under the direction of Josef von Führich, he was involved in decorating the Altlerchenfelder Pfarrkirche (parish church), designing a cycle of frescoes depicting the Creation for the church's vestibule. From 1861, he was a member of the Vienna Künstlerhaus.

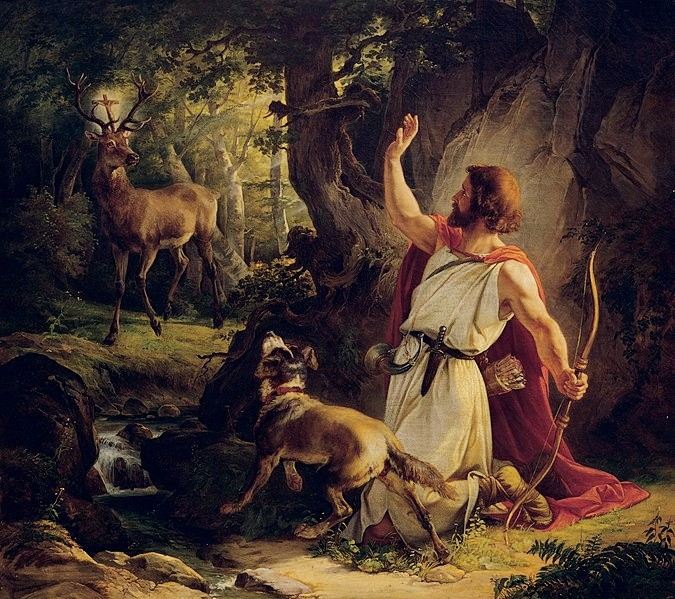
The Conversion of Saint Eustace

The following are some of his best known works:

- Madonna and Child.
- The Conversion of the Robber Julian.
- St. Catharine of Siena visiting a poor family.
- St. Florian.
- Conversion of St. Eustace. (In the Belvedere, Vienna.)
