= Neo-Byzantine architecture =

Late-19th-century architectural revival movement

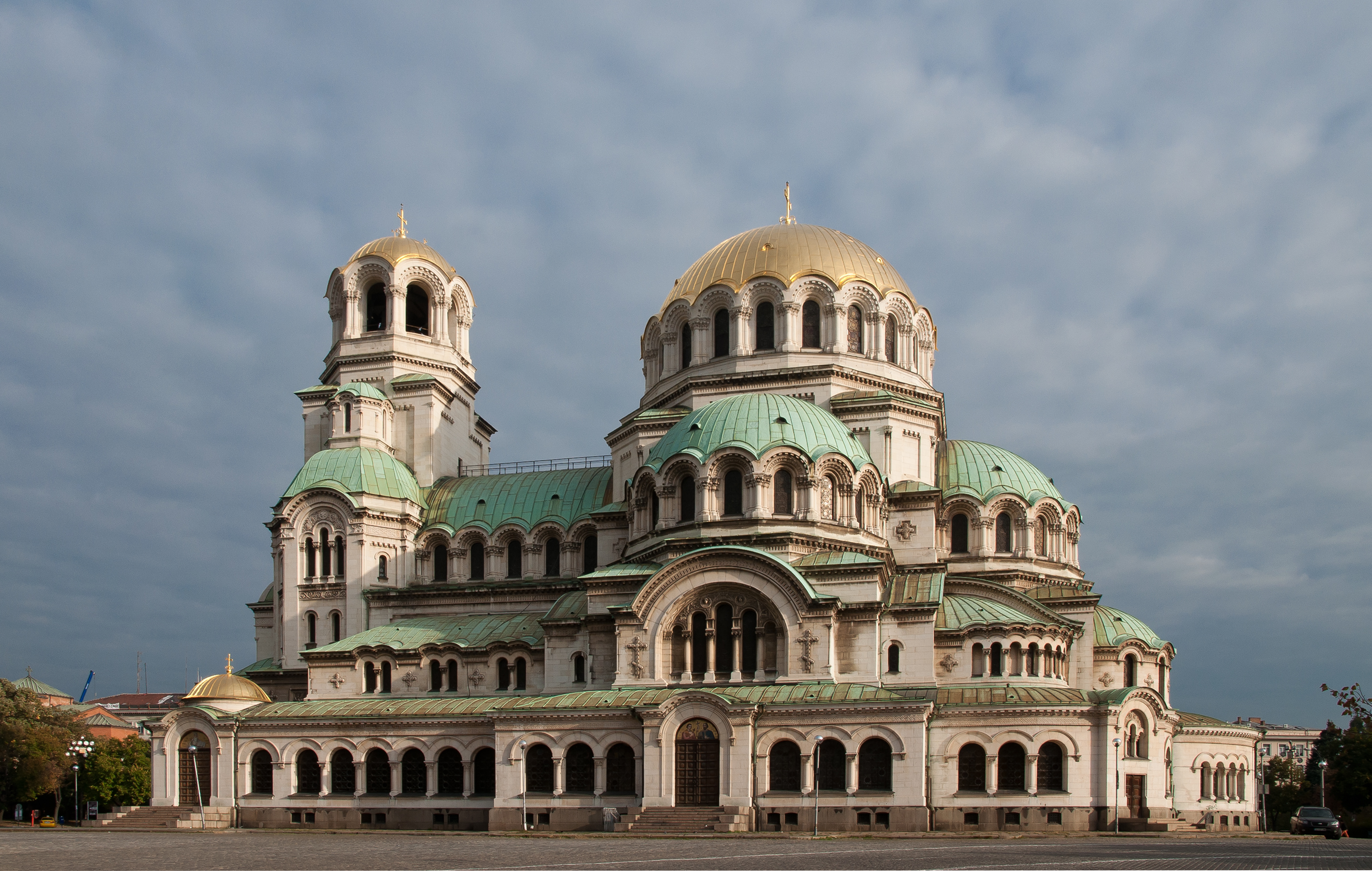
Alexander Nevsky Cathedral, Sofia, by Alexander Pomerantsev

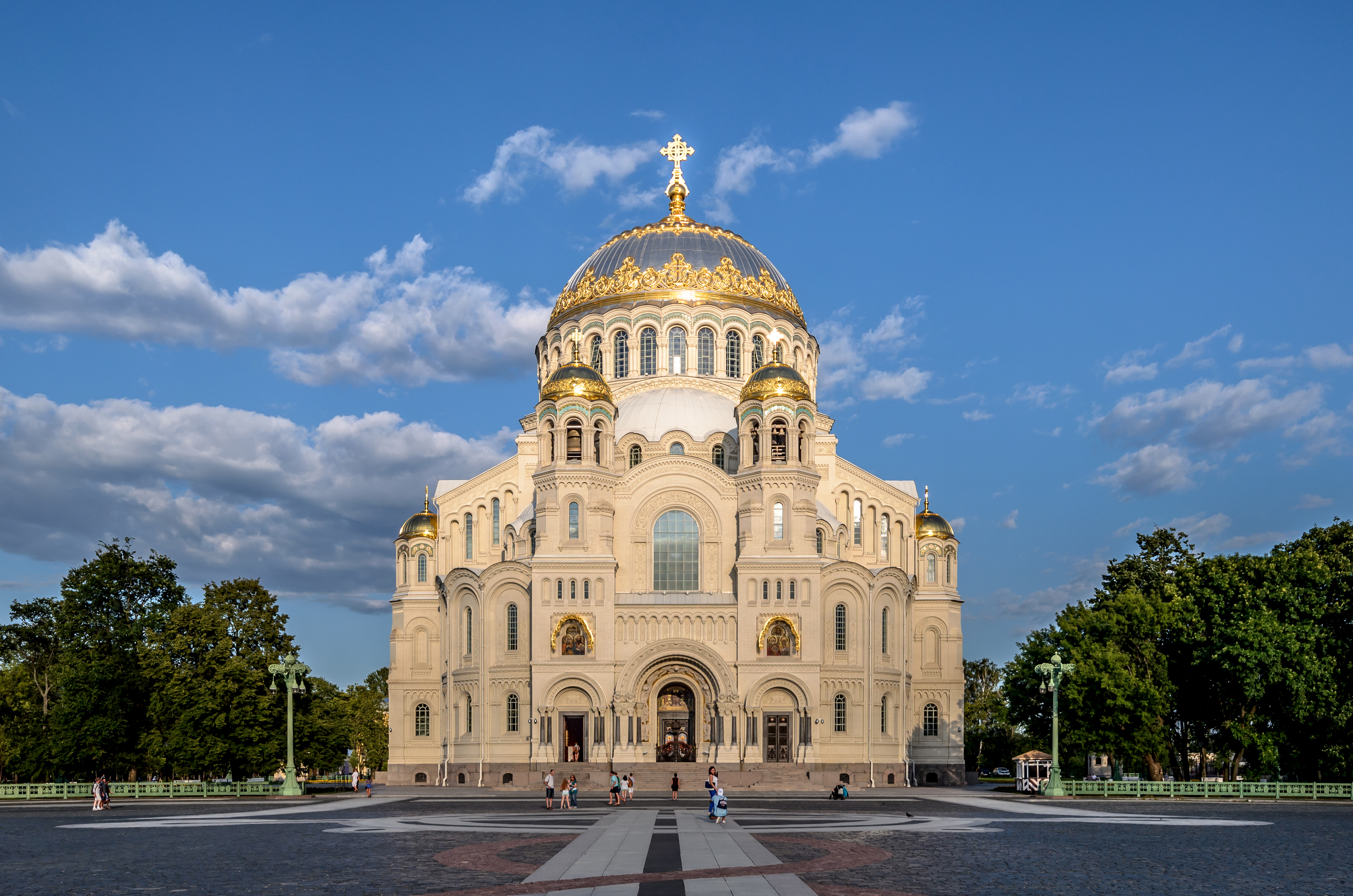
Naval Cathedral of Saint Nicholas in Kronstadt, by Vasily Kosyakov

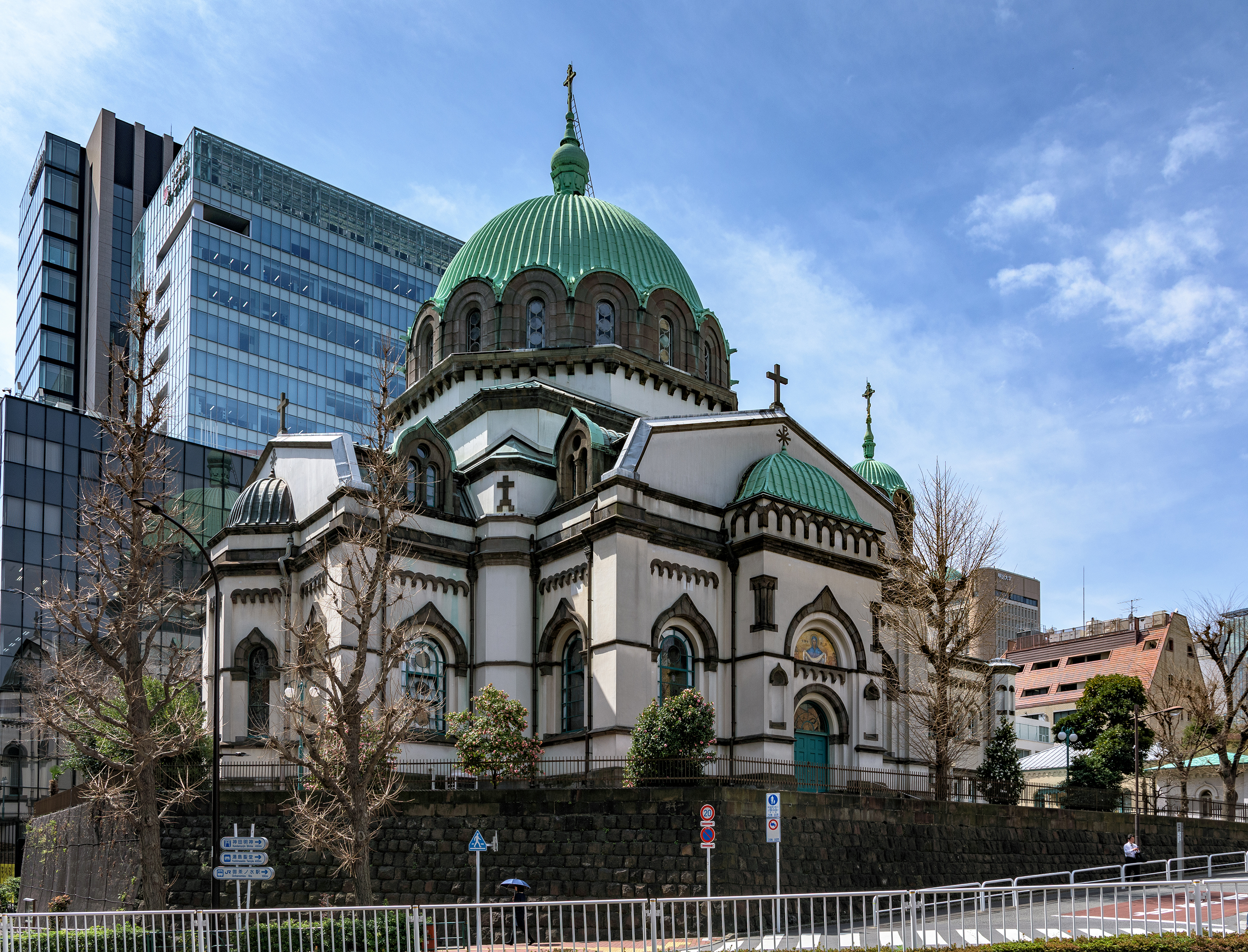
Holy Resurrection Cathedral in Chiyoda, Tokyo, by Josiah Conder

Neo-Byzantine architecture (also referred to as Byzantine Revival) was a revival movement, most frequently seen in religious, institutional and public buildings. It incorporates elements of the Byzantine style associated with Eastern and Orthodox Christian architecture dating from the 5th through 11th centuries, notably that of Constantinople (present-day Istanbul) and the Exarchate of Ravenna.

Neo-Byzantine architecture emerged in the 1840s in Western Europe and peaked in the last quarter of the 19th century with the Sacré-Coeur Basilica in Paris, and with monumental works in the Russian Empire, and later Bulgaria. The Neo-Byzantine school was active in Yugoslavia in the interwar period.

== Byzantine Architecture ==
Byzantine architecture developed during the time of the Byzantine Empire, which began after 330 AD when Emperor Constantine moved the capital of the Roman Empire from Rome to Byzantium, later called Constantinople and today known as Istanbul.

Early Byzantine architecture was the direct continuation of Roman architecture. Important examples form this period can still be seen in Ravenna and Constantinople, including churches such as Hagia Sophia, St. Irene, and Sts. Sergius and Bacchus (often called little Hagia Sophia). Other surviving structures include the walls of Constantinople and the Basilica Cistern.

Over time, Byzantine architecture developed its own unique style. Influences from the Near East became more visible, and architects began using the Greek cross plan in church designs. Brick became more common than stone, classical Roman elements were adapted more freely, and decorative mosaics replaced carved stone decoration. Architects became one of the defining features of Byzantine churches.

== Russian Empire ==
Sophia Cathedral in Pushkin (1782–1788) was the earliest and isolated experiment with Byzantine treatment of otherwise neoclassical structures. In 1830s Nicholas I of Russia promoted the so-called Russo-Byzantine style of churches designed by Konstantin Thon. Nicholas I despised true Byzantine art; Thon's style in fact had little common with it. Notably, Thon routinely replaced the circular Byzantine arch with a keel-shaped gable, and the hemispherical Byzantine dome with an onion dome; layout and structural scheme of his churches clearly belonged to neoclassical standard.

True Byzantine art, popularized by Grigory Gagarin and David Grimm, was adopted by Alexander II of Russia as the de facto official style of the Orthodox Church. Byzantine architecture became a vehicle of Orthodox expansion on the frontiers of Empire (Congress Poland, Crimea, the Caucasus). However, few buildings were completed in the reign of Alexander II due to financial troubles. Alexander III changed state preference in favor of Russian Revival trend based on 16th–17th century Moscow and Yaroslavl tradition, yet Byzantine architecture remained a common choice, especially for large cathedrals. Neo-Byzantine cathedrals concentrated in the western provinces (Poland, Lithuania), the Army bases in Caucasus and Central Asia, the Cossack hosts and the industrial region in Urals around the city of Perm. Architects David Grimm and Vasily Kosyakov developed a unique national type of a single-dome Byzantine cathedral with four symmetrical pendentive apses that became the de facto standard in the 1880s–1890s.

The reign of Nicholas II was notable for the architect's turn from this standard back to Hagia Sophia legacy, peaking in the Naval Cathedral in Kronstadt and Poti cathedral. These designs employed reinforced concrete that allowed very fast construction schedule; their interiors contained clear references to contemporary Art Nouveau yet the exteriors were a clear homage to medieval Constantinople. Russian Neo-Byzantine tradition was terminated by the Russian Revolution of 1917 but was continued by emigrant architects in Yugoslavia and Harbin.

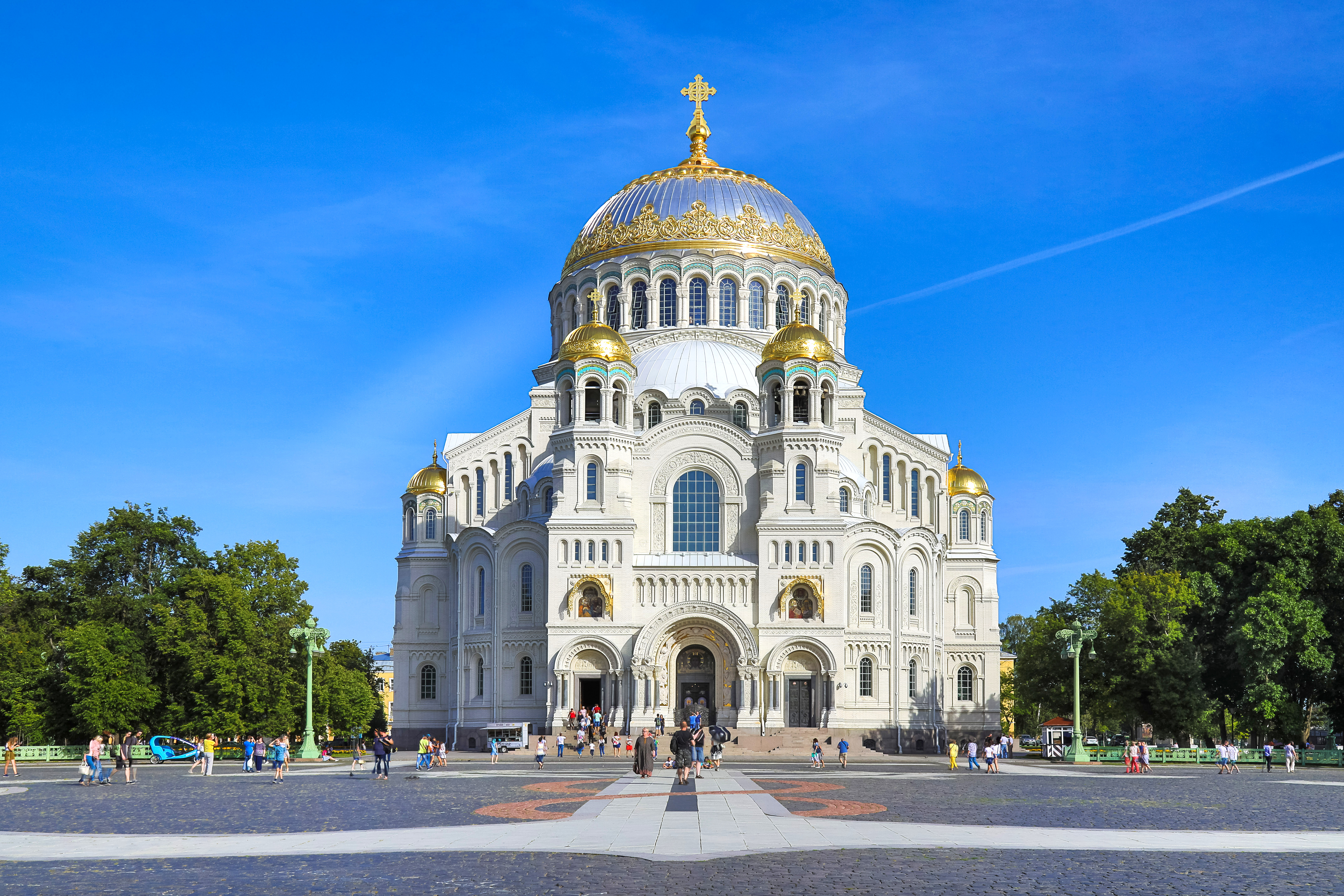
Naval Cathedral, Kronstadt

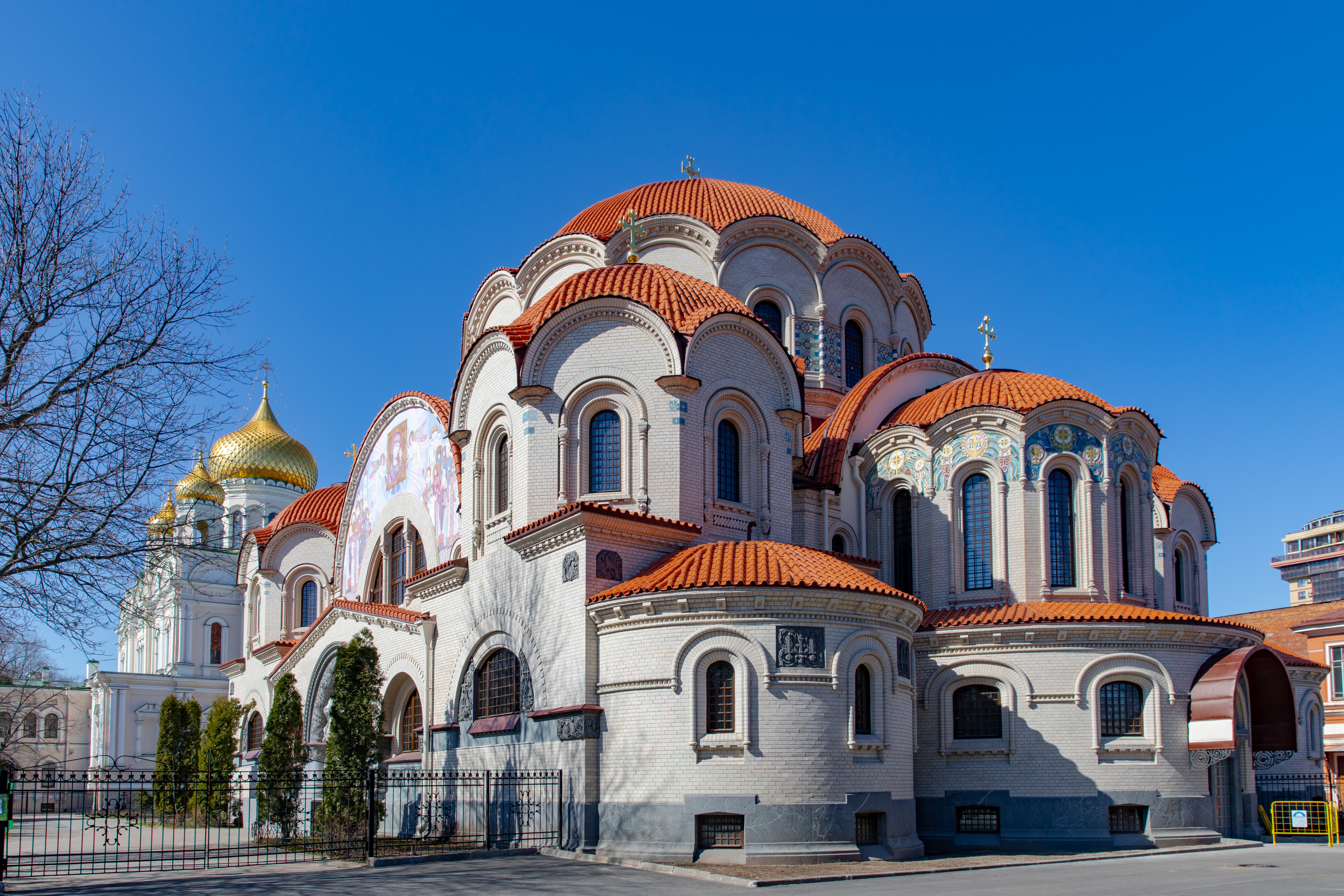
The Kazan church, Novodevichy Cemetery, St. Petersburg

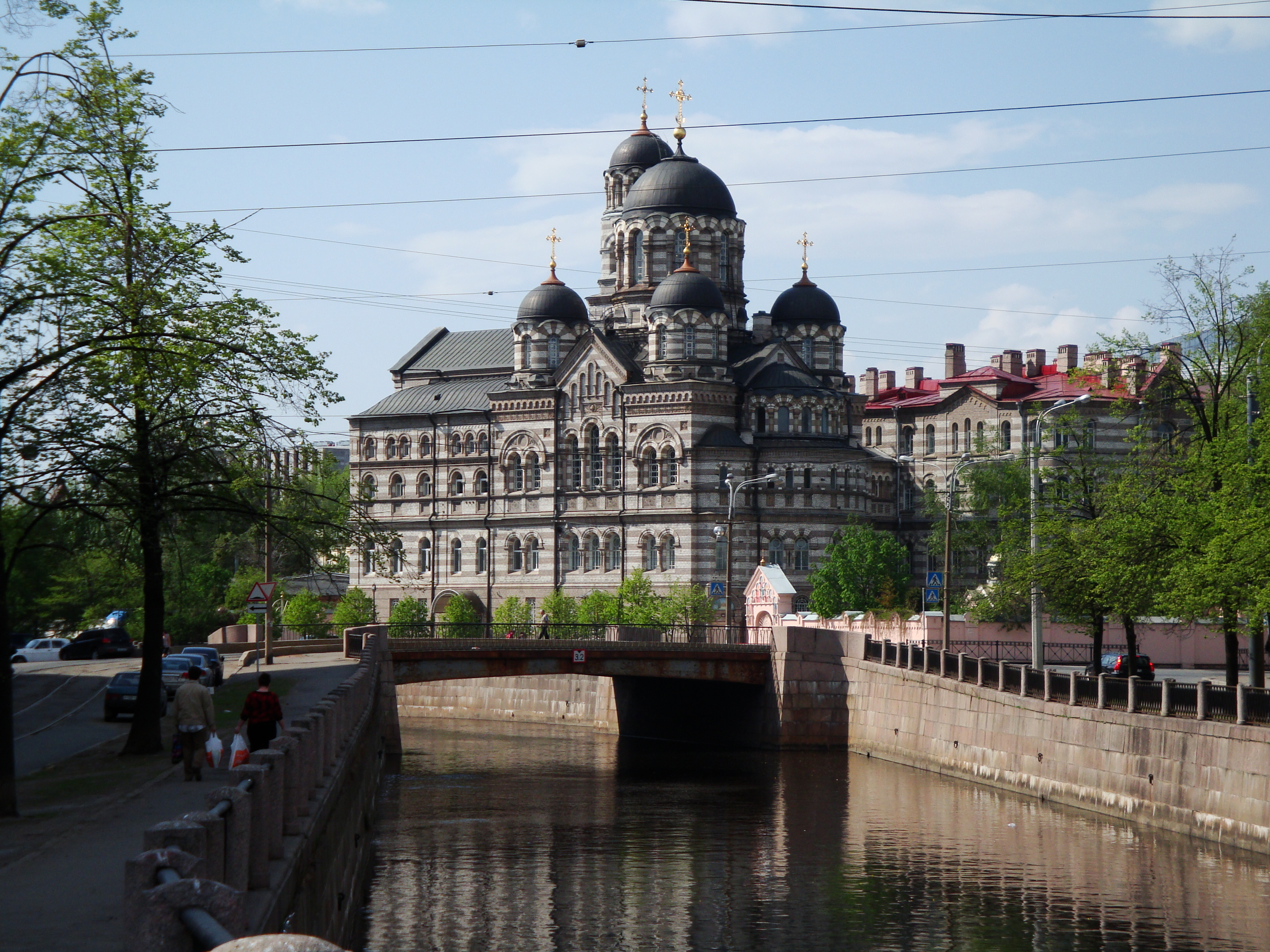
Ioannovsky Convent, St. Petersburg

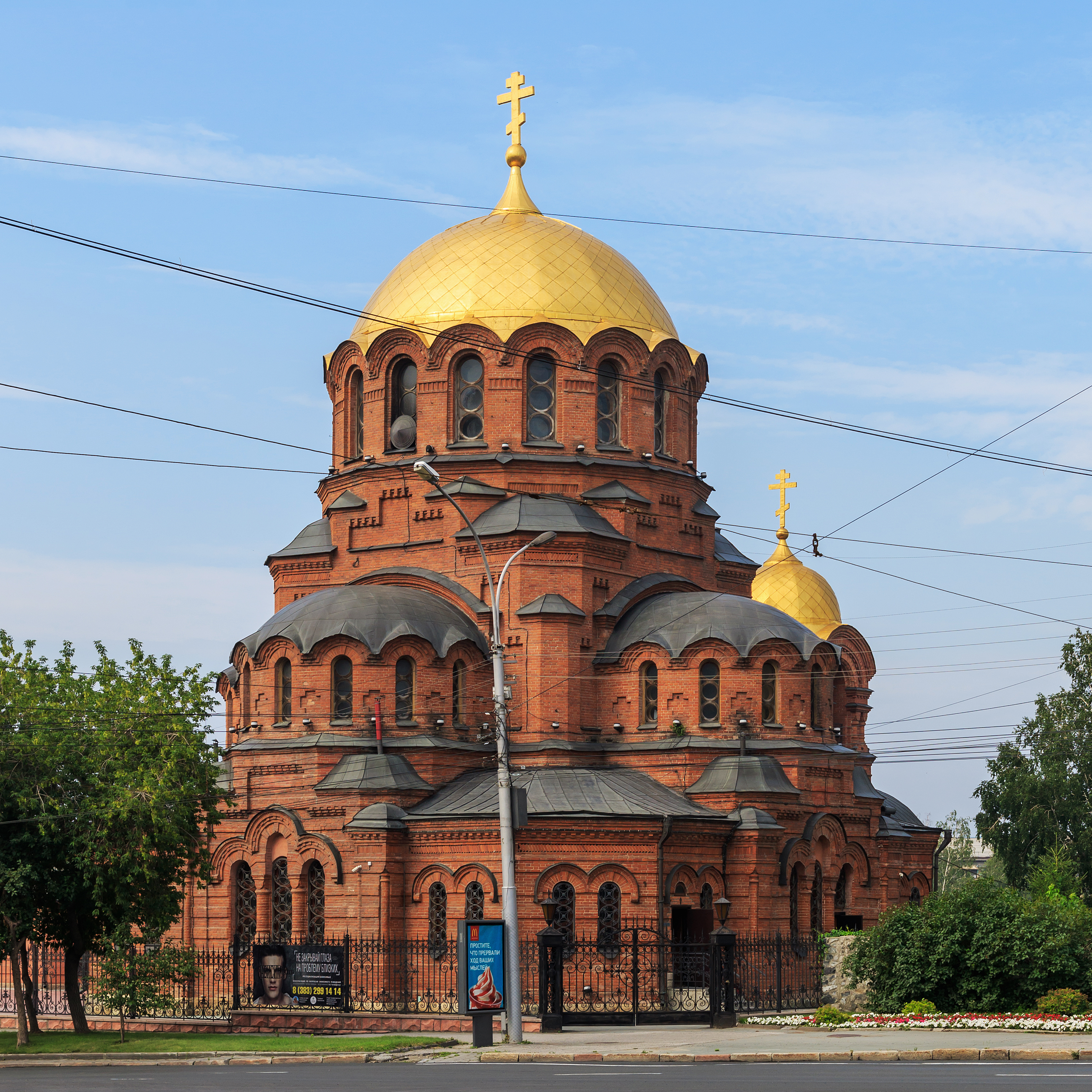
Alexander Nevsky Cathedral, Novosibirsk

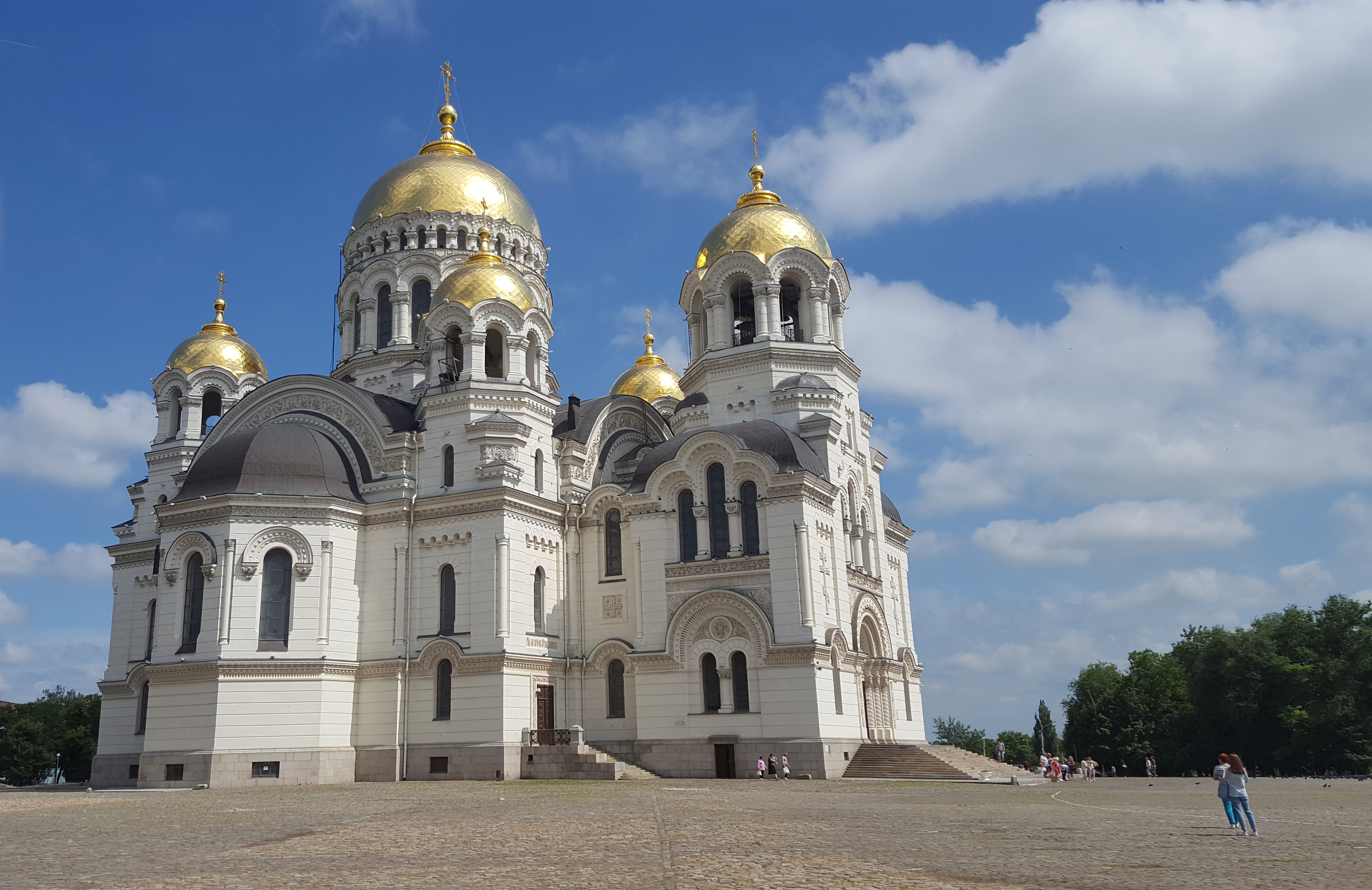
Novocherkassk Cathedral

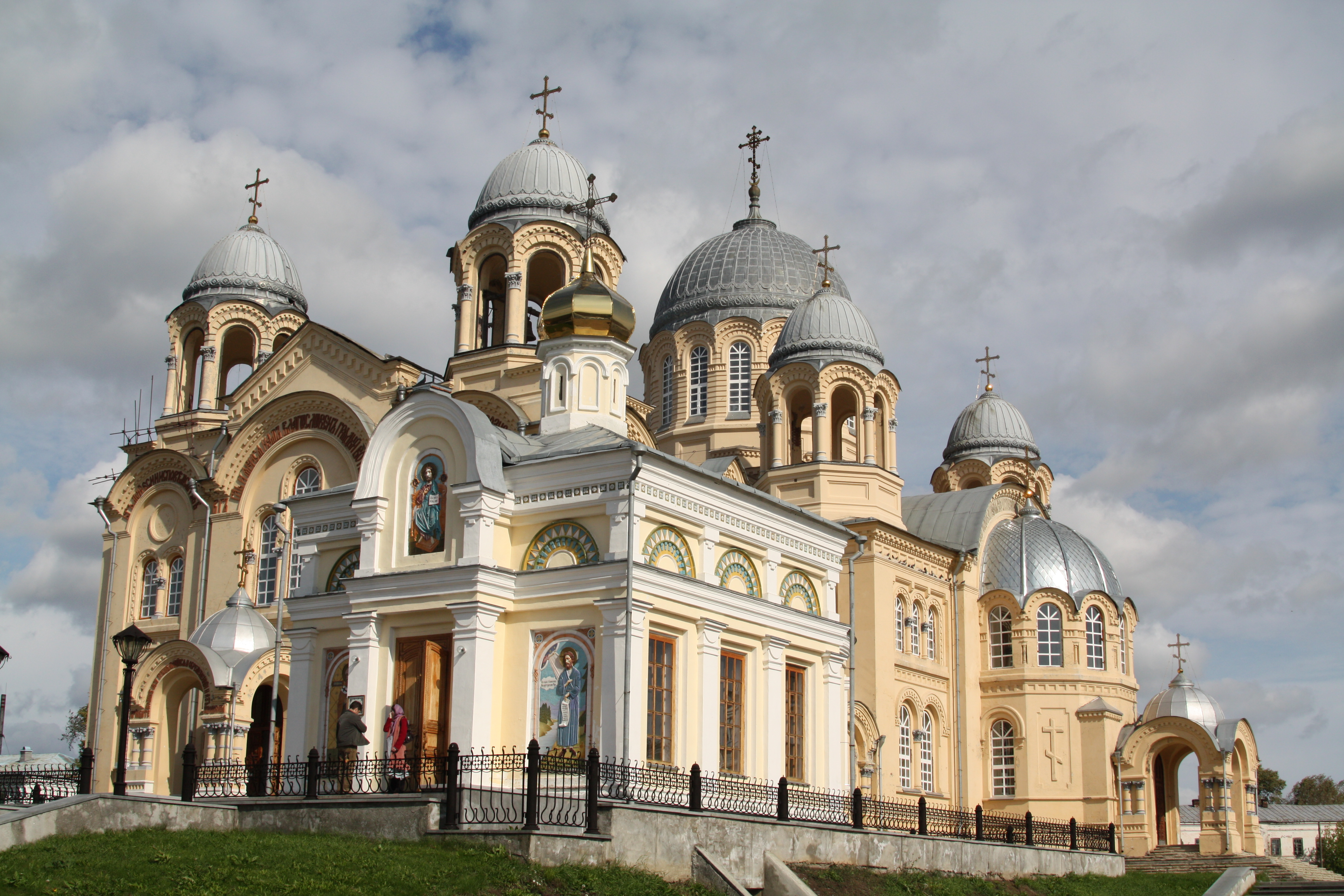
Exaltation of the Cross Cathedral at St. Nicholas Monastery, Verkhoturye

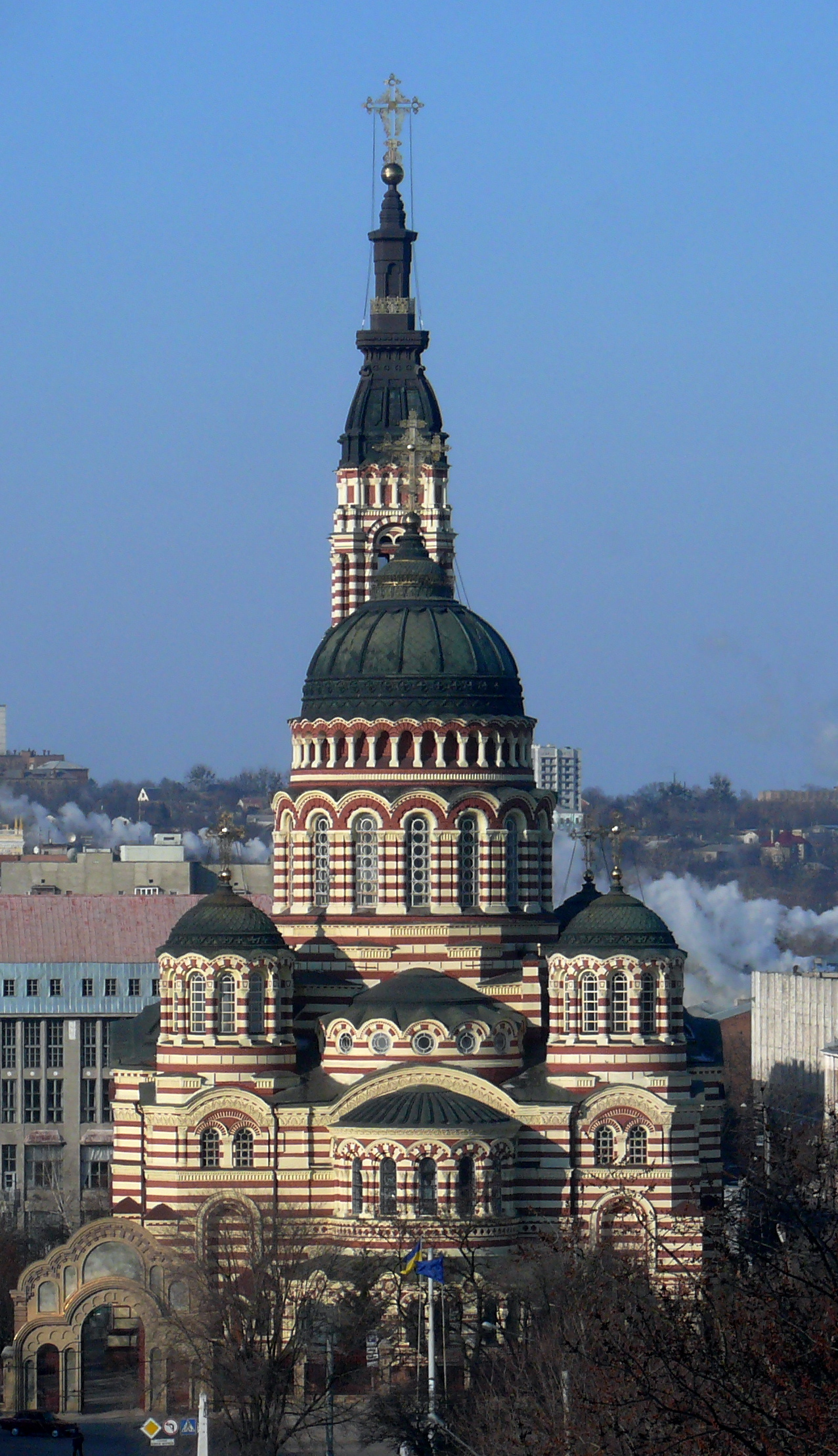
Annunciation Cathedral, Kharkiv

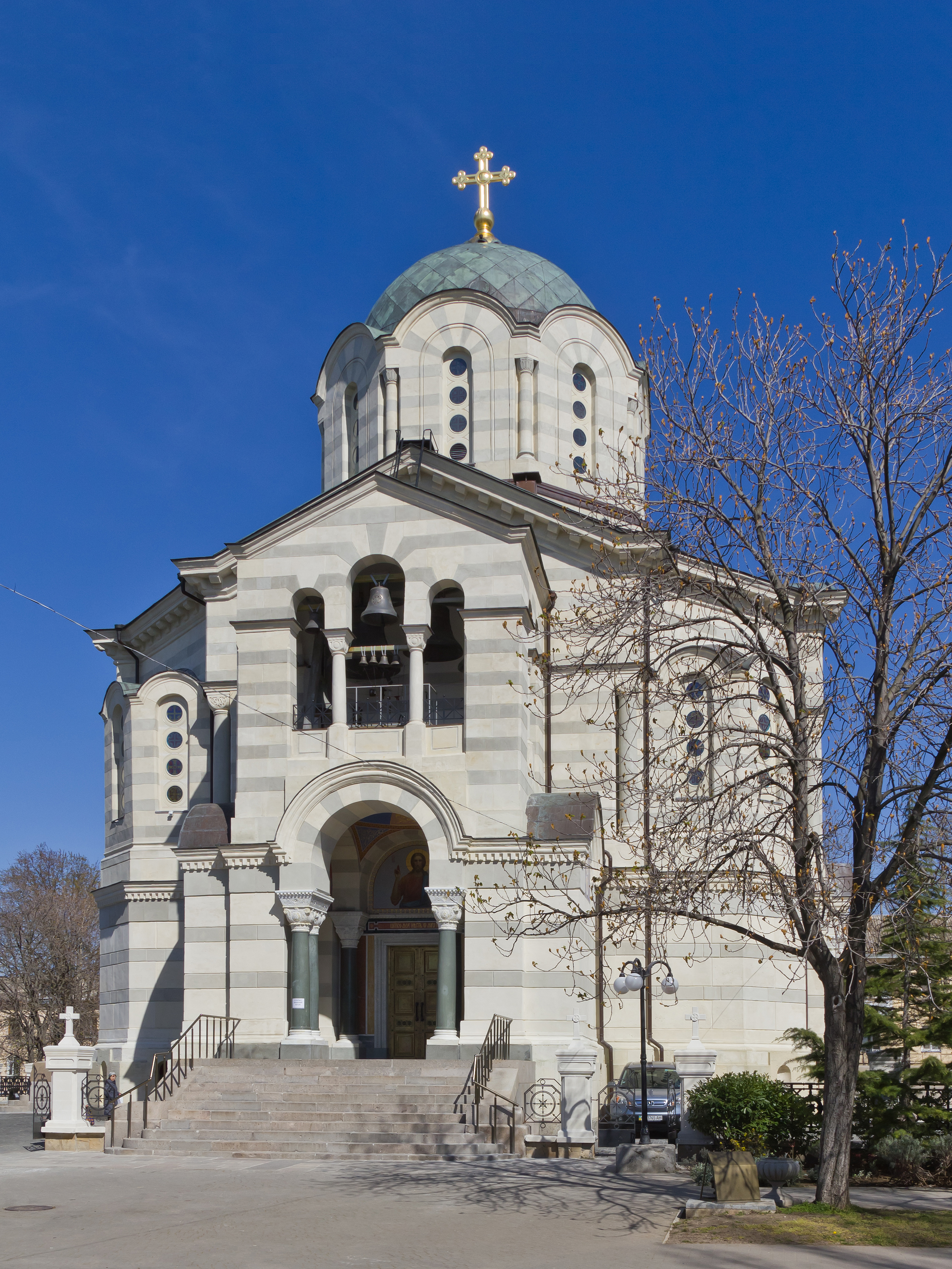
St. Vladimir's Cathedral, Sevastopol

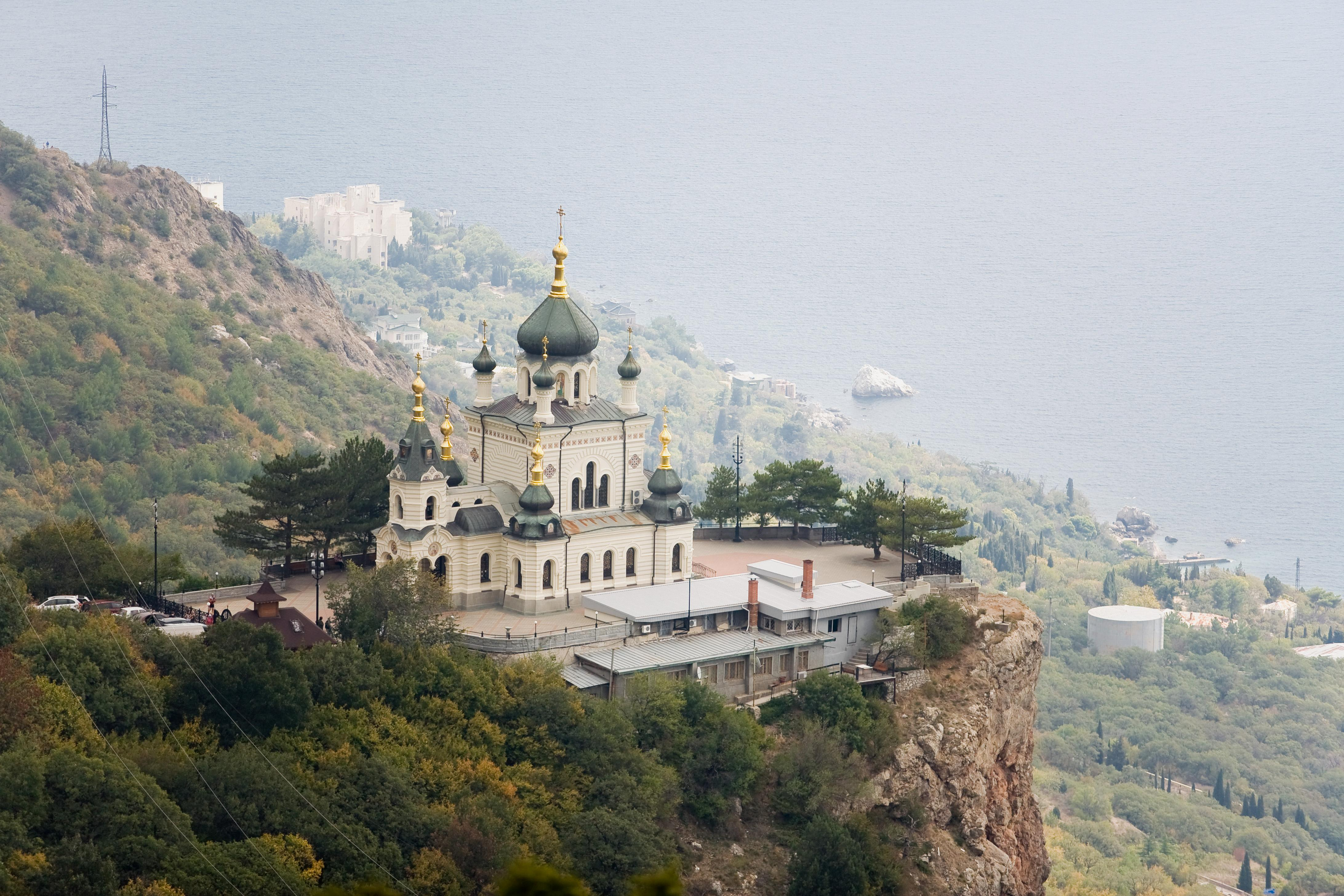
Foros Church

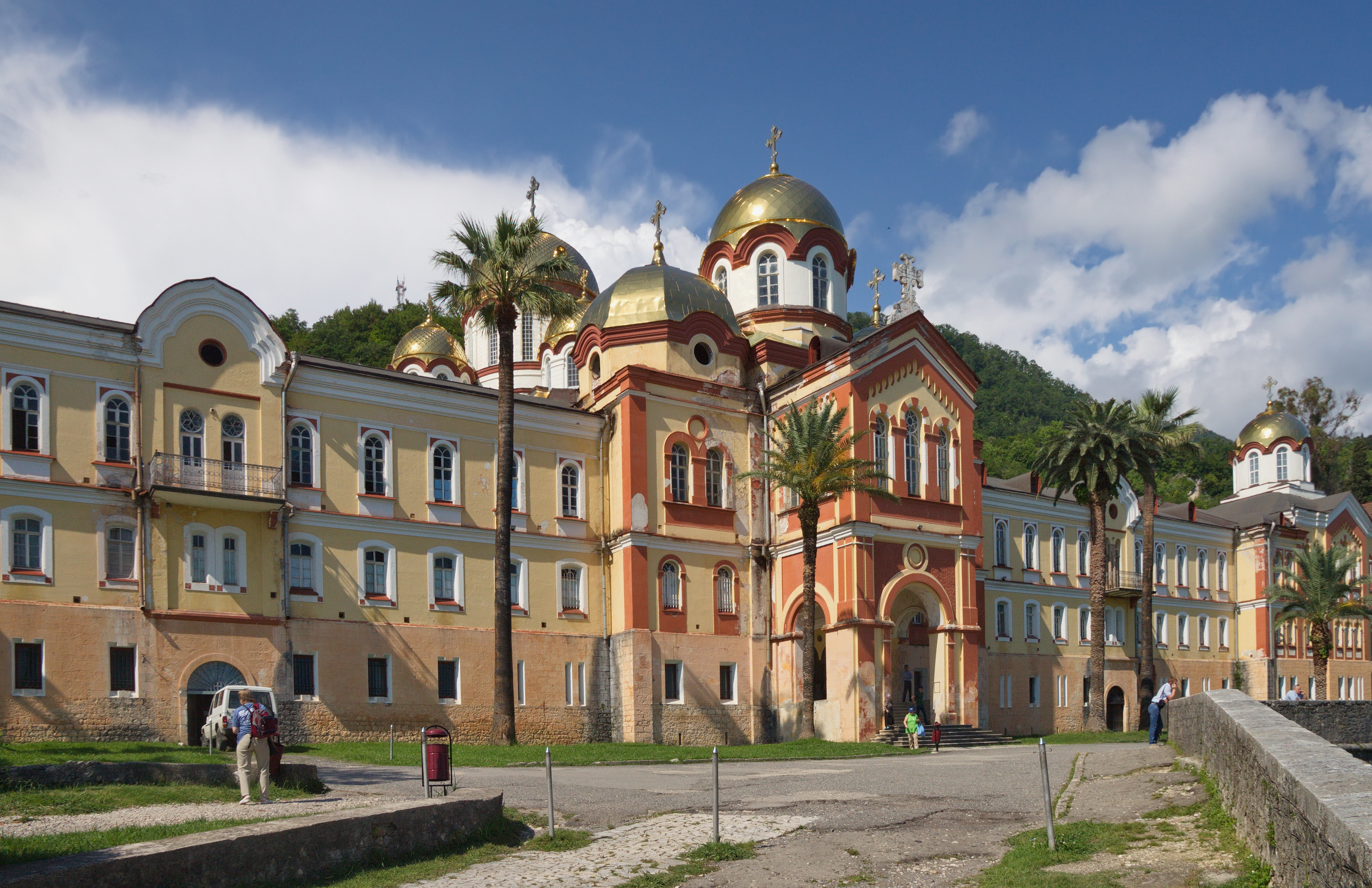
New Athos Monastery, New Afon

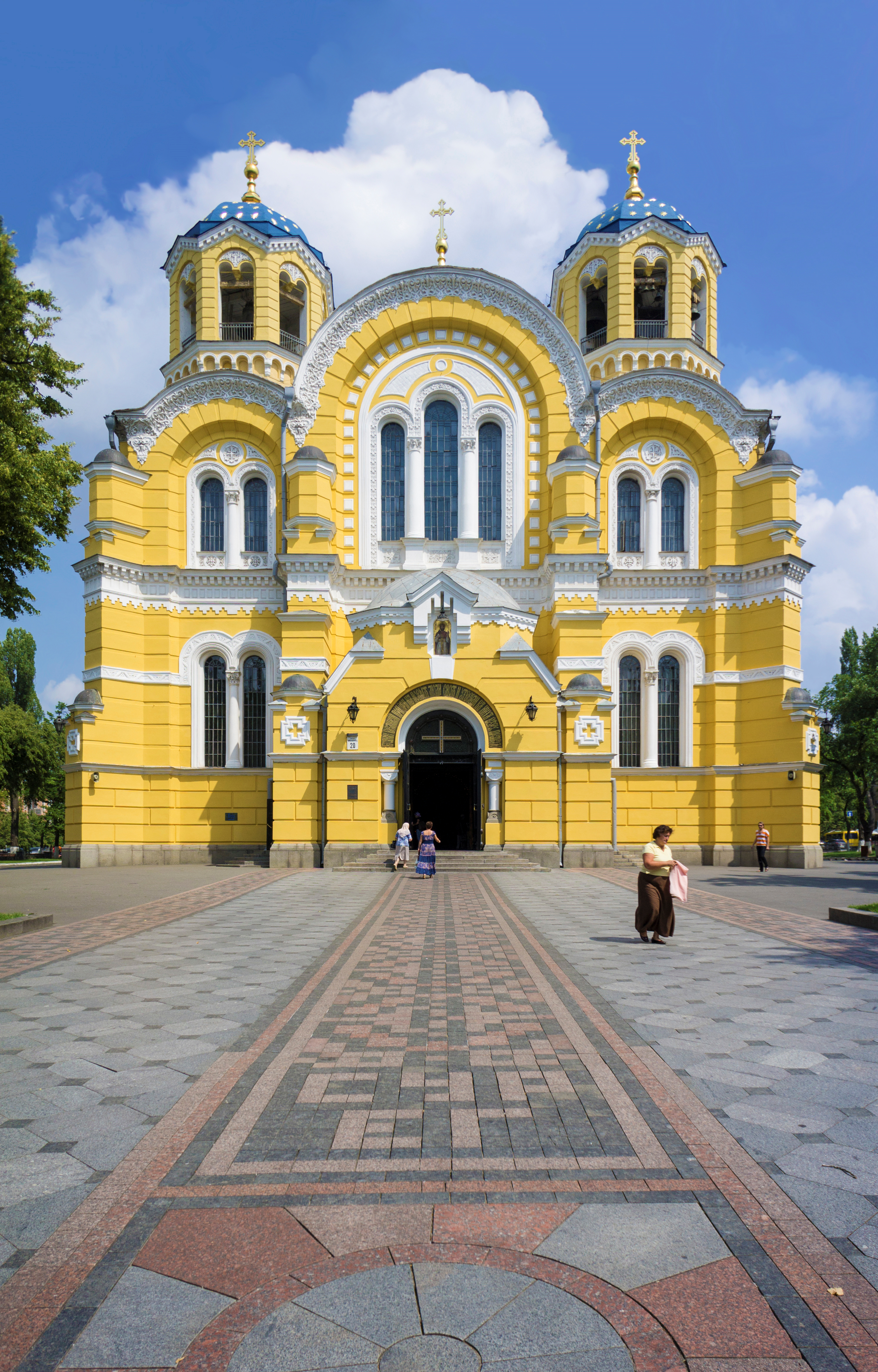
St Volodymyr's Cathedral, Kyiv

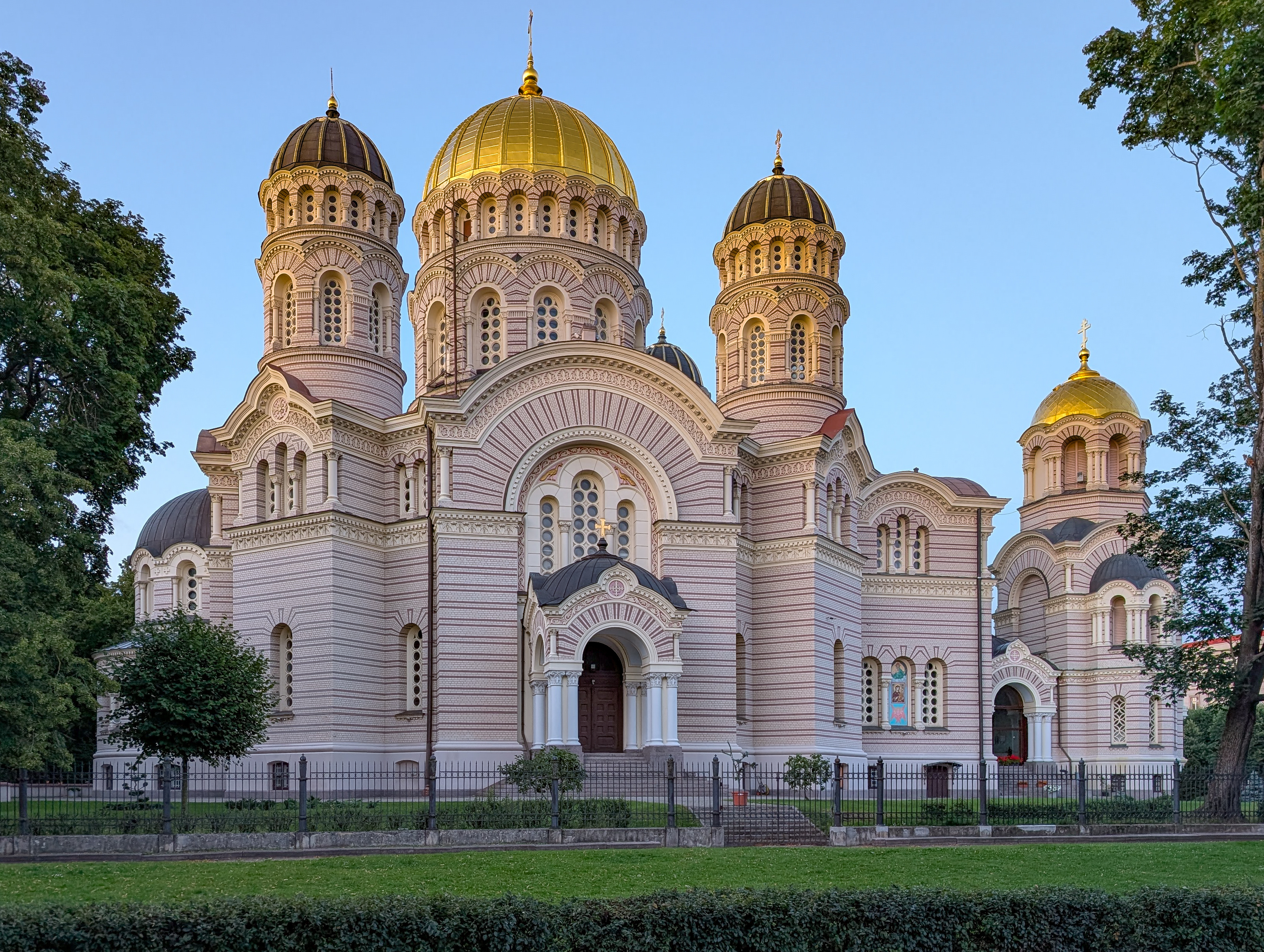
Nativity Cathedral, Riga

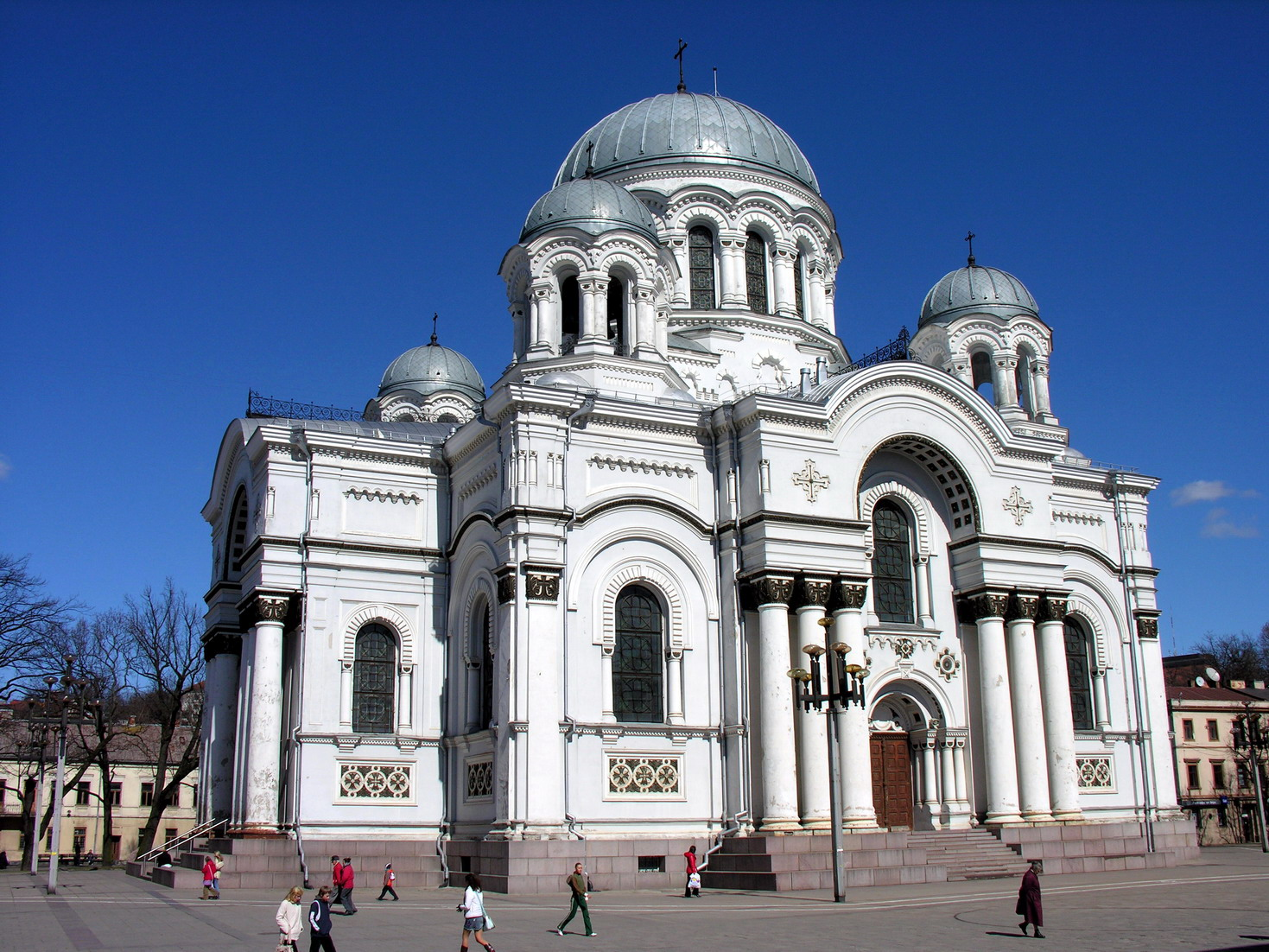
St. Michael the Archangel Church, Kaunas

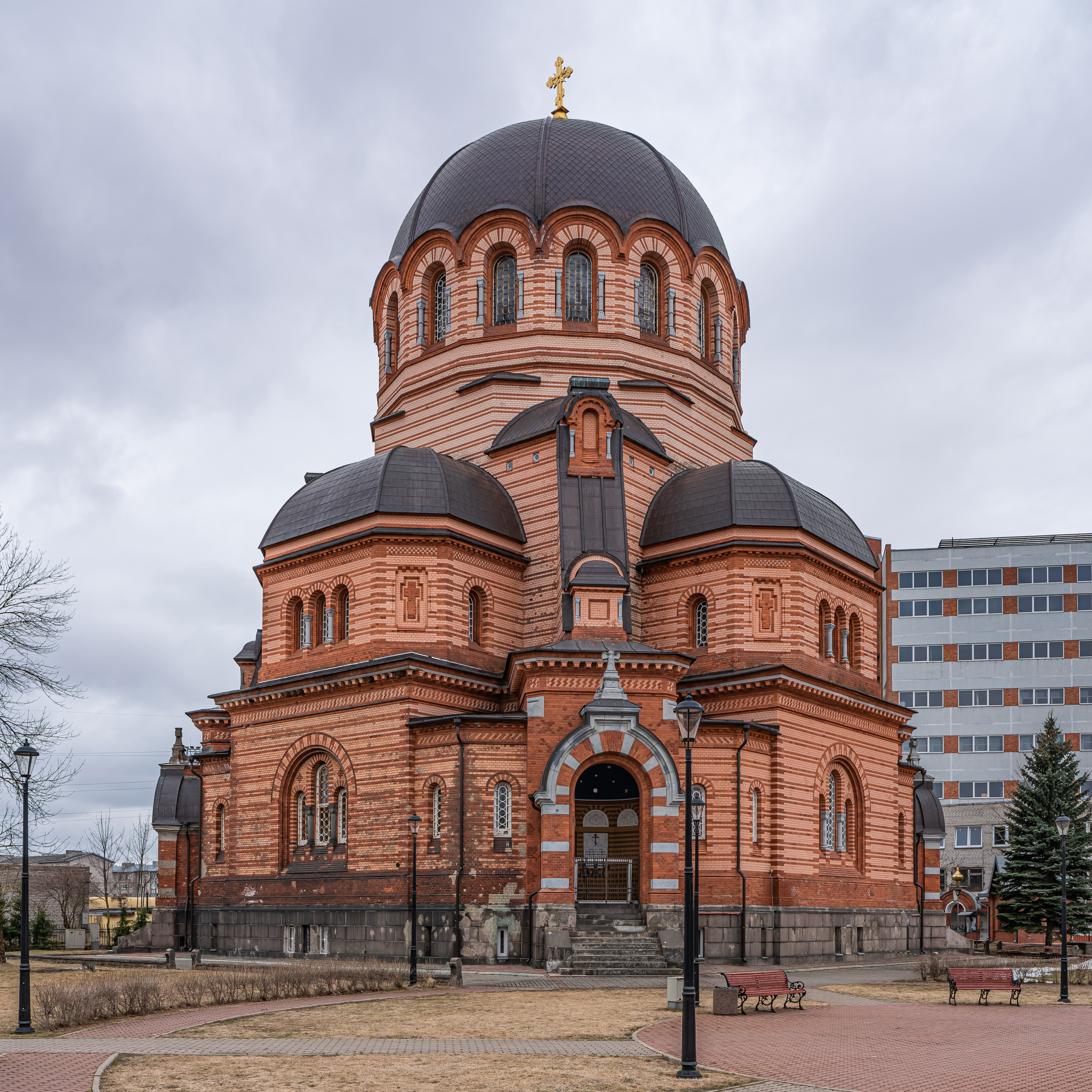
Church of the Resurrection of the Lord, Narva

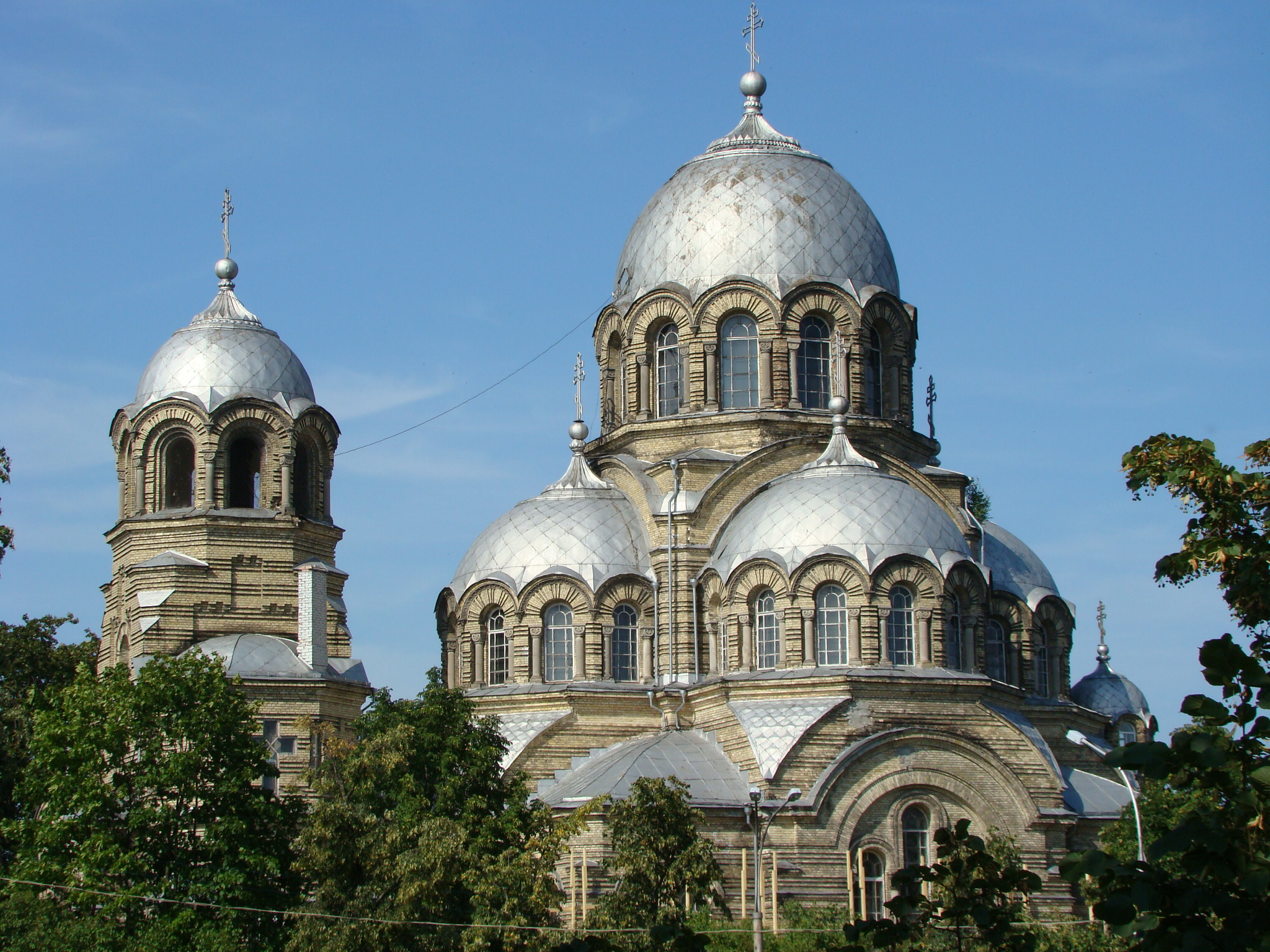
The church of the Theotokos Orans (Our Lady of the Sign), Vilnius

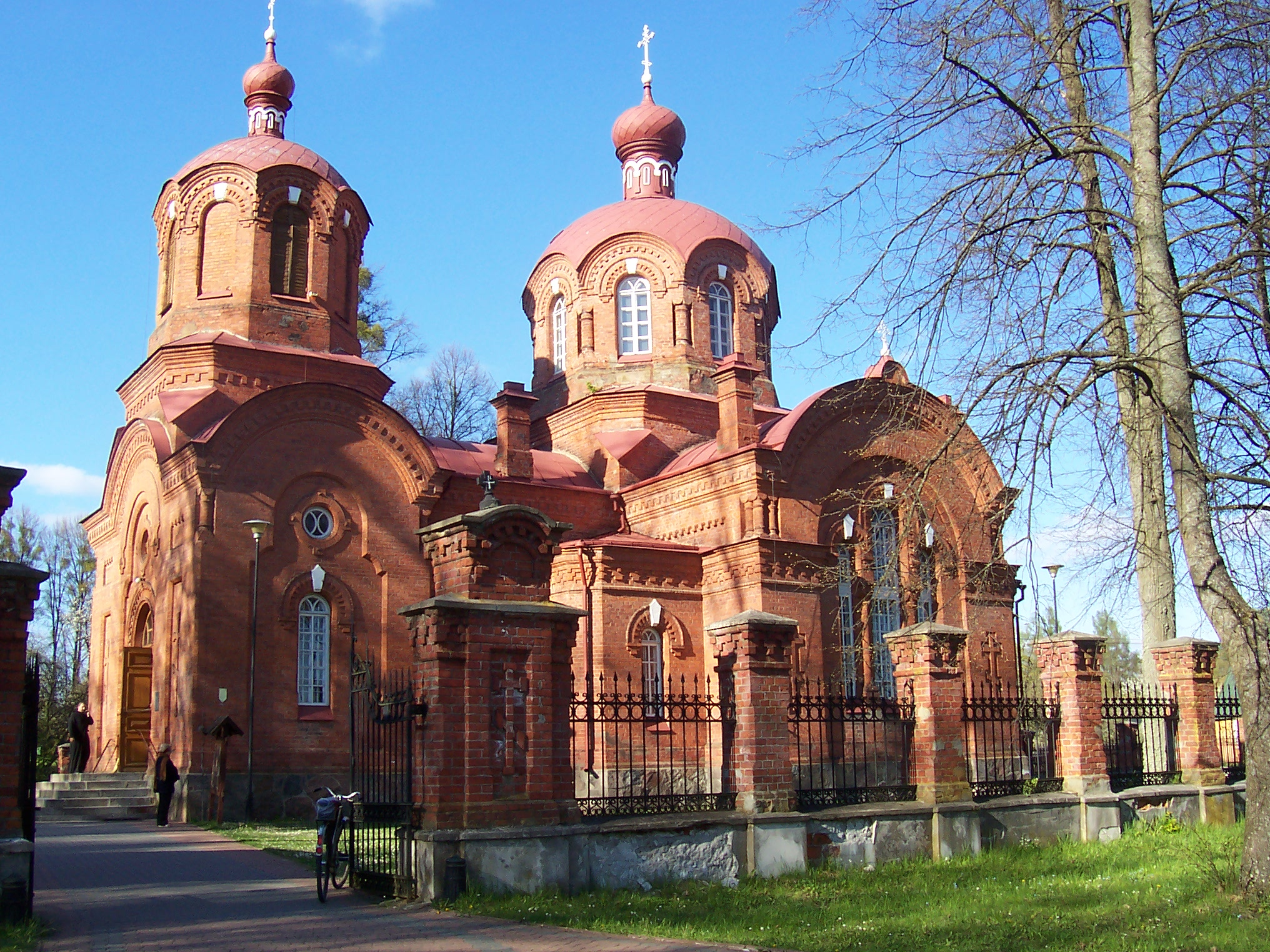
The Orthodox Church in Białowieża

Alexander Nevsky Cathedral, Łódź

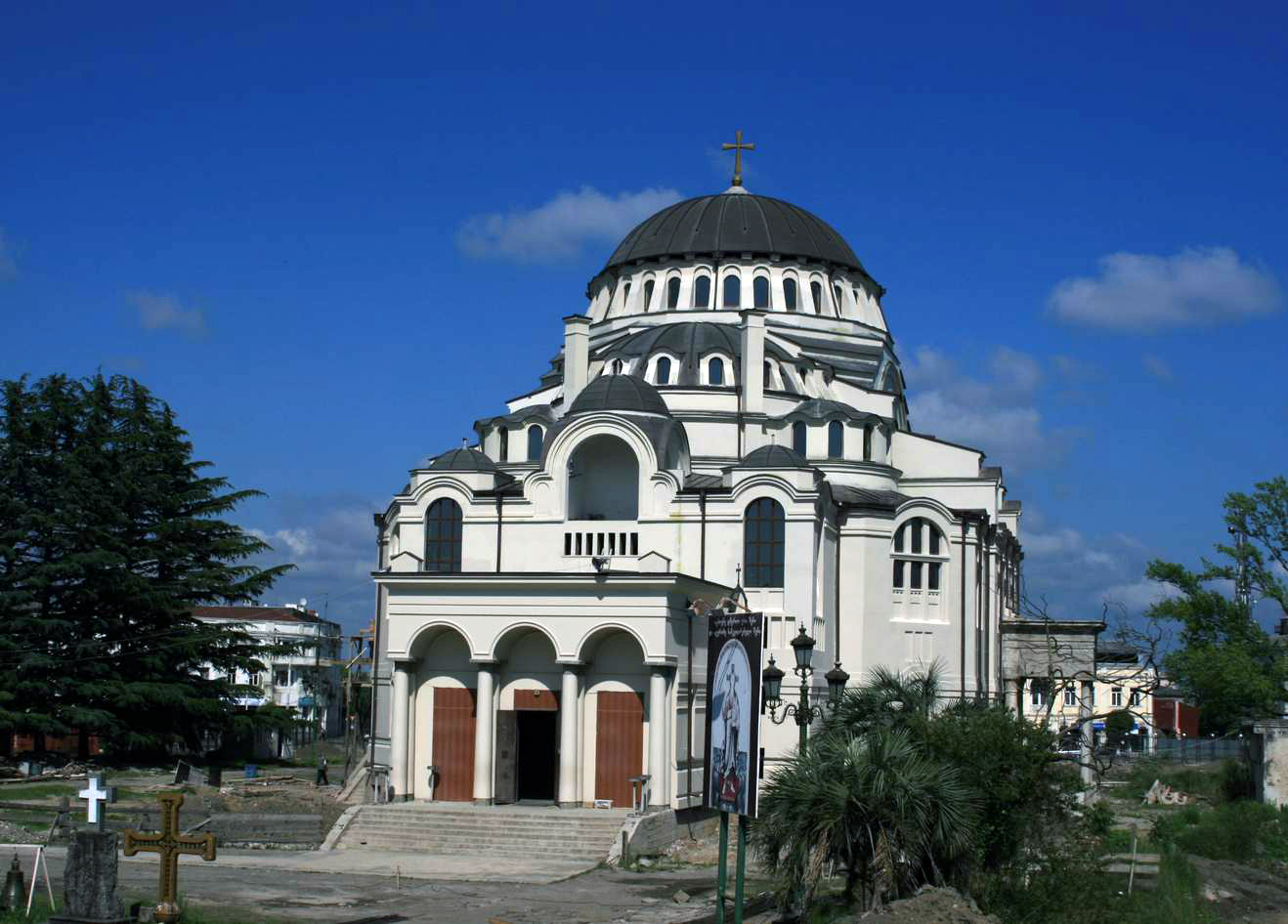
Poti Cathedral

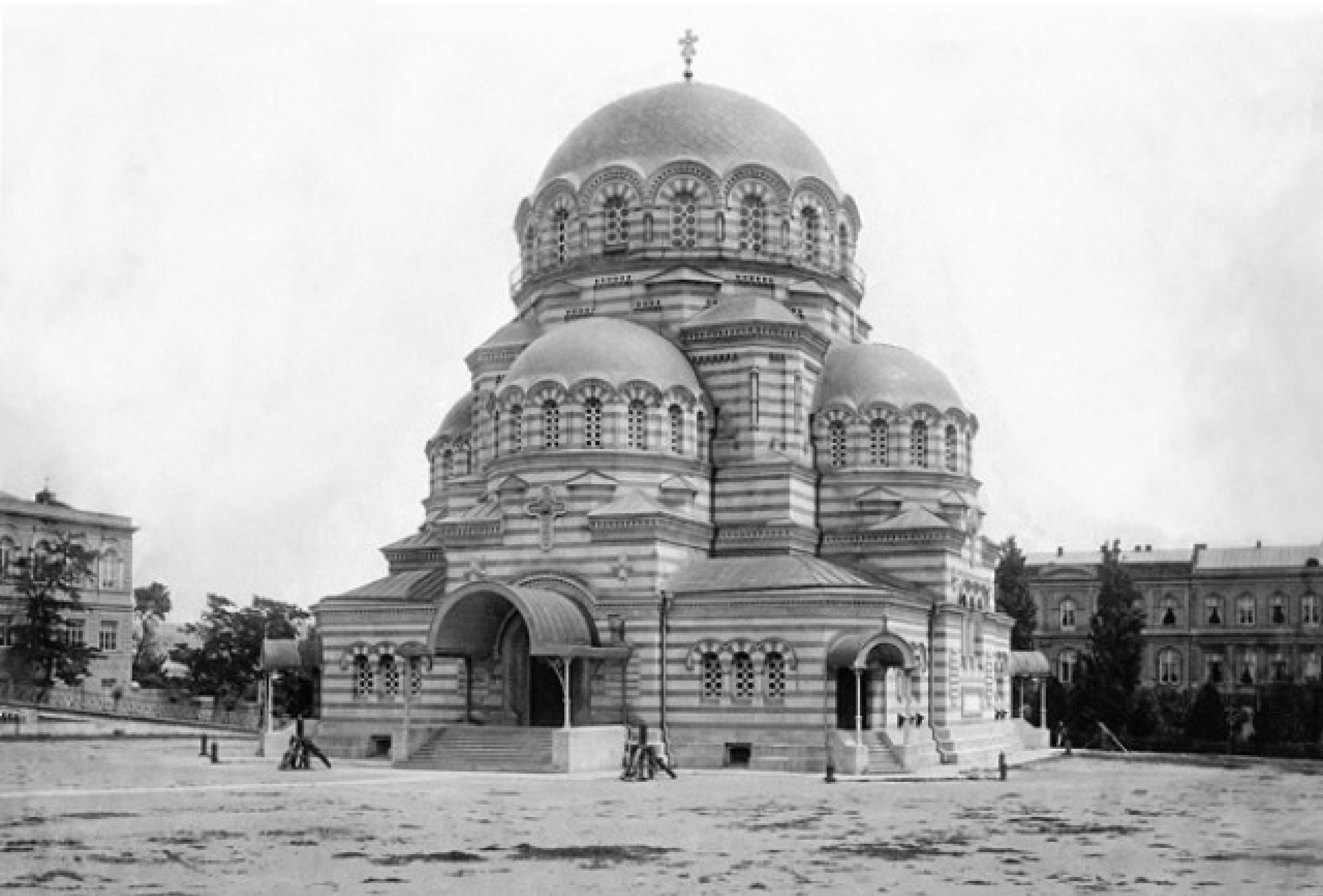
Alexander Nevsky Cathedral, Tiflis

== Bulgaria ==
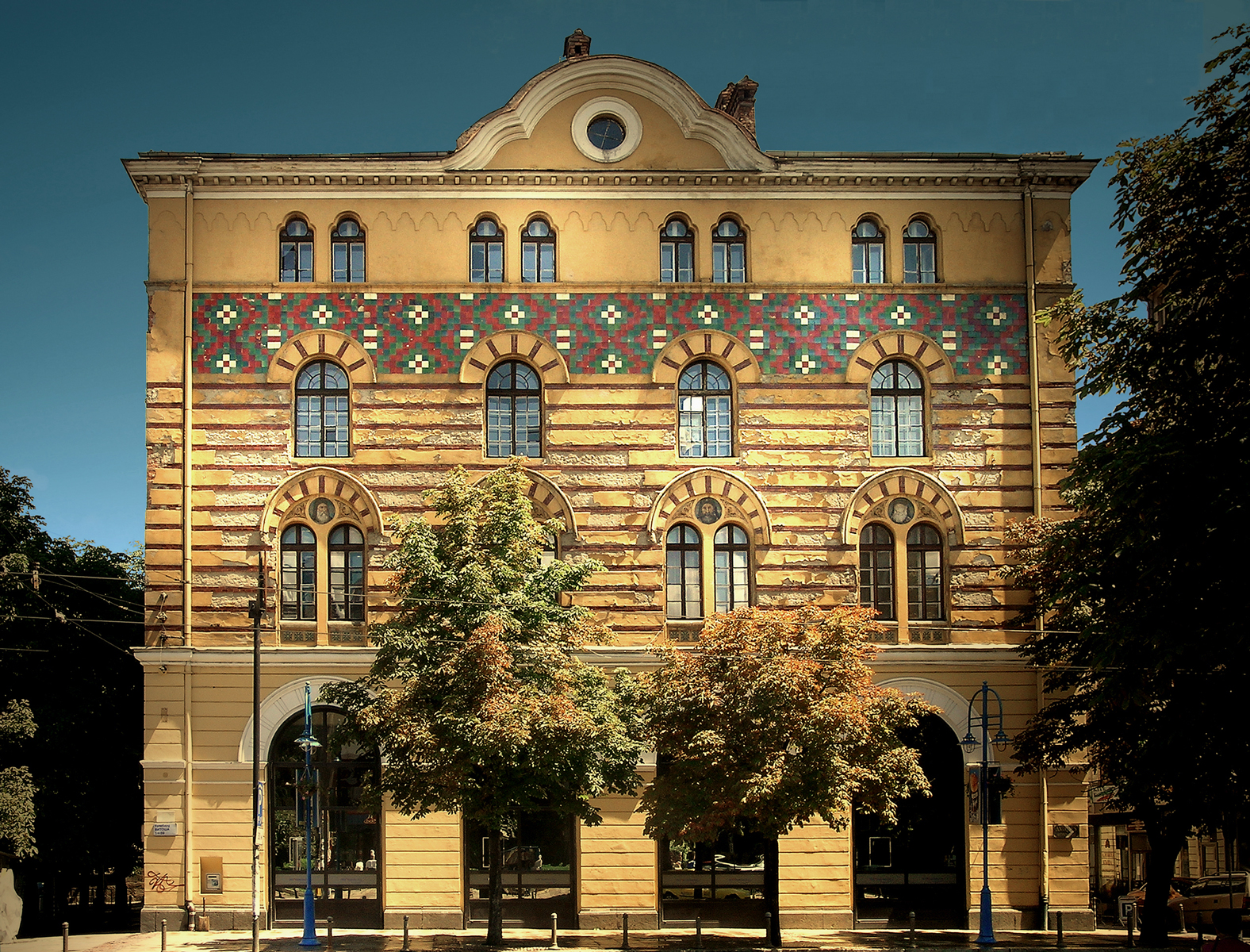
Faculty of Theology Sofia, Sofia University

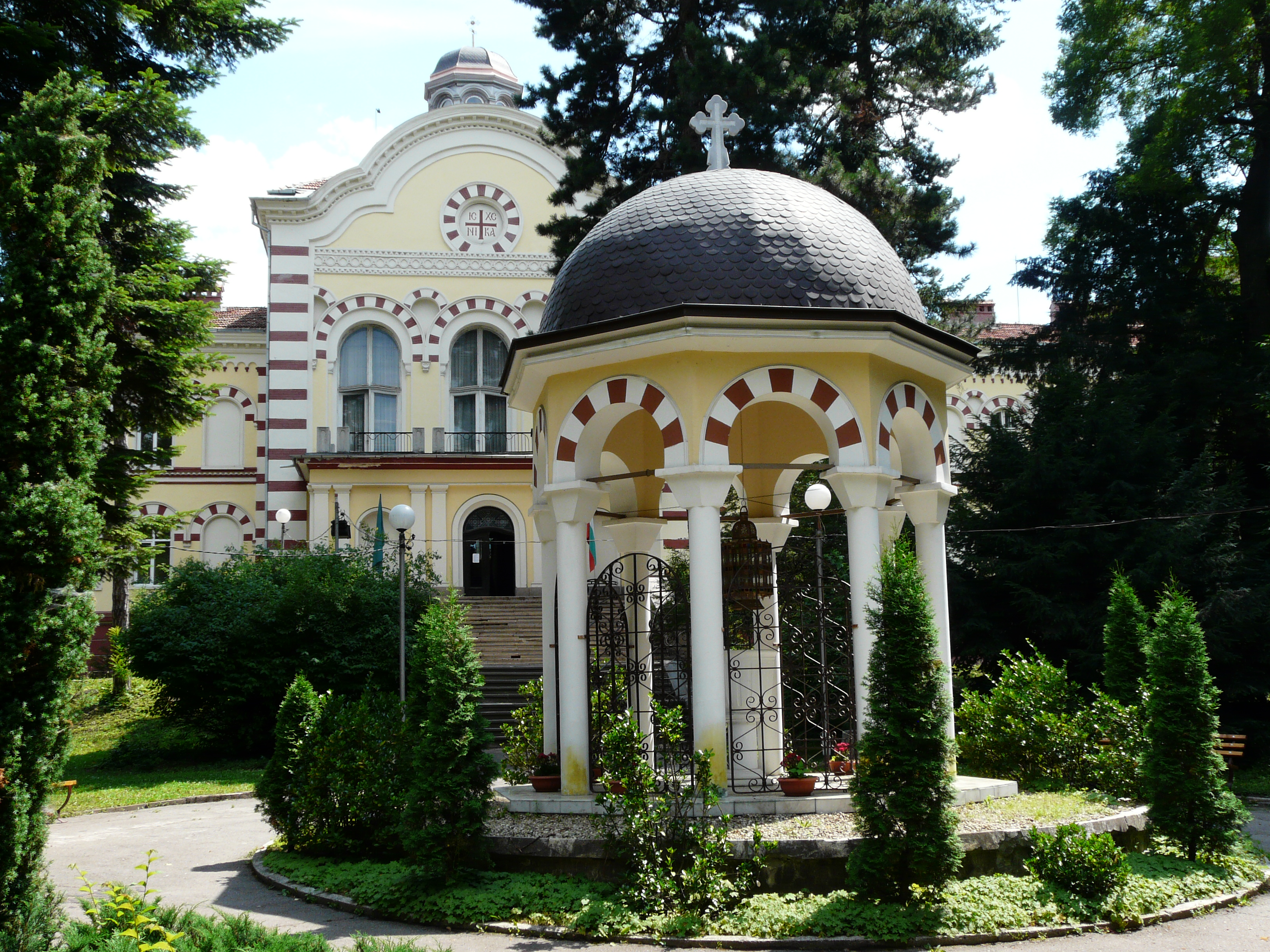
The Sofia Seminary

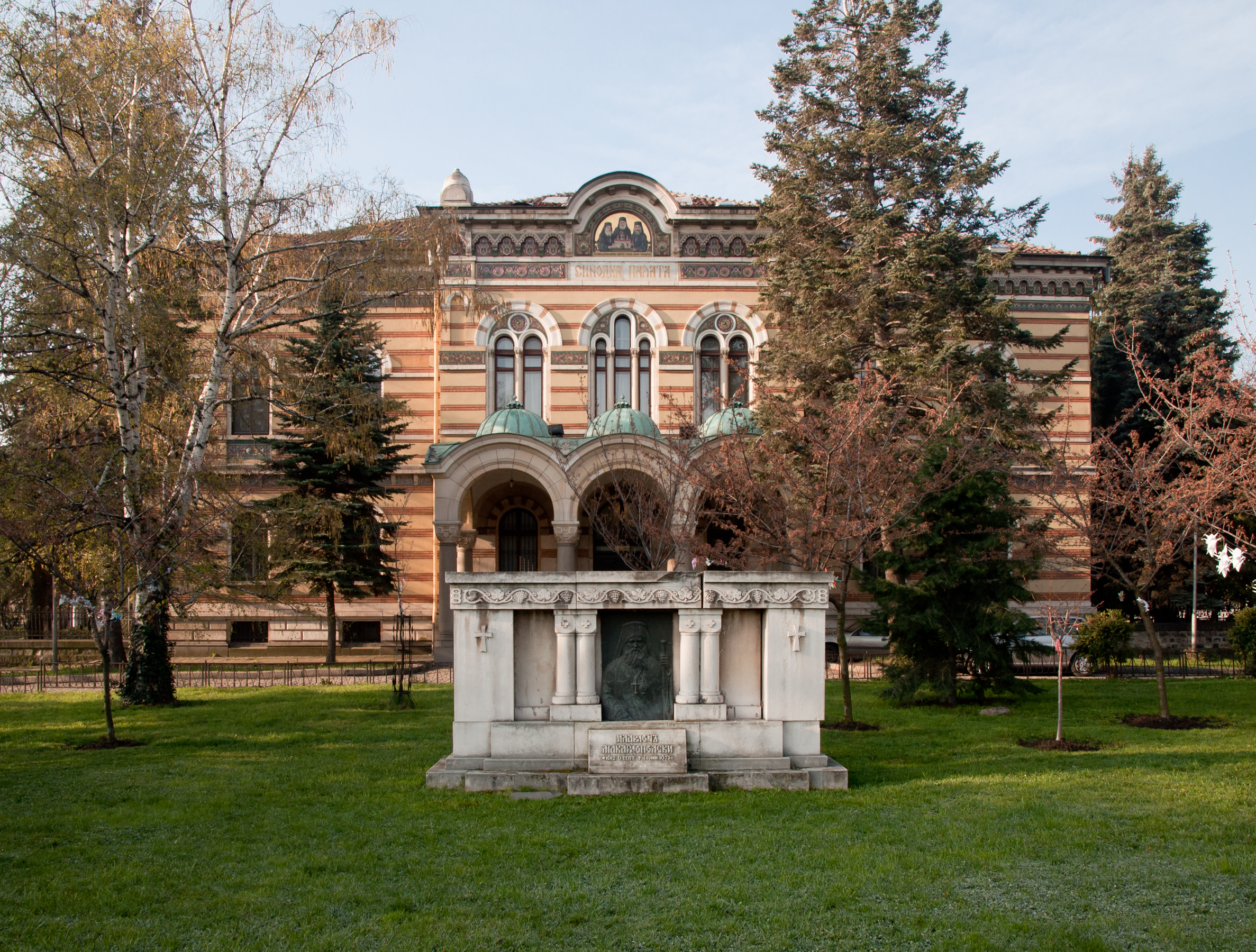
The Palace of the Holy Synod of the Bulgarian Patriarchate, Sofia

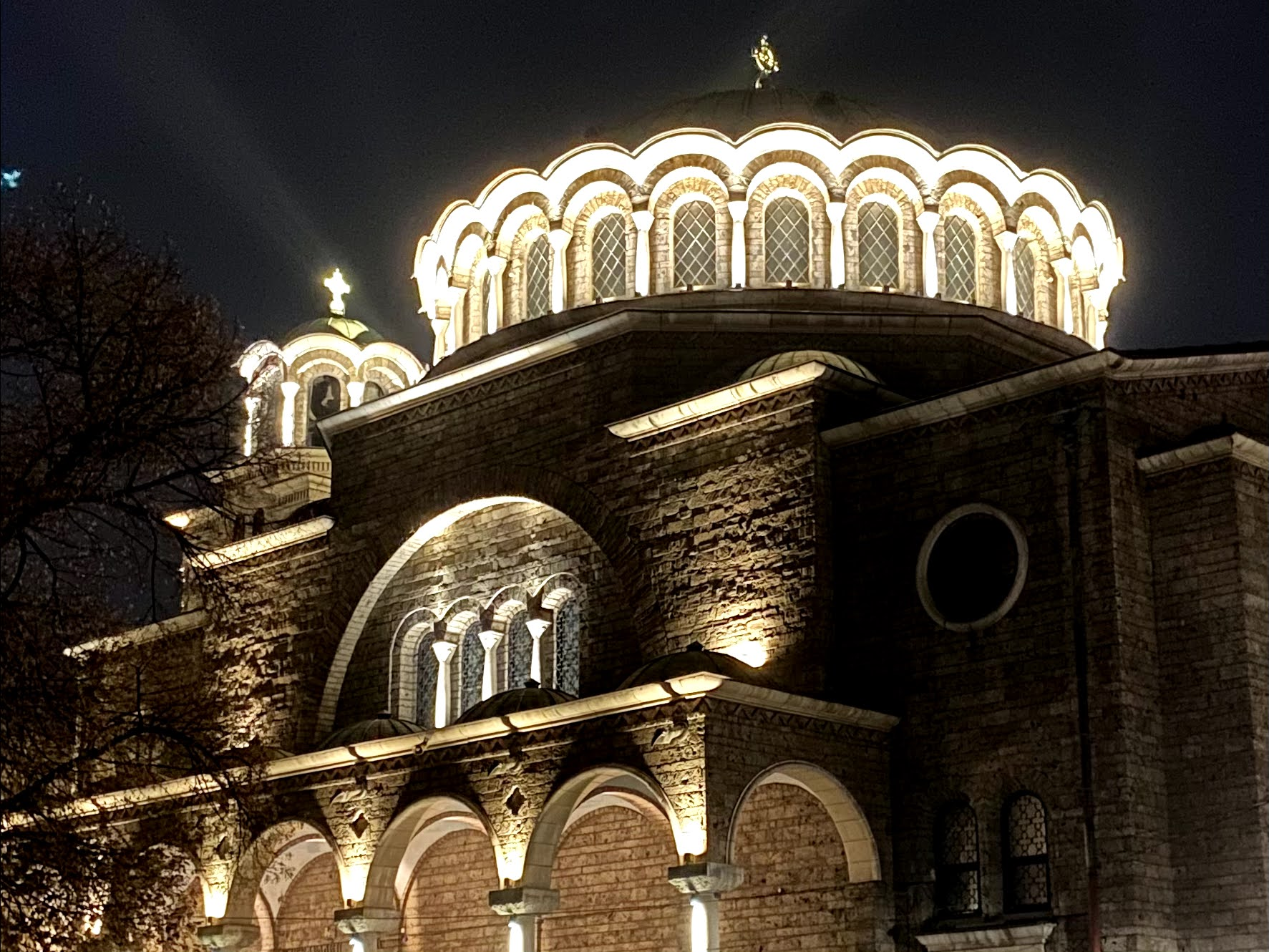
St. Nedelya Cathedral Church at night, Sofia

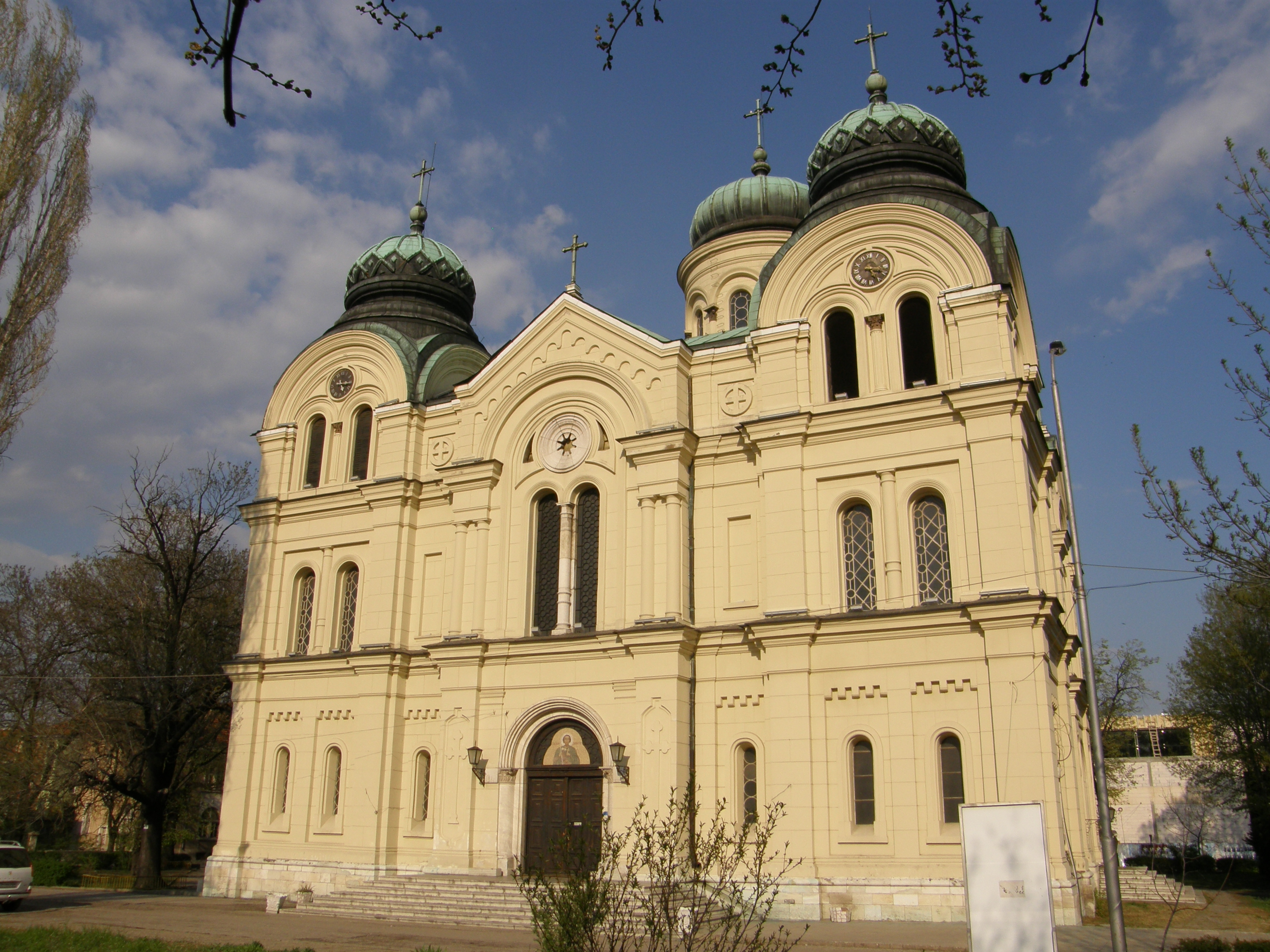
St. Demetrius Cathedral, Vidin

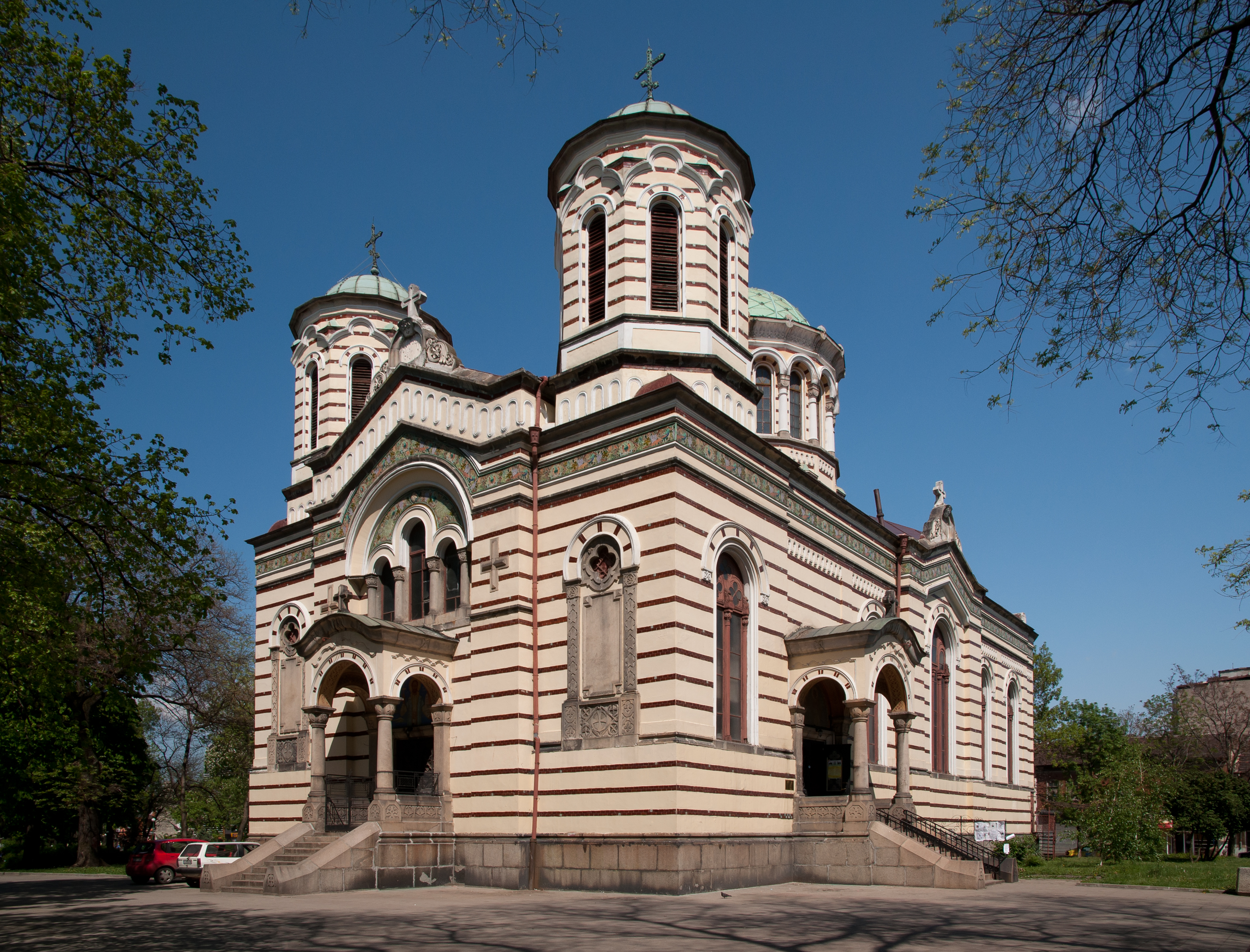
St. Nikolay of Sofia church, Sofia

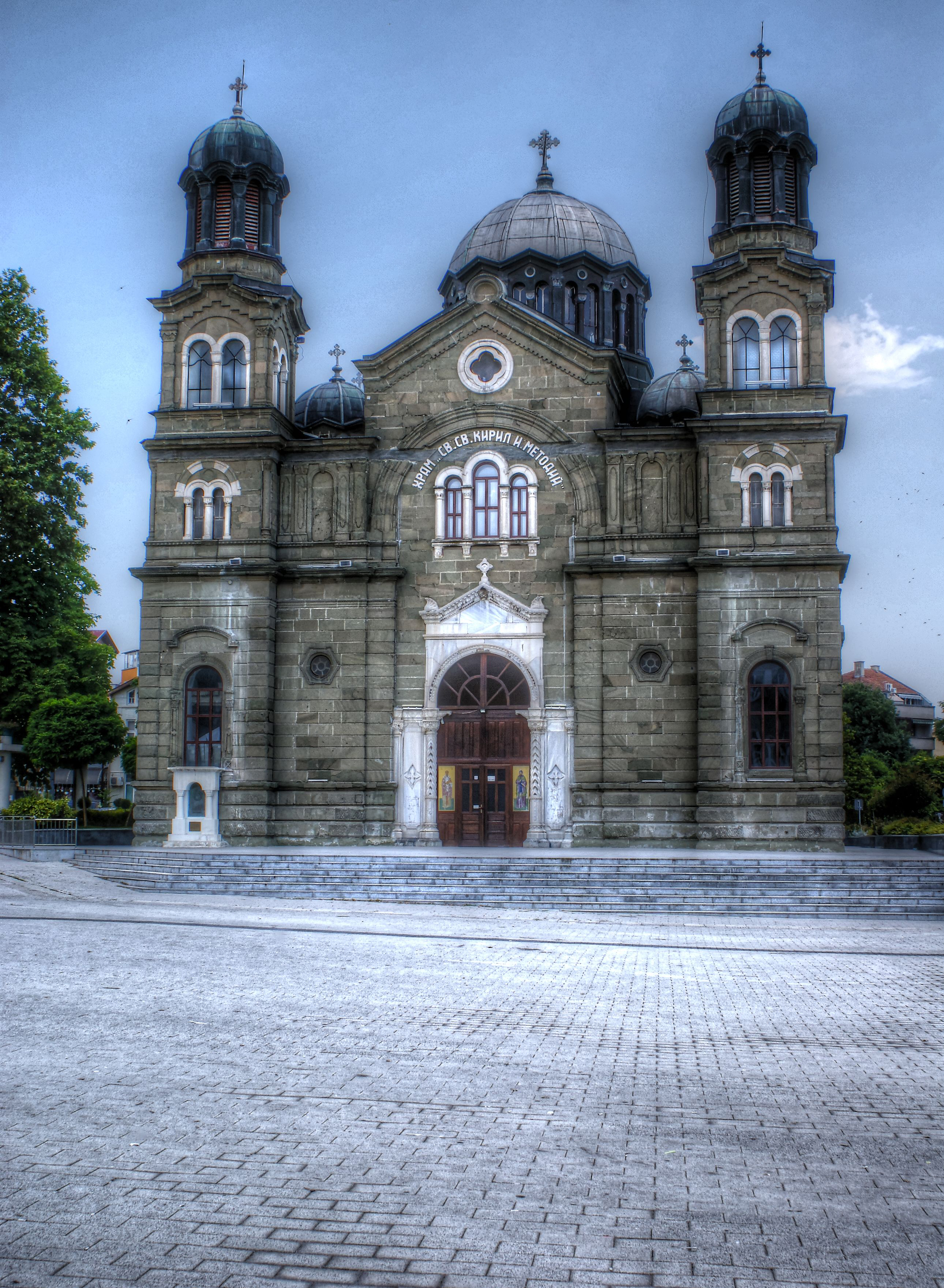
Saints Cyril and Methodius Cathedral, Burgas

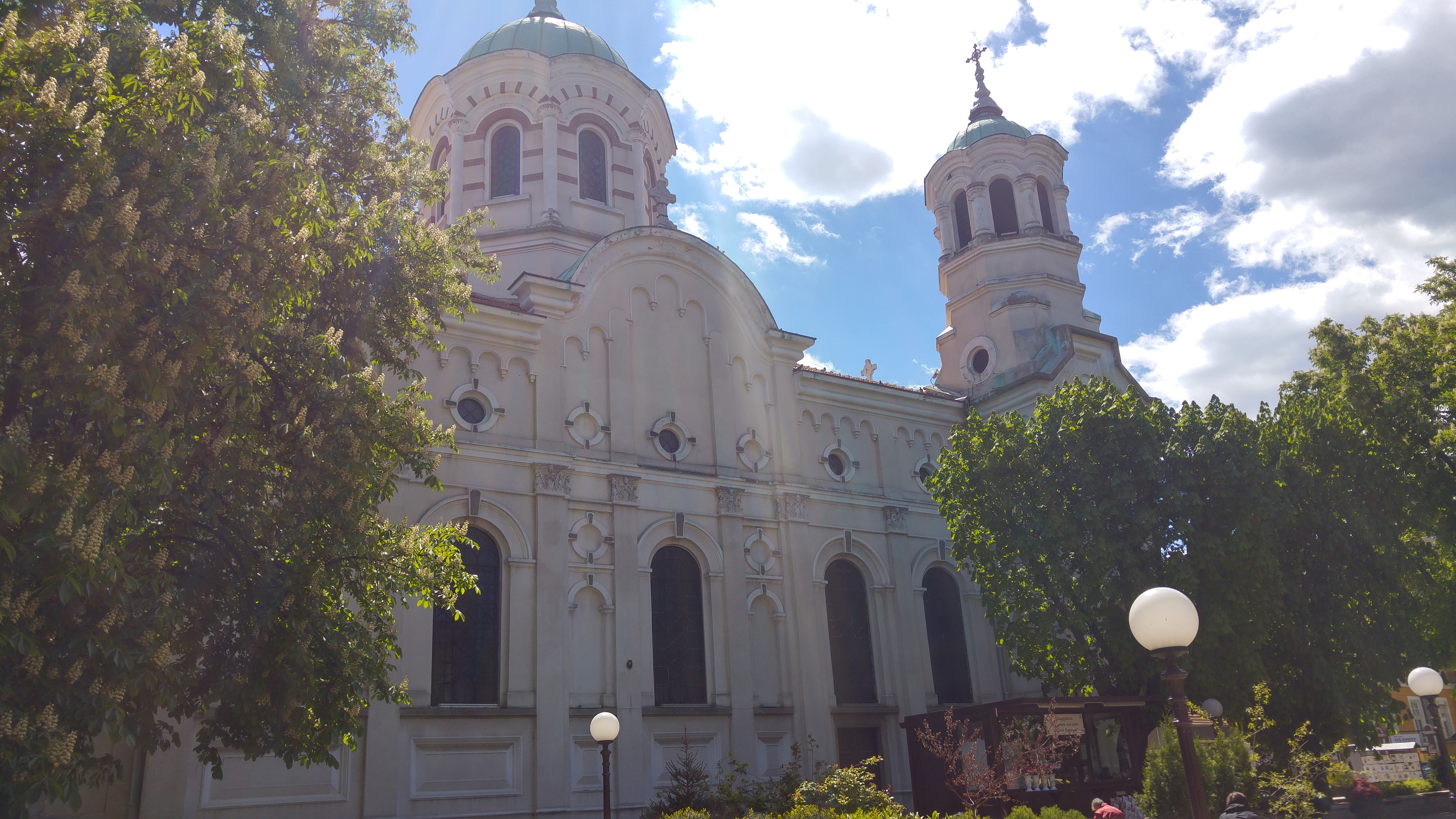
St. Nikolay the Wonderworker church, Stara Zagora

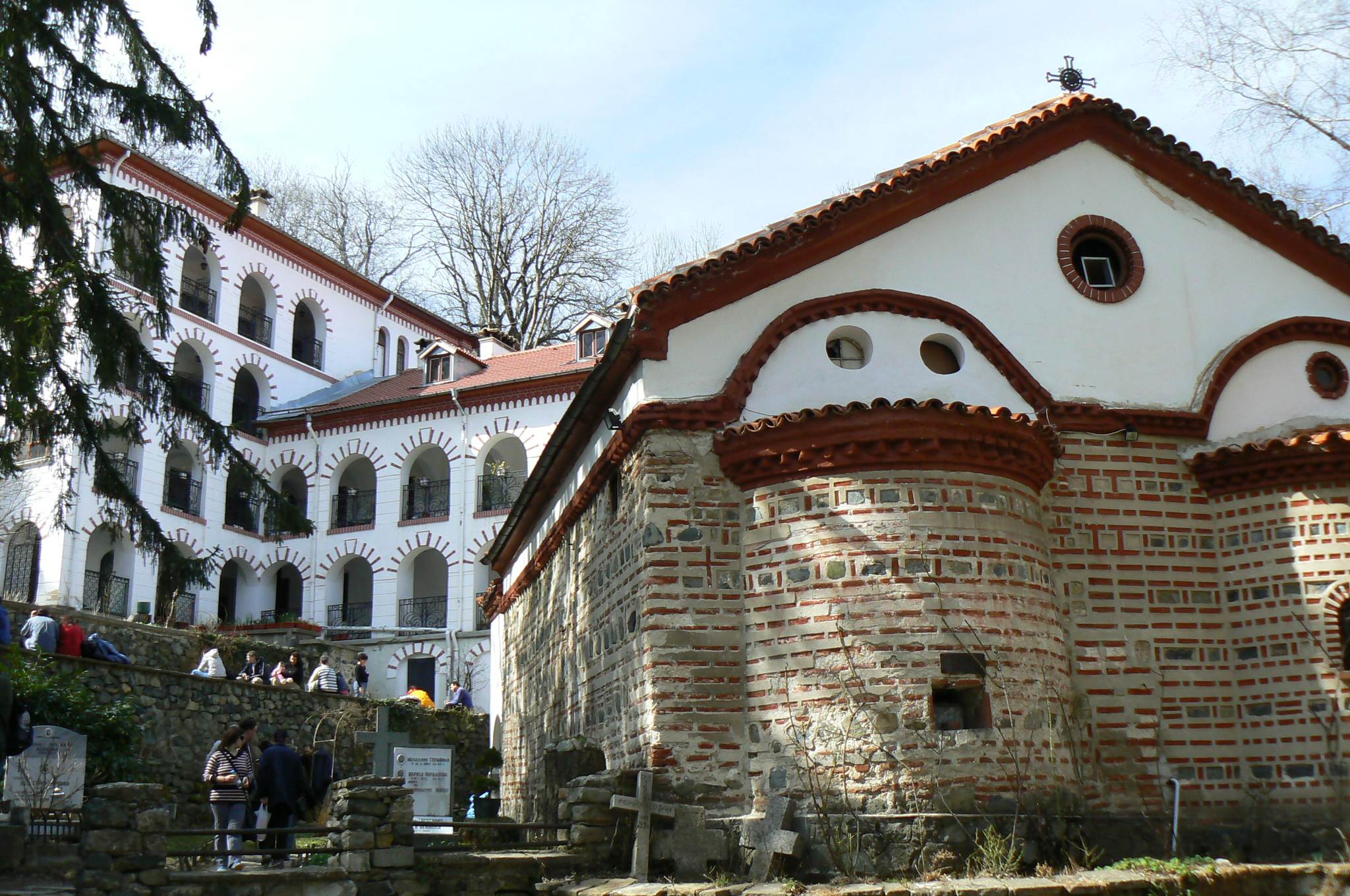
Dragalevtsi Monastery (new buildings from 1932) Sofia

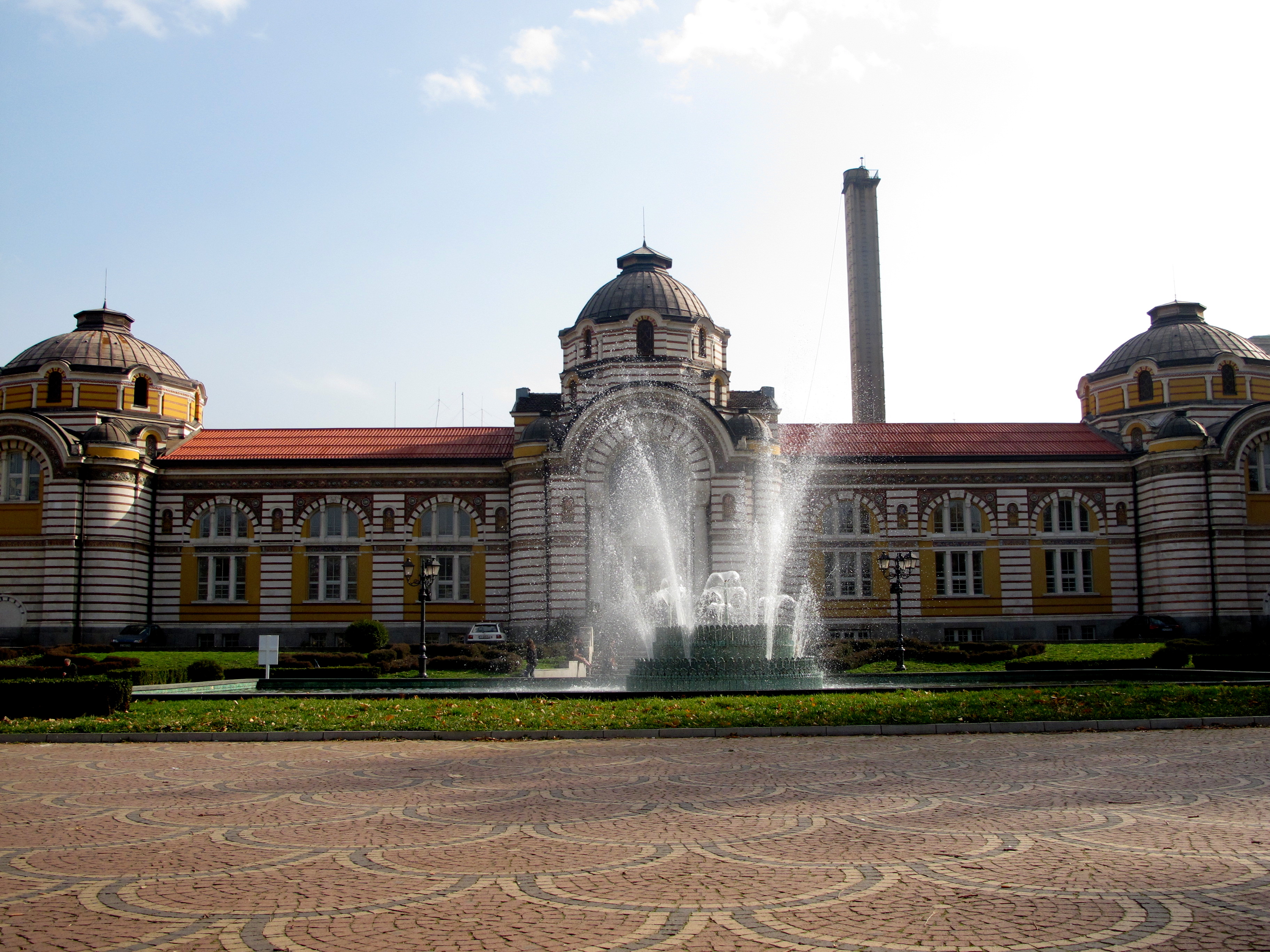
Regional History Museum Sofia (former Sofia Central Public Mineral Baths)

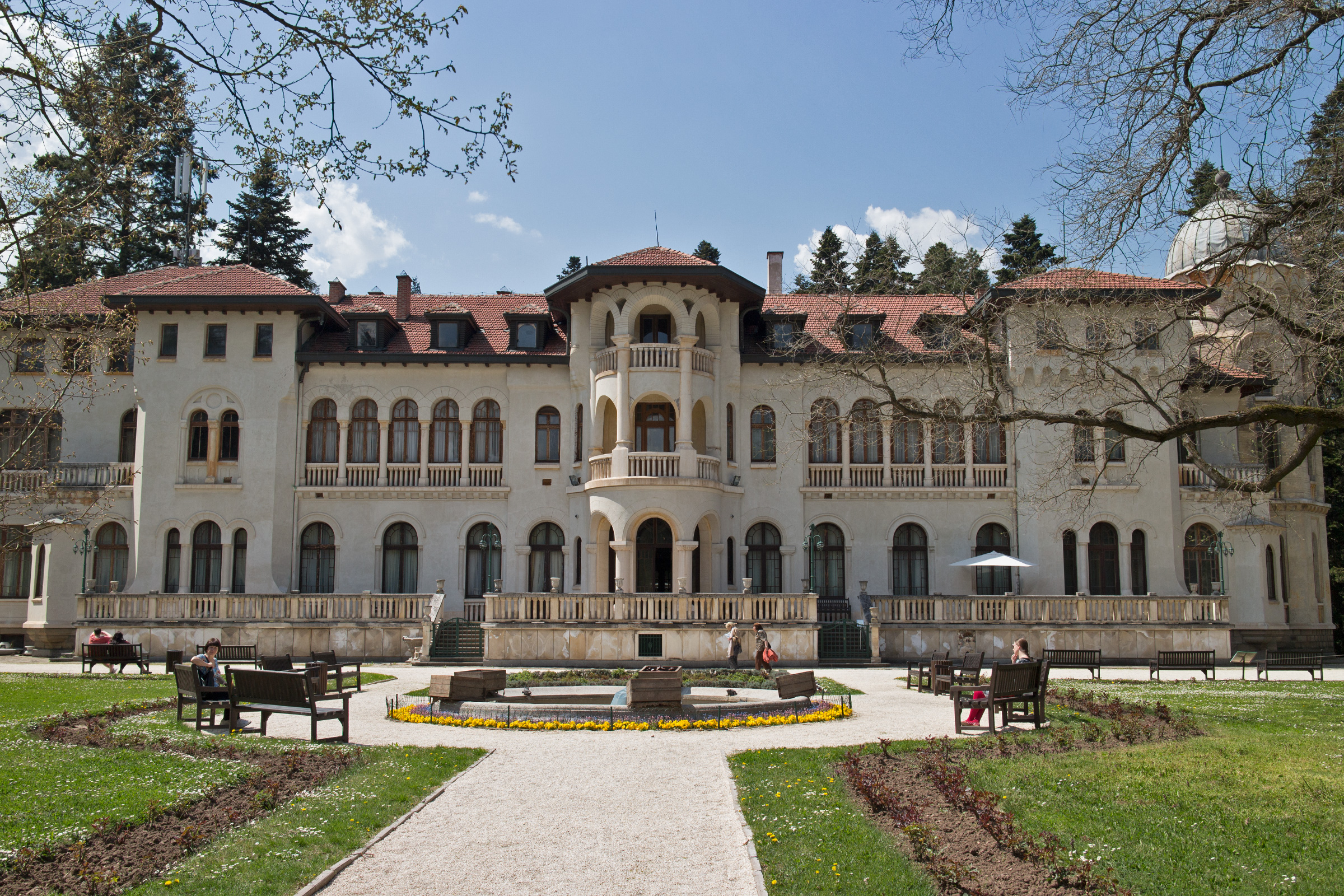
The building of the New Palace in Vrana Palace, Sofia

The Bulgarian Neo-Byzantine style from the end of the 19th and the beginning of the 20th century is often a combination of Byzantine, typical Bulgarian, Eastern Orthodox and Secession/ Art Nouveau/ Modernisme elements.

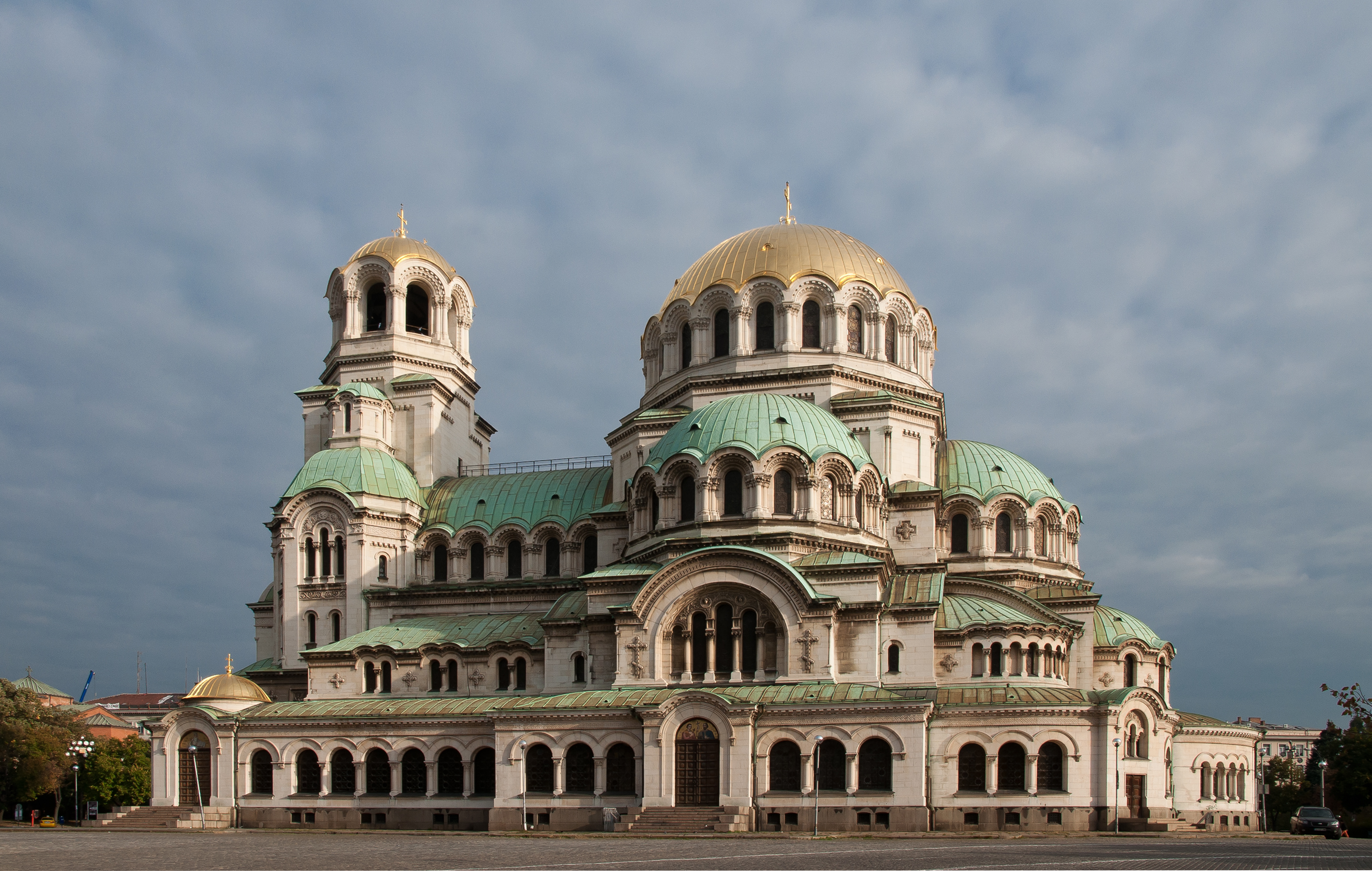
- Saint Alexander Nevsky Cathedral, Sofia, Bulgaria.
  Saint Alexander Nevsky Cathedral, Sofia (1882–1912)
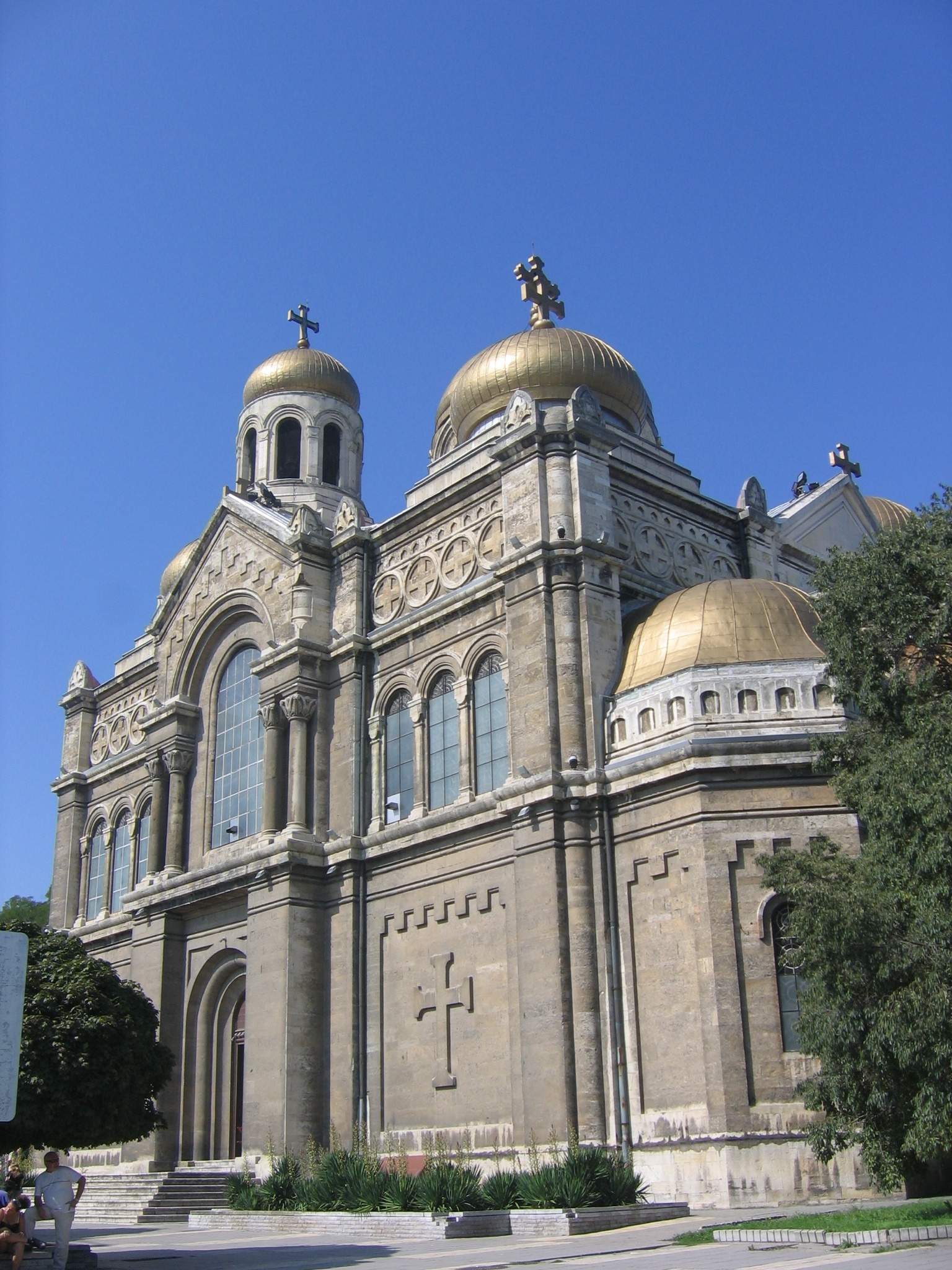
- Dormition of the Mother of God Cathedral, Varna, Bulgaria
  Dormition of the Mother of God Cathedral, Varna (1882–1885);
- Faculty of Theology (Sofia University) (1908–1912)
- Regional History Museum Sofia, former Sofia Central Public Mineral Baths (1913) – the building was designed in the Vienna Secession style, but integrating typically Byzantine, Bulgarian and Eastern Orthodox ornamental elements;
- Sofia Theological Seminary (1902–1914);
- Vrana Palace – the building of the New Palace in "Vrana" is a two-storey massive building, executed in typical Bulgarian style with Secession elements, combined in an elegant Neo-Byzantine spirit.
- Church of St Paraskeva, Sofia (1926–1930)
- St. Nedelya Cathedral Church (10th century, 1933), Sofia

== Greece ==
- Cathedral of Saint Andrew, Patras (1908–1974)
- Church of St. Panteleimon of Acharnai, Athens (1910–1930)

== Romania ==
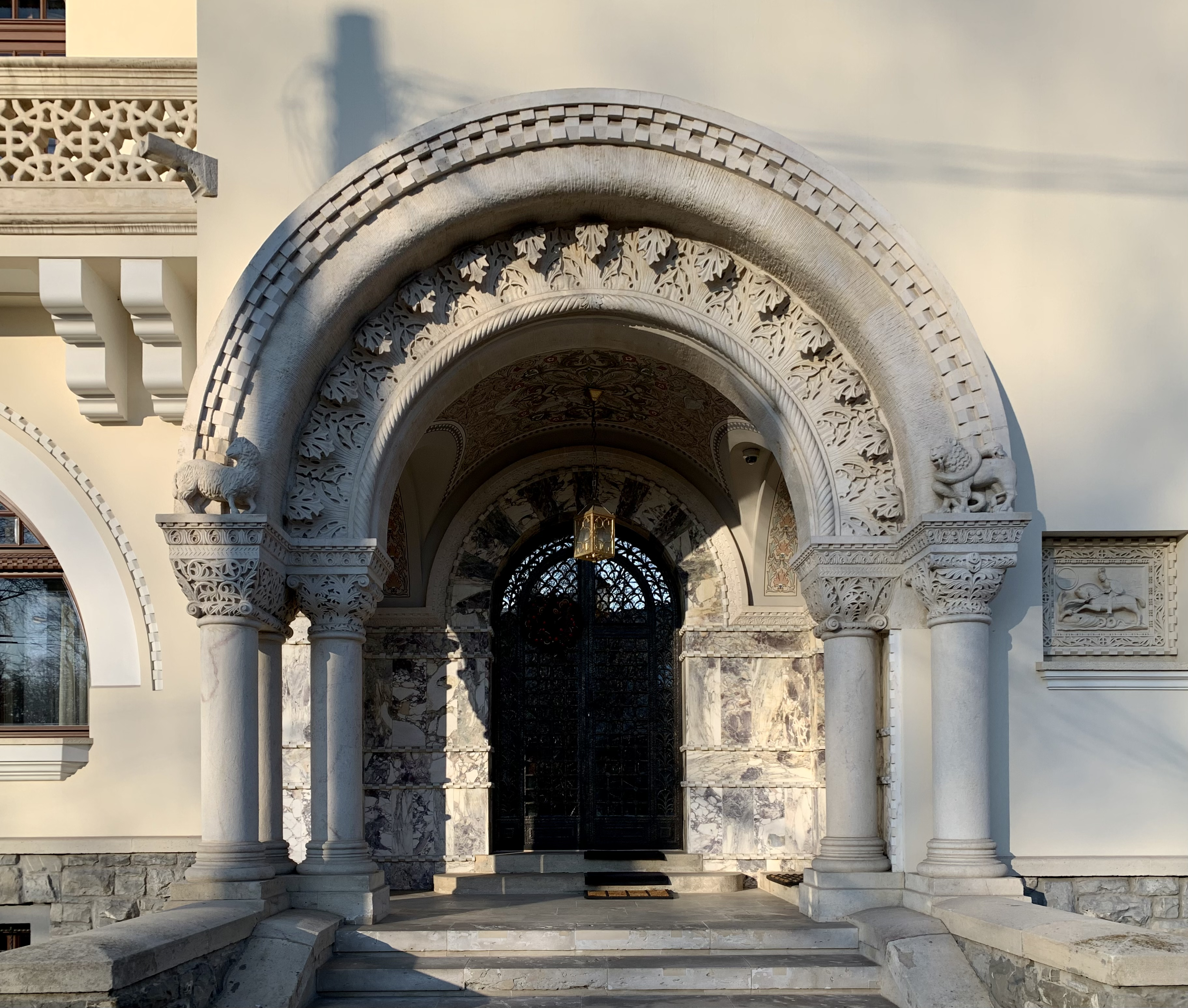
Entrance of the Laurențiu and Louise Steinebach House (Bulevardul Eroii Sanitari no. 18), Bucharest, by Alfred Popper, 1915–1916

Doctor Dobrovici House (Bulevardul Lascăr Catargiu no. 40), Bucharest, by Duiliu Marcu, 1919–1925

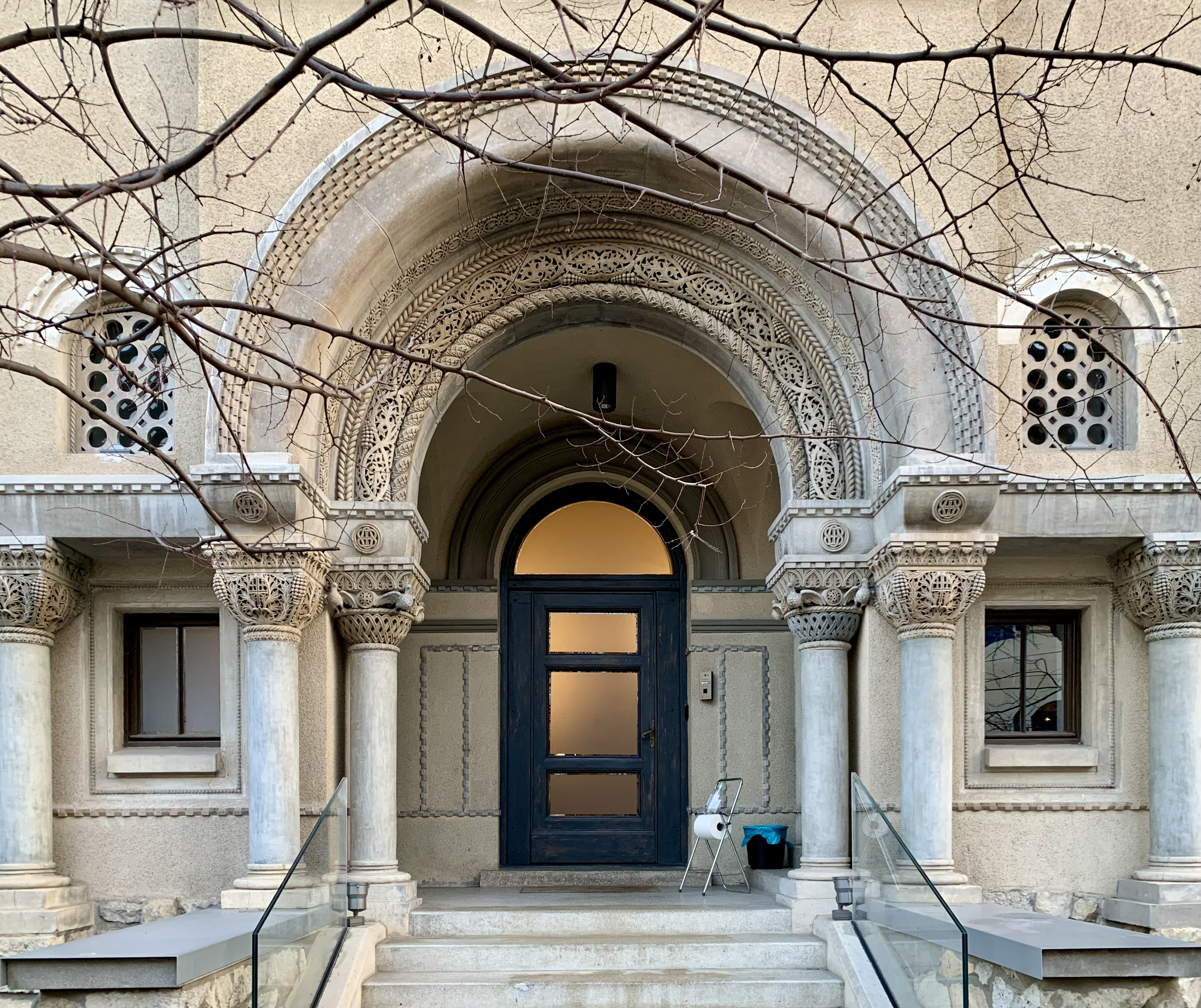
Doctor Ion and Maria Urlățeanu House (Strada Dumbrava Roșie no. 10), Bucharest, by Alfred Popper, 1922–1923

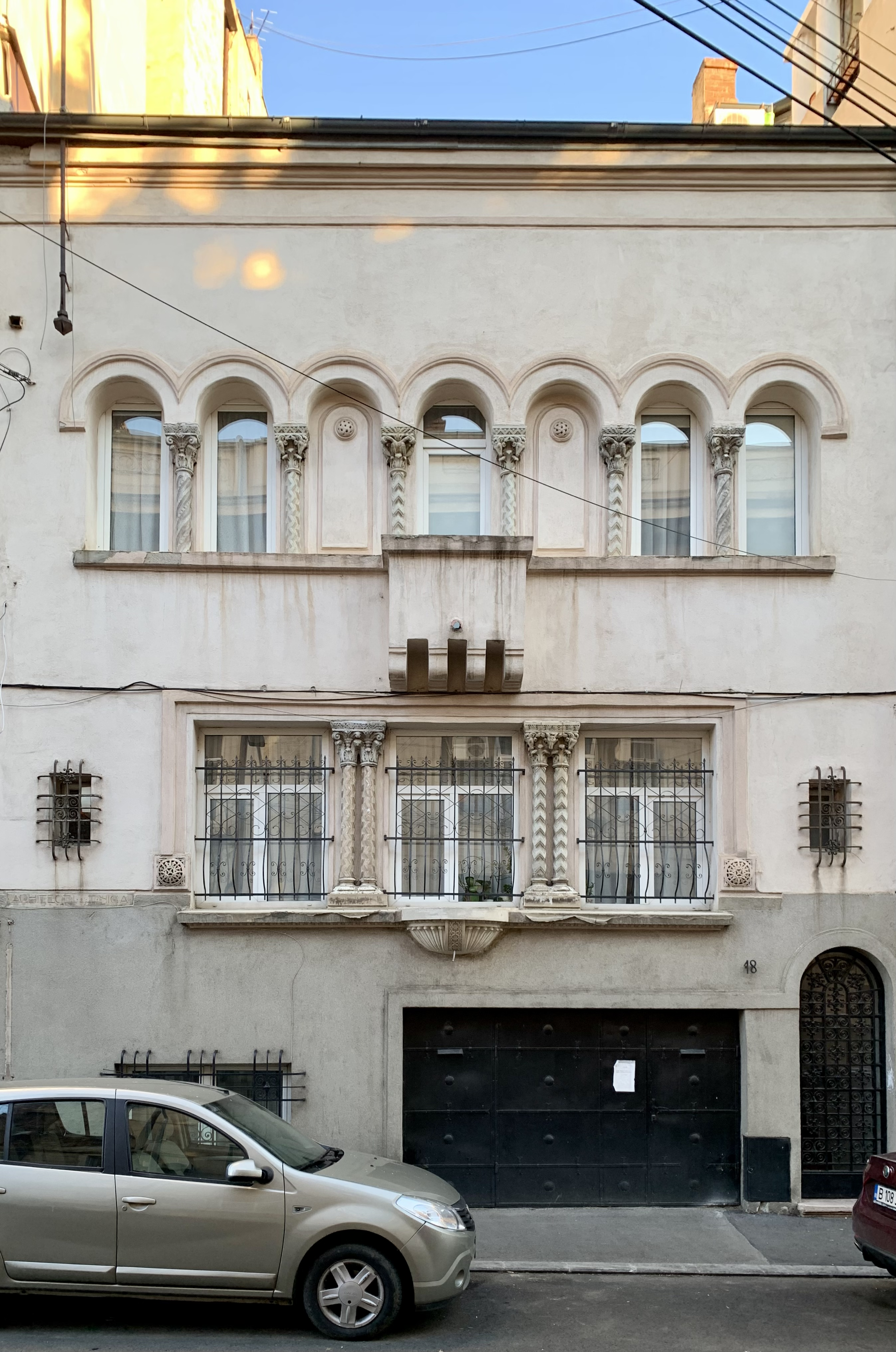
Strada Pictor Constantin Stahi no. 18, Bucharest, by Tiberiu Niga, 1930s

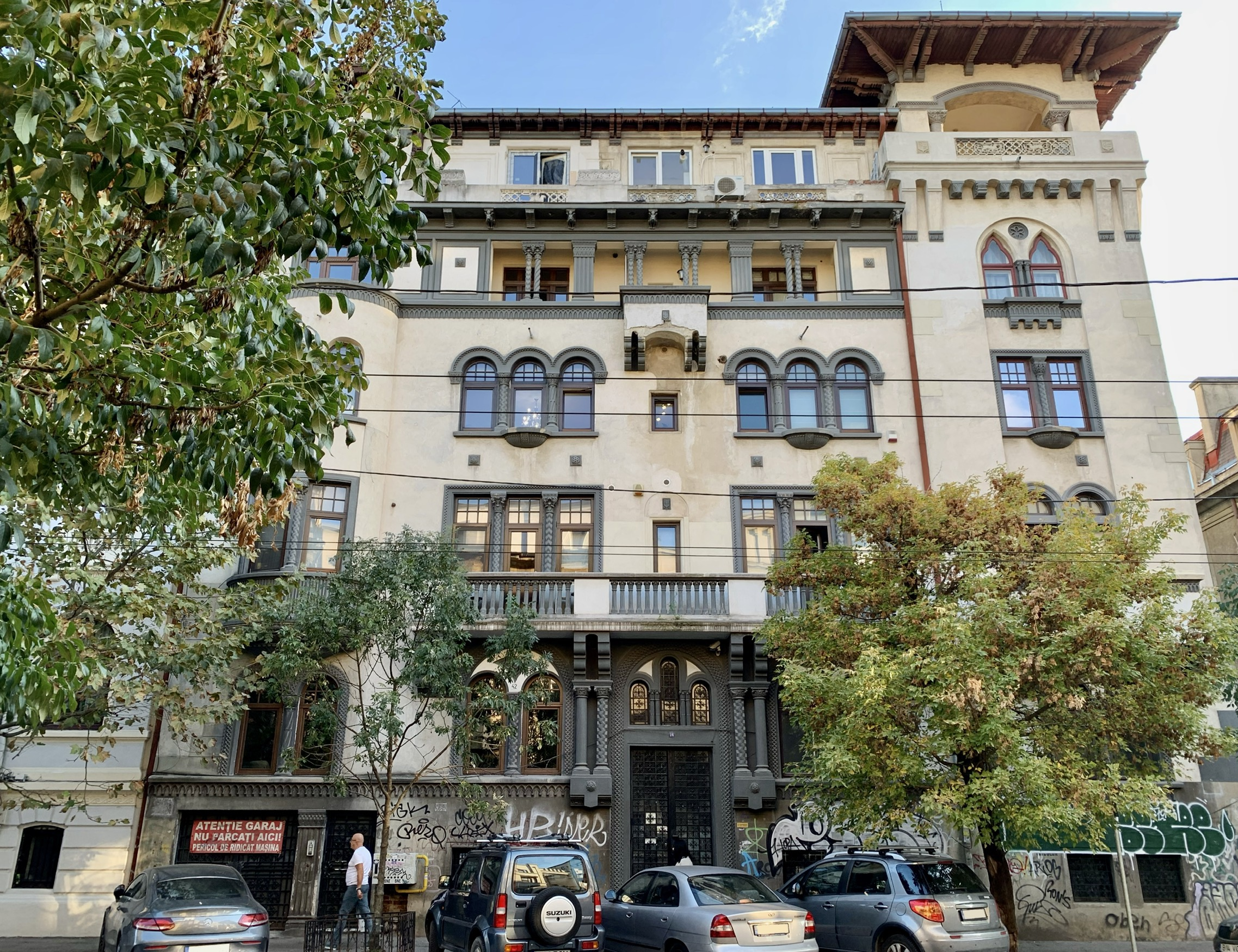
Bulevardul Dacia no. 42, Bucharest, unknown architect, 1930s
- Entrance of the Laurențiu and Louise Steinebach House, Bucharest (most of its architectural elements, both exterior the interior, with little Romanian Revival influences)
- People's Salvation Cathedral, Bucharest
- Holy Trinity Cathedral, Sibiu
- Coronation Cathedral, Alba Iulia
- Cathedral of Saints Peter and Paul, Constanța
- Domnița Bălașa Church, Bucharest
- Doctor Ion and Maria Urlățeanu House, Bucharest
- Aleea Alexandru no. 40, Bucharest
- Strada Pictor Constantin Stahi no. 18, Bucharest
- Strada Austrului no. 9, Bucharest
- Bulevardul Dacia no. 42, Bucharest
- Doctor Dobrovici House, Bucharest

== Serbia ==
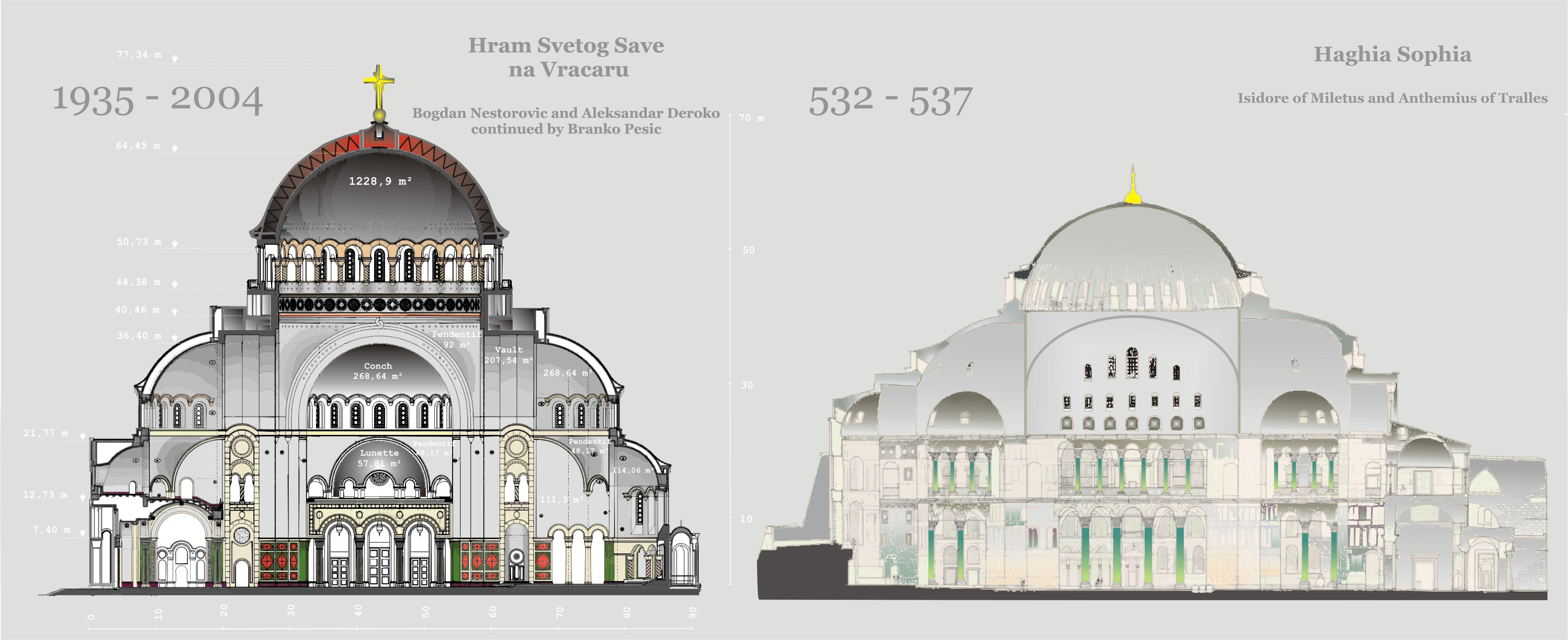
Church of Saint Sava in Belgrade paraphrases Hagia Sophia

Serbia's modern sacral architecture got its main impetus from the dynastic burial church in Oplenac which was commissioned by the Karađorđeviċ dynasty 1909. With the arrival of Russian émigré artists after the October Revolution, Belgrade's main governmental edifices were planned by eminent Russian architects trained in Russia. It was King Alexander I who was the patron of the Neo-Byzantine movement. Its main proponents were Aleksandar Deroko, Momir Korunović, Branko Krstić, Grigorije Samojlov and Nikolay Krasnov. Their main contribution were the royal castles on Dedinje, the Church of Saint Sava and the St. Mark's Church in Belgrade. After the communist era ended, Mihajlo Mitrović and Nebojša Popović were proponents of new tendencies in sacral architecture which used classic examples in the Byzantine tradition.

== Turkey ==
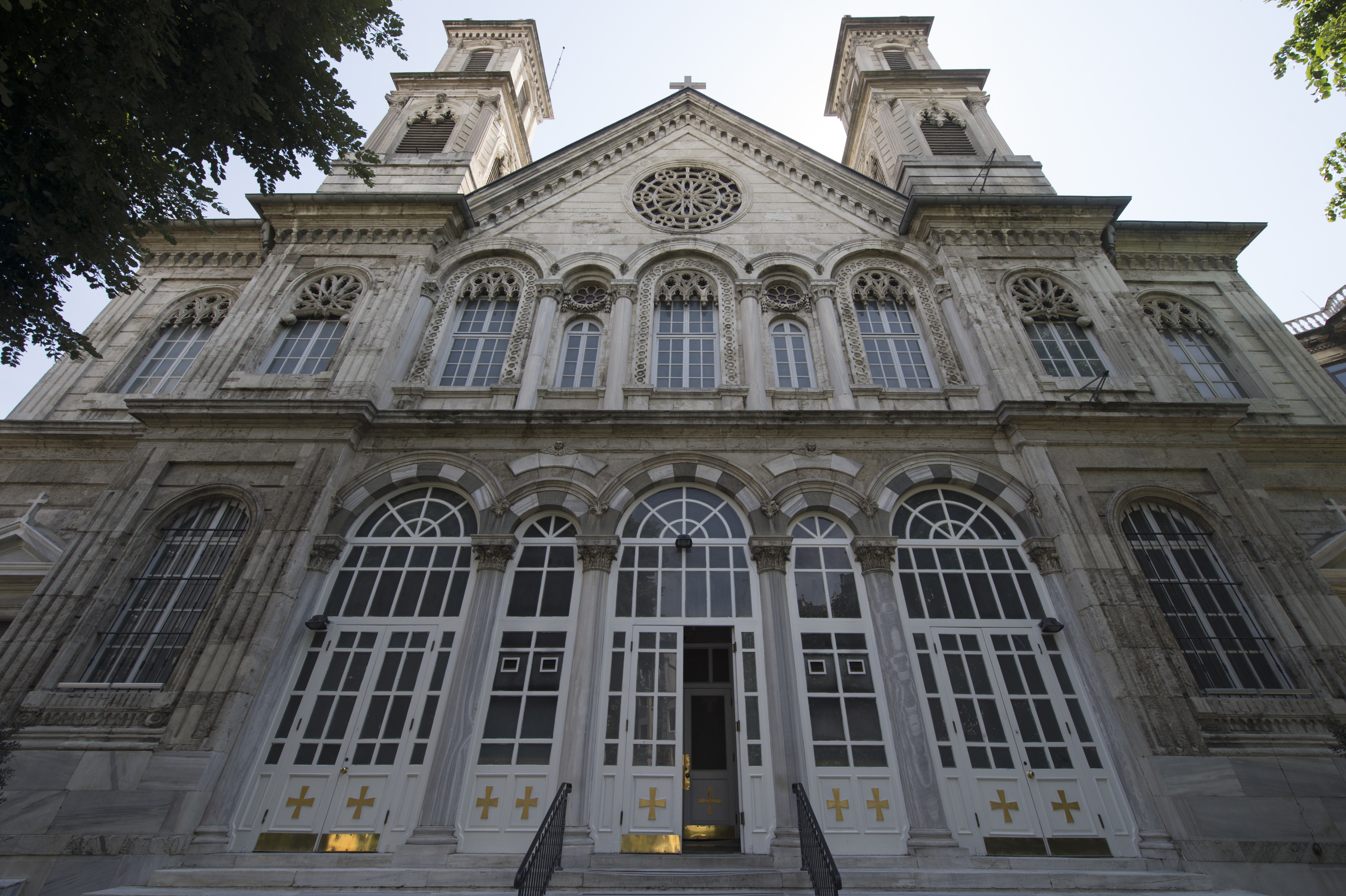
Hagia Triada in Istanbul, Turkey.

Istanbul: Hagia Triada, a 19th century Greek Orthodox Church located near Taksim Square in Istanbul, Turkey. Completed and opened in 1880.

Ayvalık: Çınarlı Mosque, Saatli mosque and Koç museum.

== Austria ==
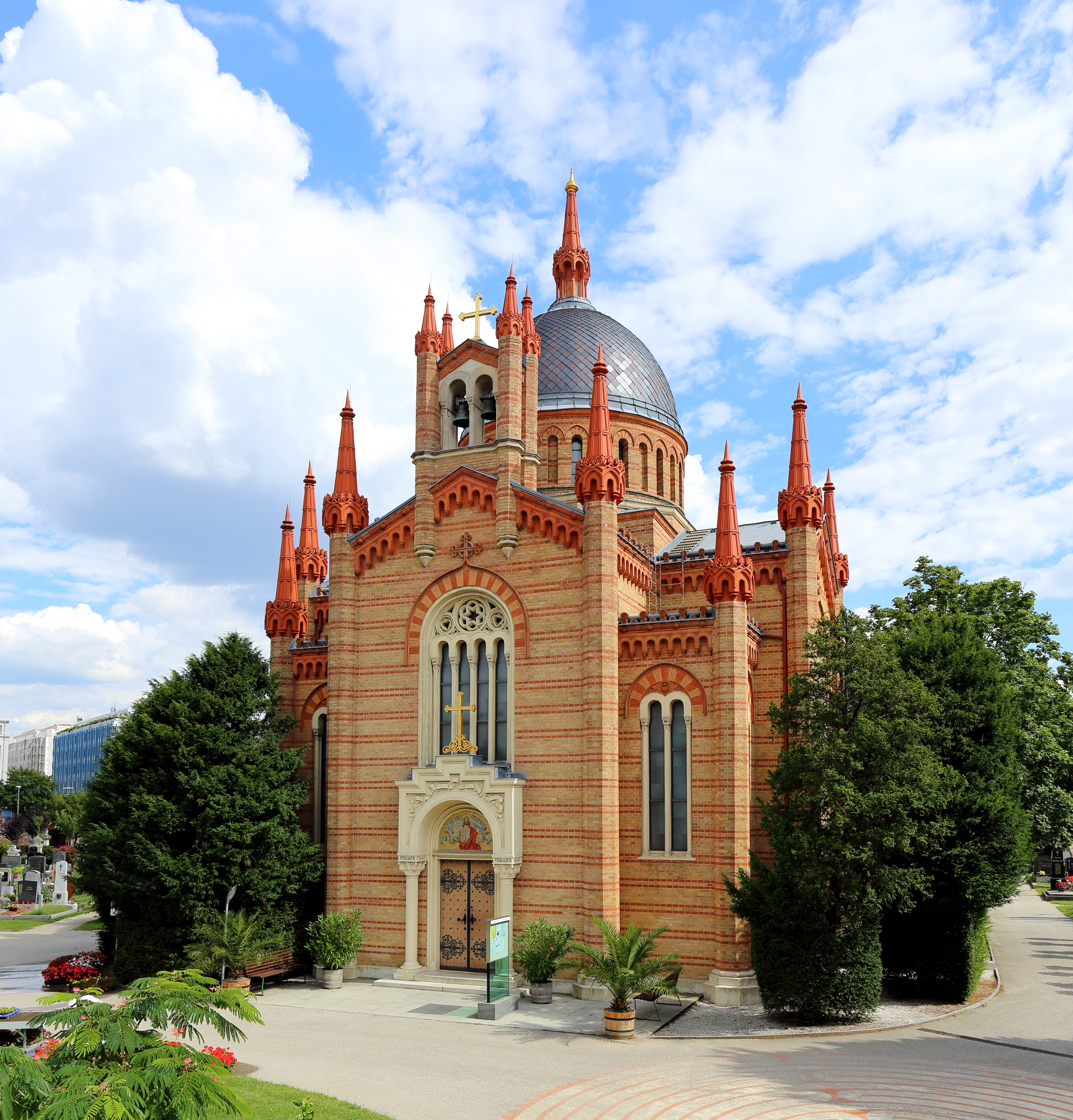
Christuskirche in Matzleinsdorf Protestant Cemetery, Vienna, 1858–1860

Danish architect Theophil Hansen became a supporter of the style in the 1850s. His major works belonged to the Neo-Grec and Neo-Renaissance style, however, Hansen as a professor of Byzantine art in the Academy of Fine Arts in Vienna shaped a generation of architects that popularized Neo-Byzantine architecture in Austro-Hungary, Serbia and post-war Yugoslavia. Hansen's own Neo-Byzantine work includes the Arsenal in Vienna (1852–1856, with Ludwig Förster), the Holy Trinity Greek Orthodox Church, Vienna (1856–1858) and the Christuskirche in Matzleindorf, Vienna (1858–1860).

== Germany ==
Earliest examples of emerging Byzantine-Romanesque architecture include the Alexander Nevsky Memorial Church, Potsdam, by Russian architect Vasily Stasov, and the Abbey of Saint Boniface, laid down by Ludwig I of Bavaria in 1835 and completed in 1840. The basilica followed the rules of 6th-century Ravenna architecture, although its corinthian order was a clear deviation from the historical Byzantine art. In 1876 Ludwig II of Bavaria commissioned Neo-Byzantine interiors of the externally Romanesque Neuschwanstein Castle, complete with mosaic images of Justinian I and Greek saints.

Several Neo-Byzantine-style churches were constructed during the Gründerzeit, for instance, the Sacred Heart Church or the Rosary Basilica, both located in Berlin.

== France ==
One of the earliest examples in France is the enormous Marseille Cathedral, built between 1852 and 1893, and the basilica of Notre-Dame de la Garde, both located in Marseille.

Another example is the Russian orthodox Alexander Nevsky Cathedral in Paris build 1859–1861.

The Saint-Augustin in Paris build between 1860 and 1871 is an example of Eclectic Romano-Byzantine architecture.

A prominent example of Byzantine Revival architecture in France is the Basilica of Sacre-Coeur in Paris, built between 1875 and 1914, based on the original plan of Paul Abadie. It features five elongated domes on the exterior and an interior with mosaics and other art inspired by Byzantine art. Inspired by the former is another excellent example – the Basilica of Sainte-Thérèse, Lisieux completed in 1954.

== Great Britain and Ireland ==
Westminster Cathedral (1895–1903), the Catholic cathedral in London, is the largest and most thorough British effort in the style, by John Francis Bentley (1839–1902), but there are a number of other churches and other buildings such as the Christ Church, Brixton Road, also in London, by Arthur Beresford Pite, 1897–1903, near The Oval cricket ground and St Mary and St George Church, High Wycombe (1935–1938). From about 1850 to 1880 in Bristol a related style known as Bristol Byzantine was popular for industrial buildings which combined elements of the Byzantine style with Moorish architecture. Newman University Church, Dublin (1885–86) is a notable Irish example.

== United States ==
In the United States and elsewhere, the Neo-Byzantine style is often seen in vernacular amalgamations with other Medieval revivalist styles such as Romanesque and Gothic, or even with the Mission Revival or Spanish Colonial Revival styles.

The Basilica of the National Shrine of the Immaculate Conception is a large Catholic minor basilica and national shrine located in Washington, D.C., United States. The shrine is the largest Catholic church in North America, one of the largest churches in the world, and the tallest habitable building in Washington, D.C. Its construction of Byzantine Revival and Romanesque Revival architecture began on September 23, 1920, with renowned contractor John McShain and was completed on December 8, 2017, with the dedication and solemn blessing of the Trinity Dome mosaic on December 8, 2017, the Feast of the Immaculate Conception, by Cardinal Donald William Wuerl.

Other notable US examples include many buildings on the campus of Rice University in Texas, and Christ Church United Methodist in Manhattan by Ralph Adams Cram; Cathedral of Saint Paul (Minnesota), Immaculate Conception Church in New Orleans, St. Francis de Sales Church in Philadelphia, Cathedral Basilica of St. Louis, Temple Beth Israel in Portland, Oregon, Sts. Peter and Paul Orthodox Church in Buffalo, New York, and Touro Synagogue in New Orleans, Louisiana.

== Gallery ==
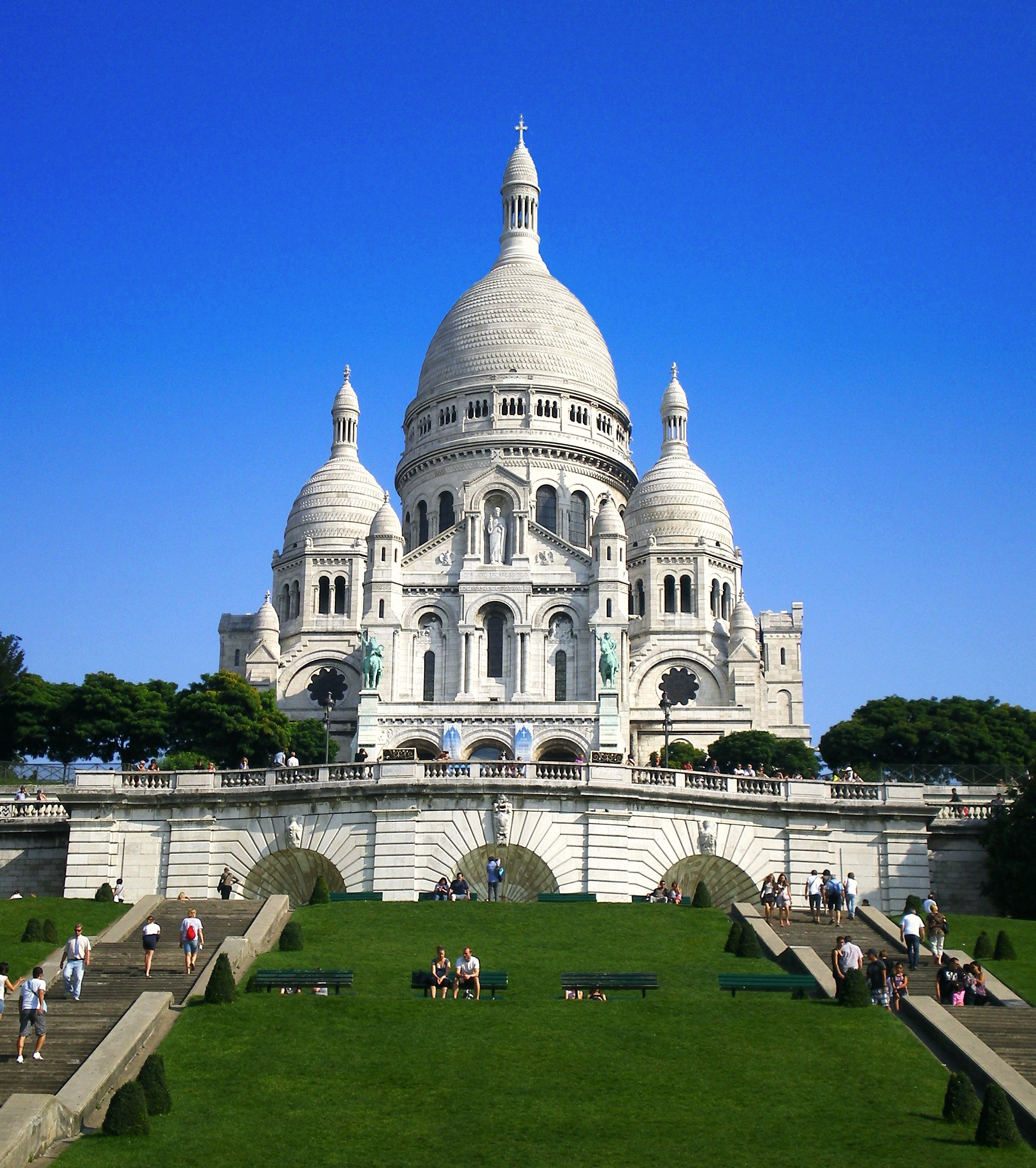
Basilica of Sacre-Coeur, Paris (1875–1914)

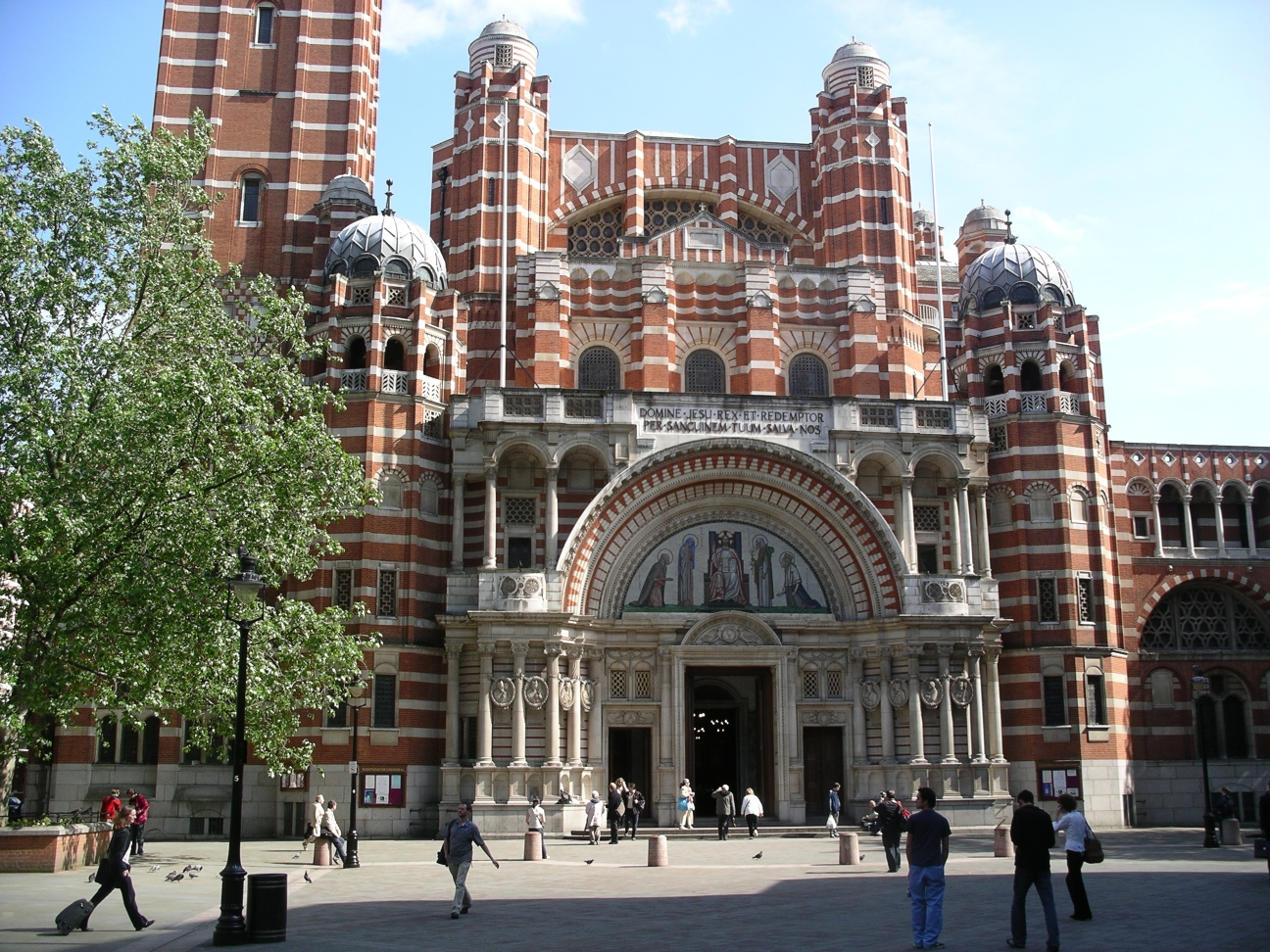
The Neo-Byzantine façade of Westminster Cathedral, London

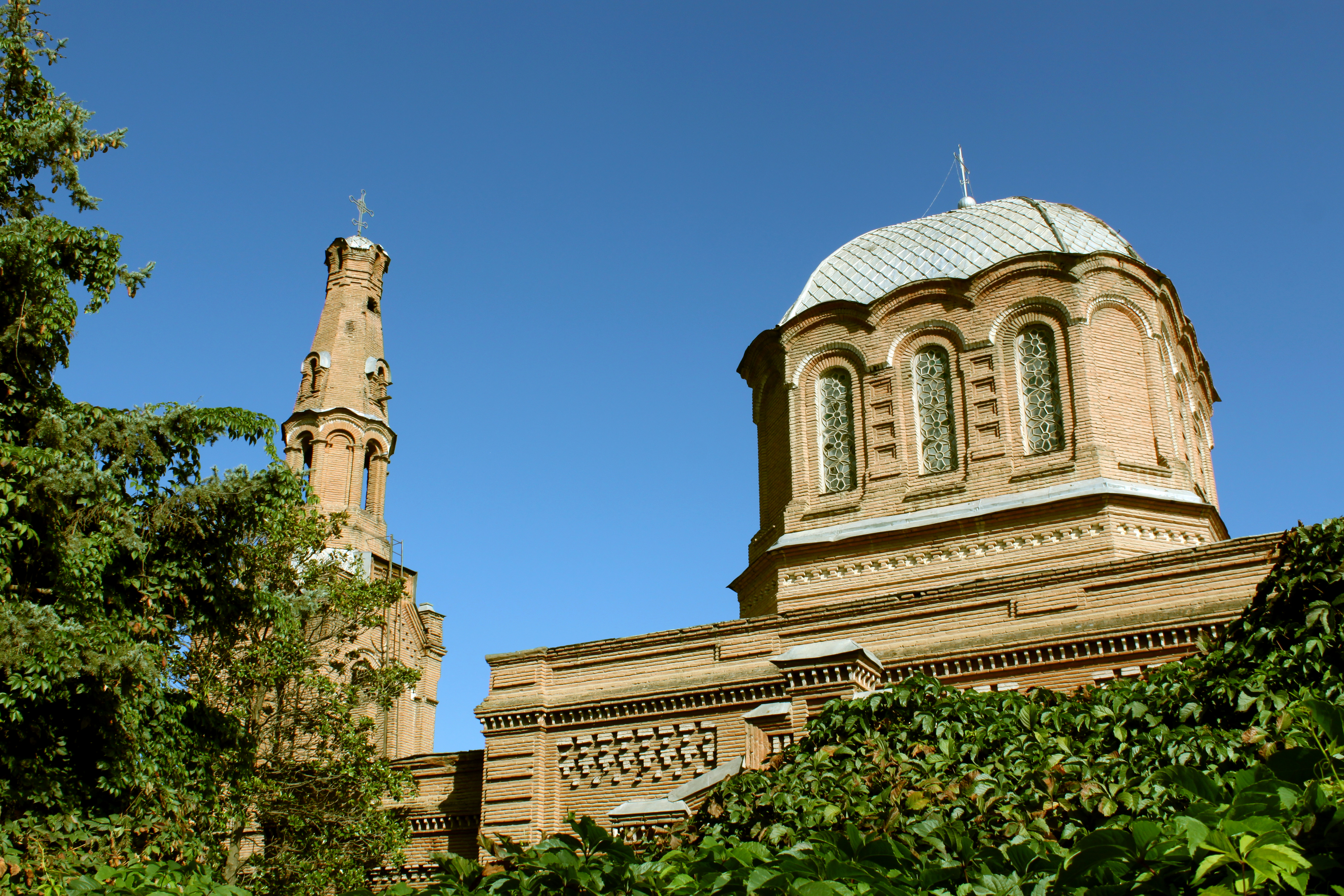
Alexander Nevsky Church, Ganja

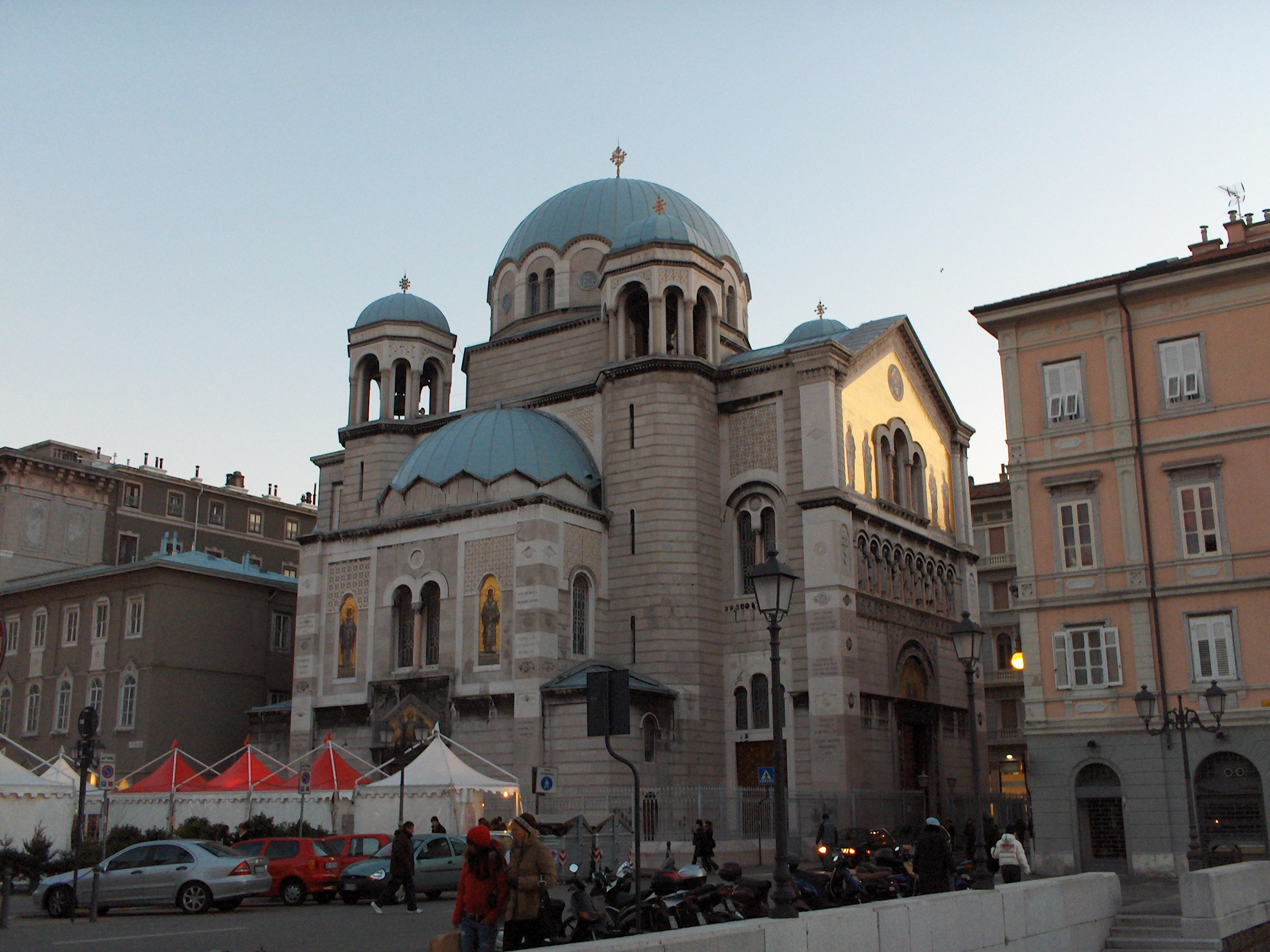
Saint Spyridon Church, Trieste

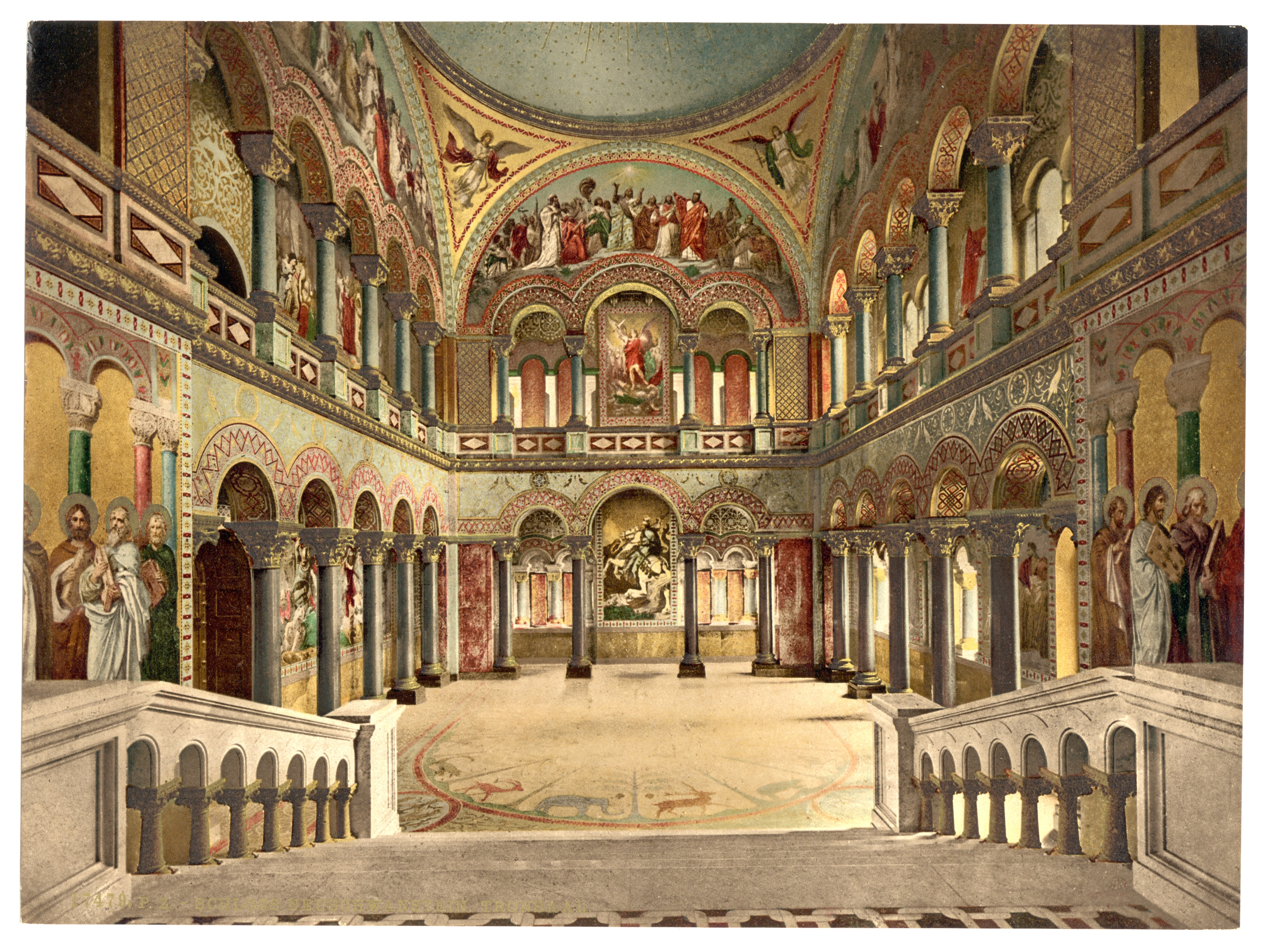
Painting of the Neuschwanstein Castle Throne Room

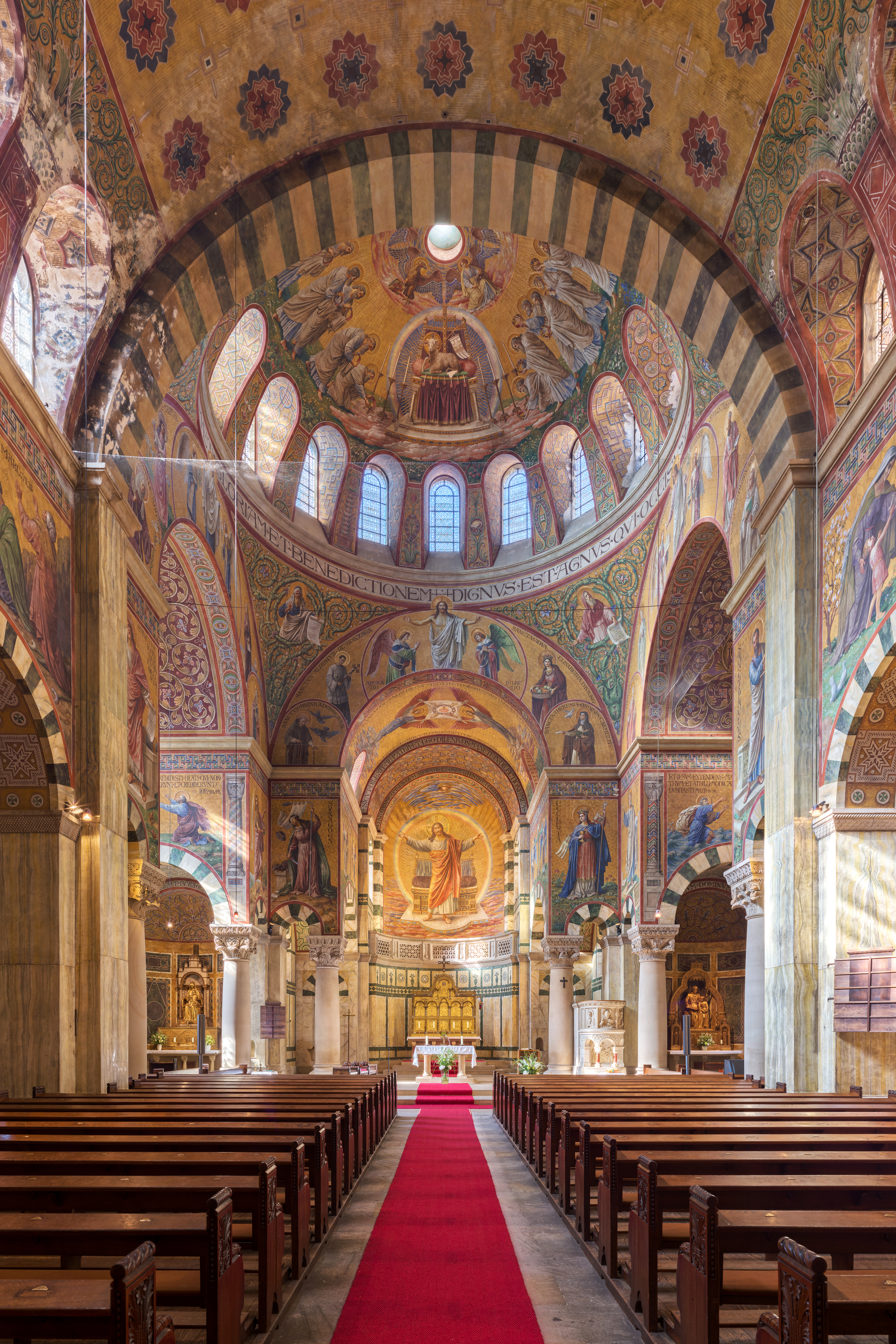
Interior of the Sacred Heart Church, Berlin

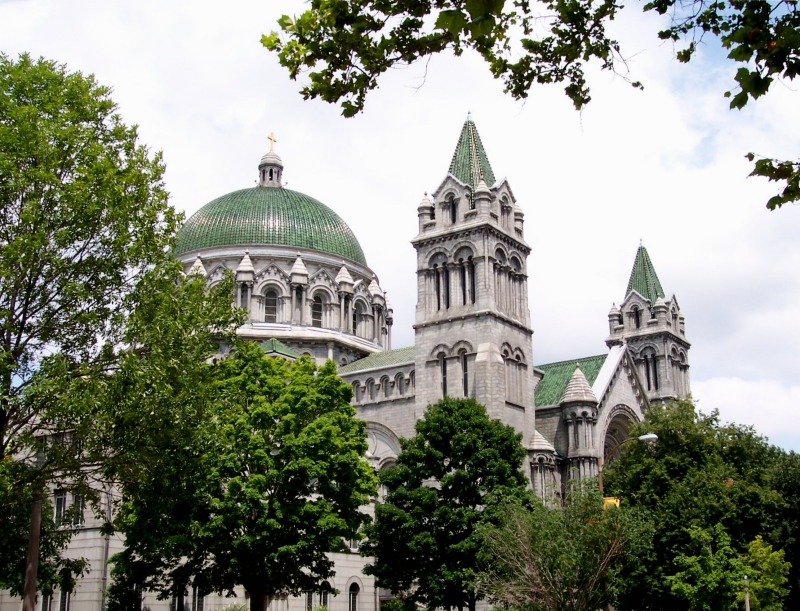
Cathedral Basilica of St. Louis, St. Louis, United States

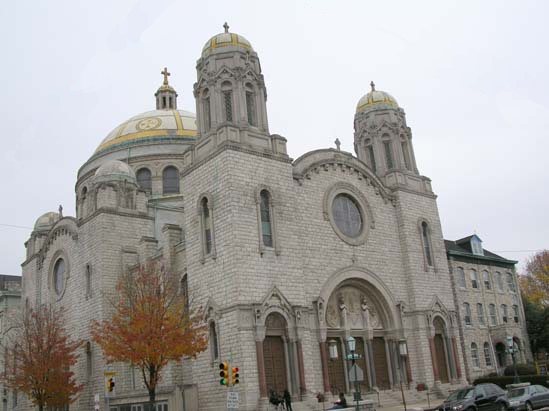
St. Francis de Sales Roman Catholic Church in Philadelphia, United States

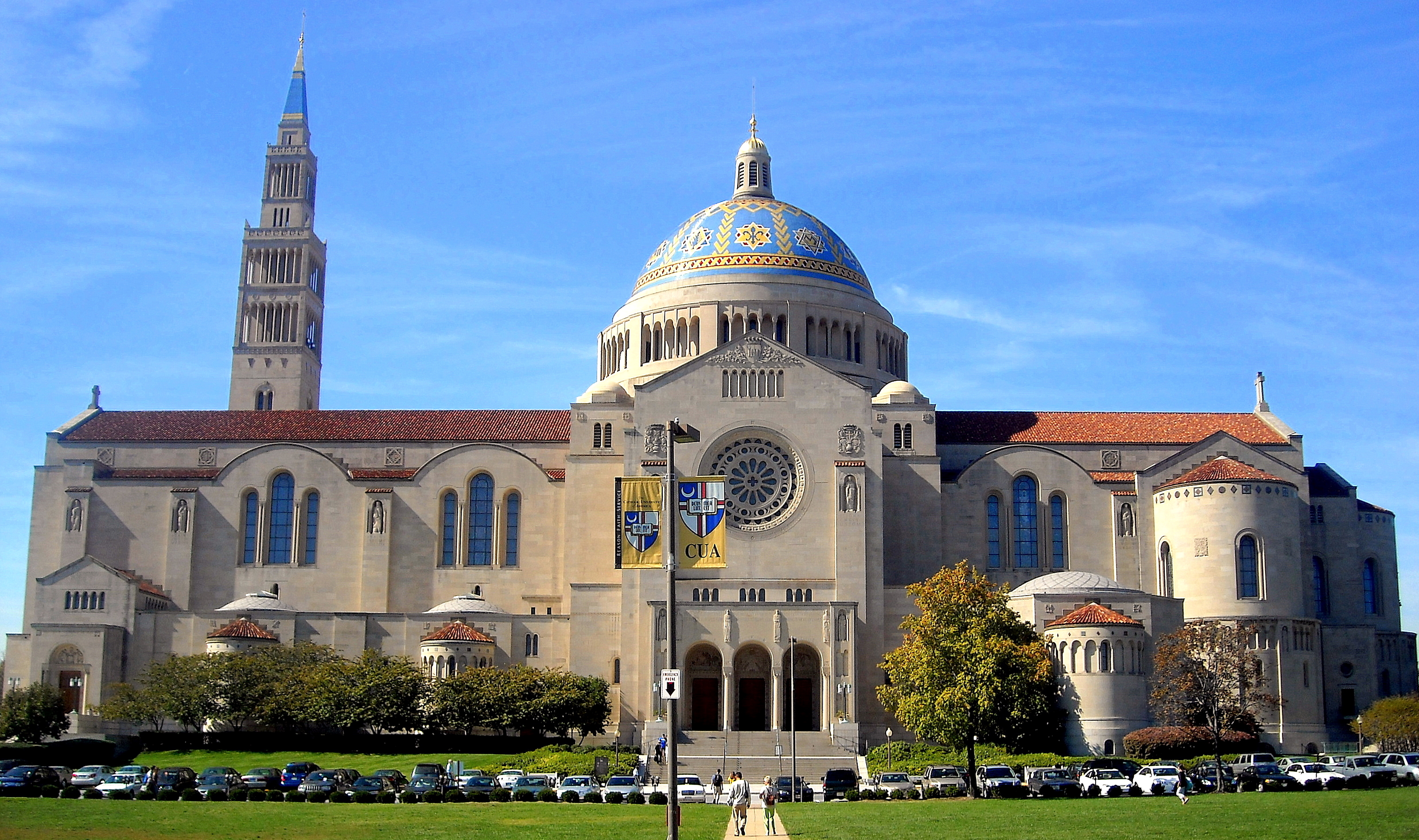
Basilica of the National Shrine of the Immaculate Conception, Washington D.C., United States

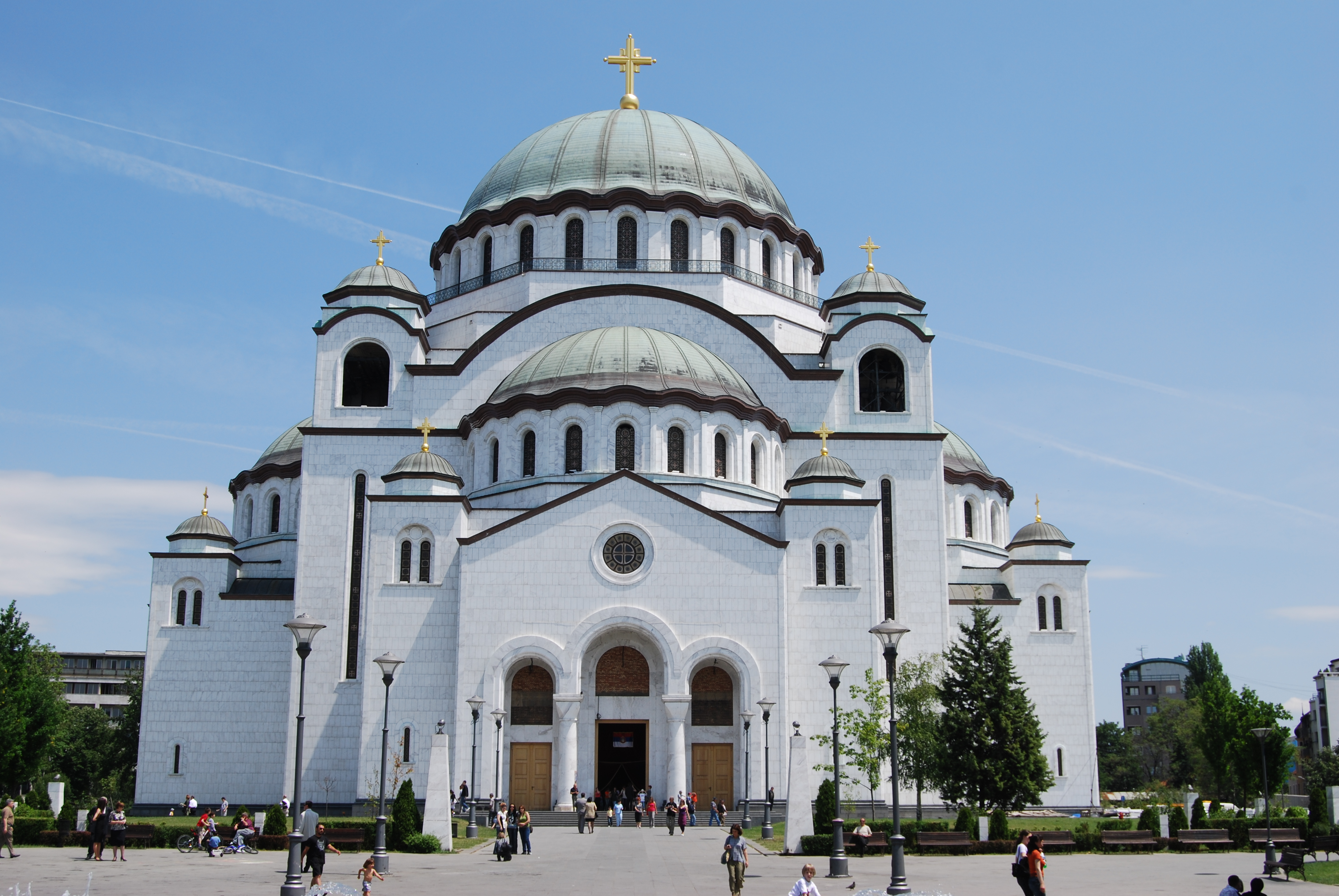
Church of Saint Sava, Belgrade

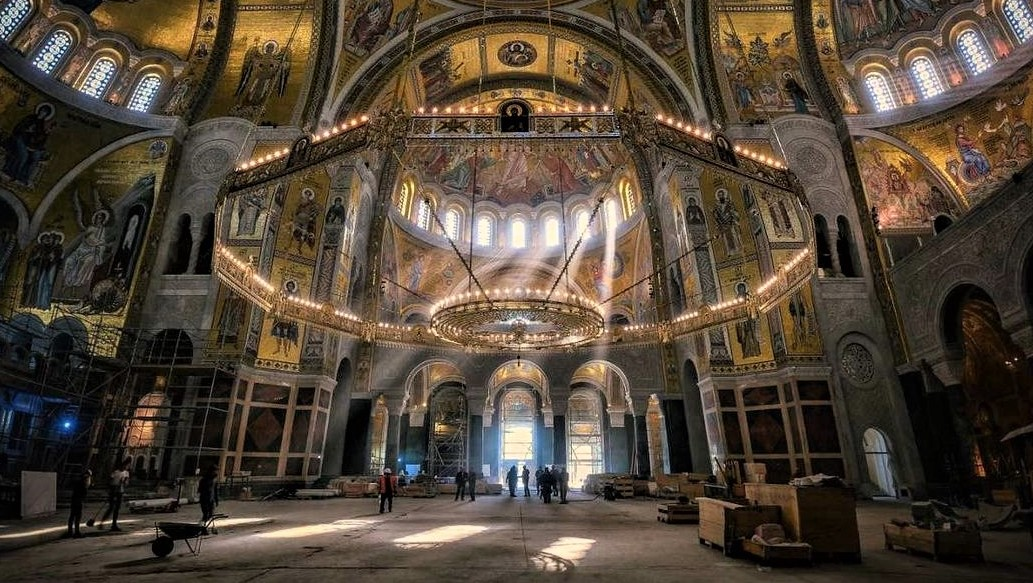
Interior of the Church of Saint Sava

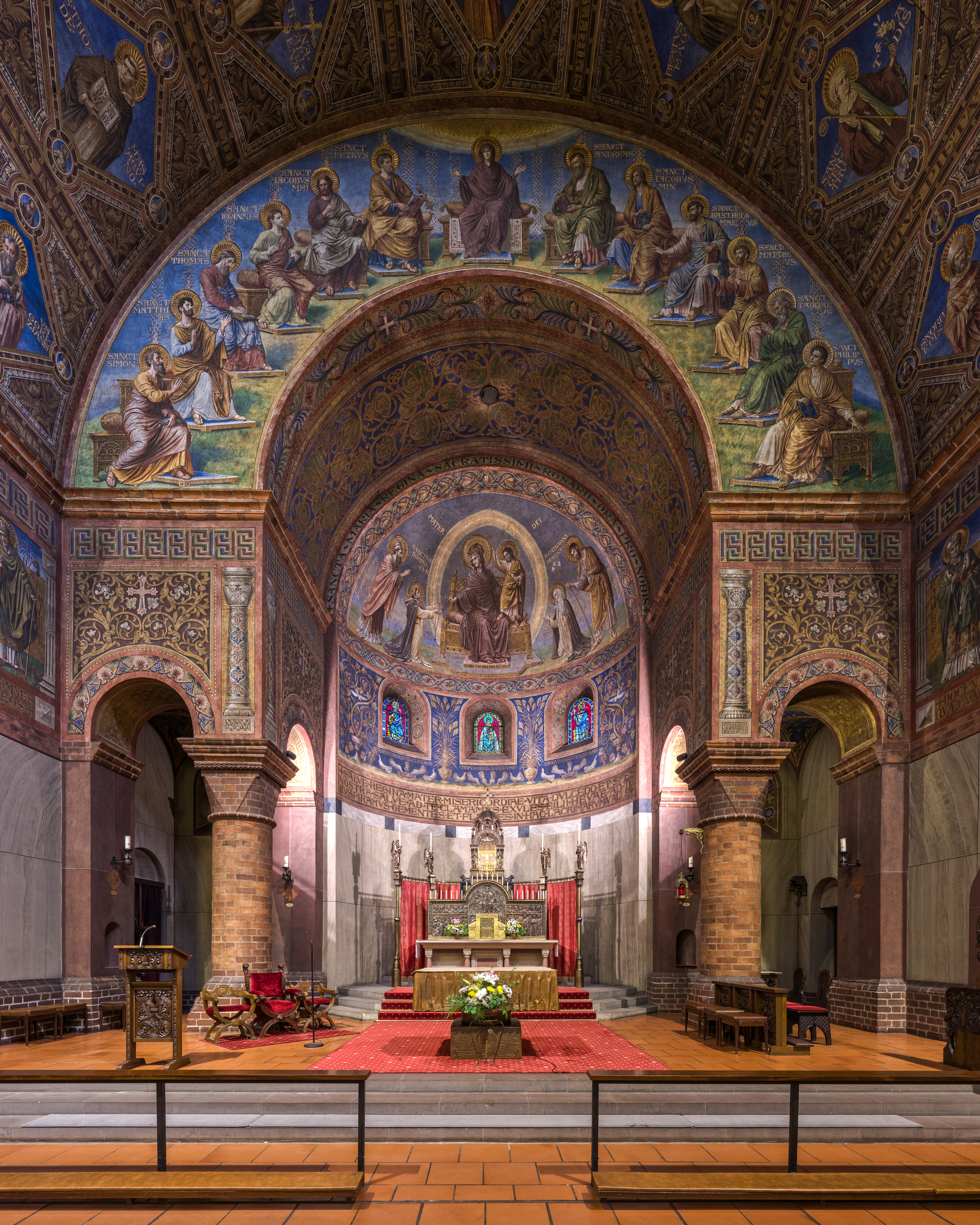
Interior of the Rosary Basilica, Berlin

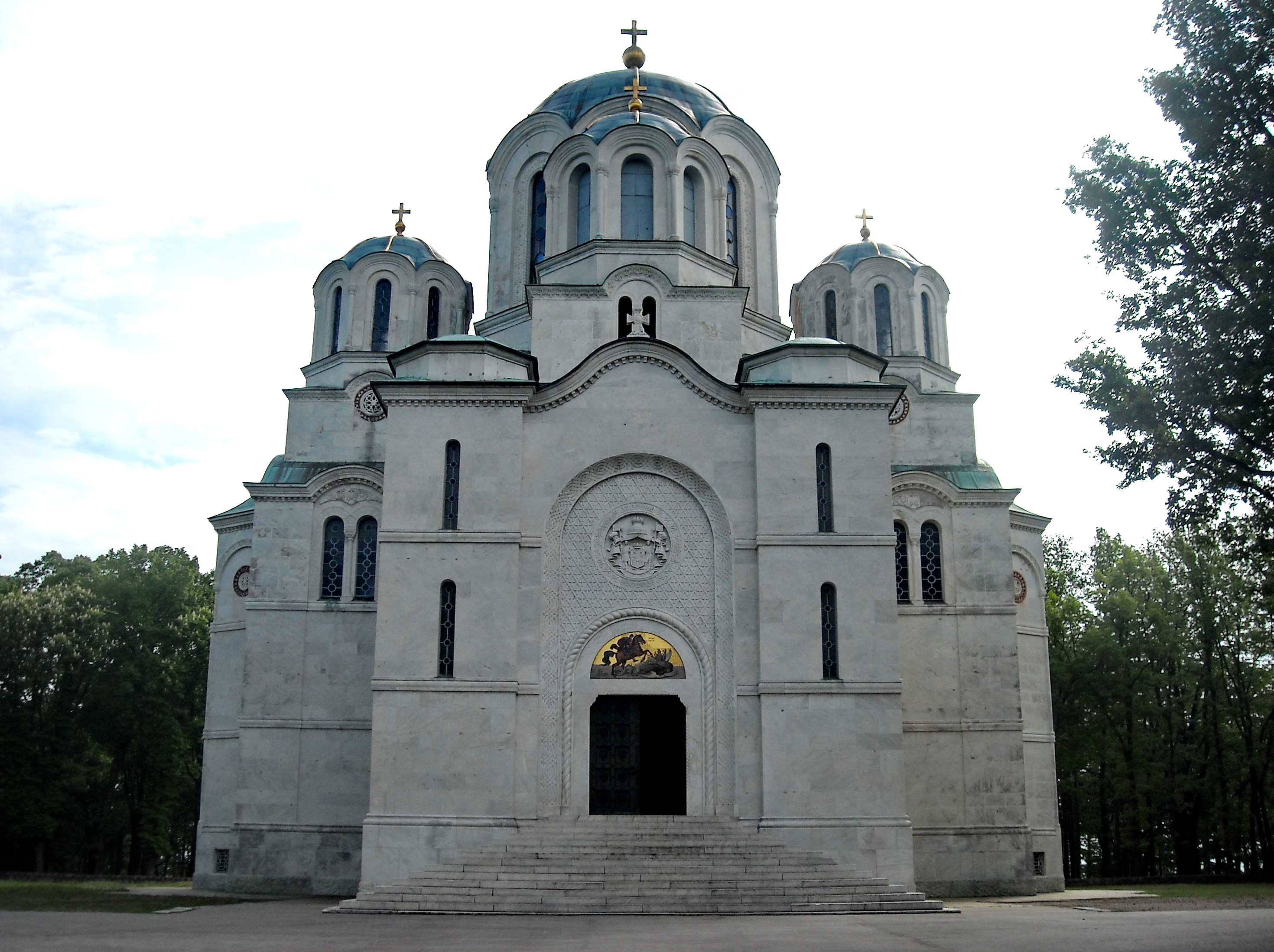
Oplenac Church-mausoleum, Topola

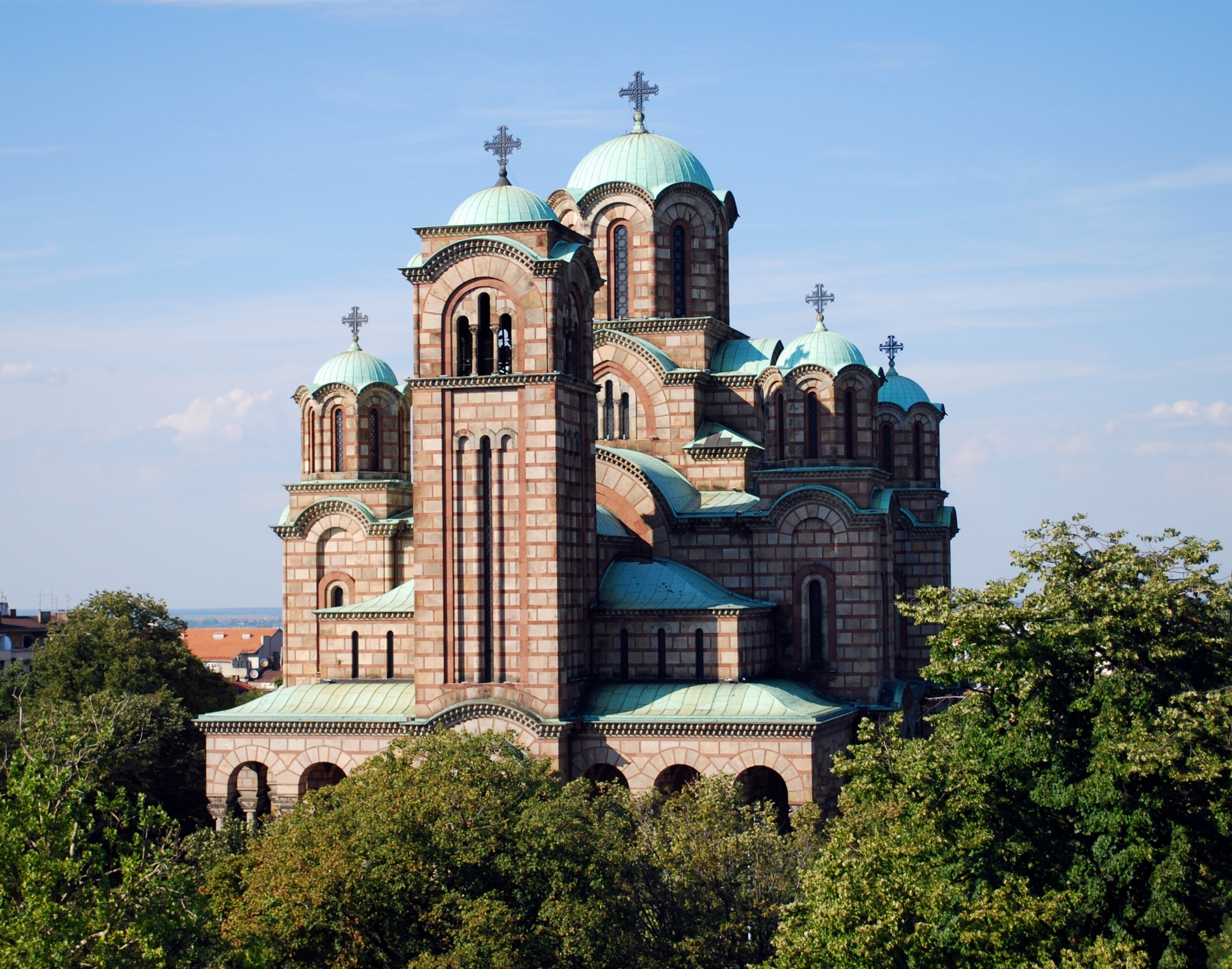
St. Mark's Church, Belgrade

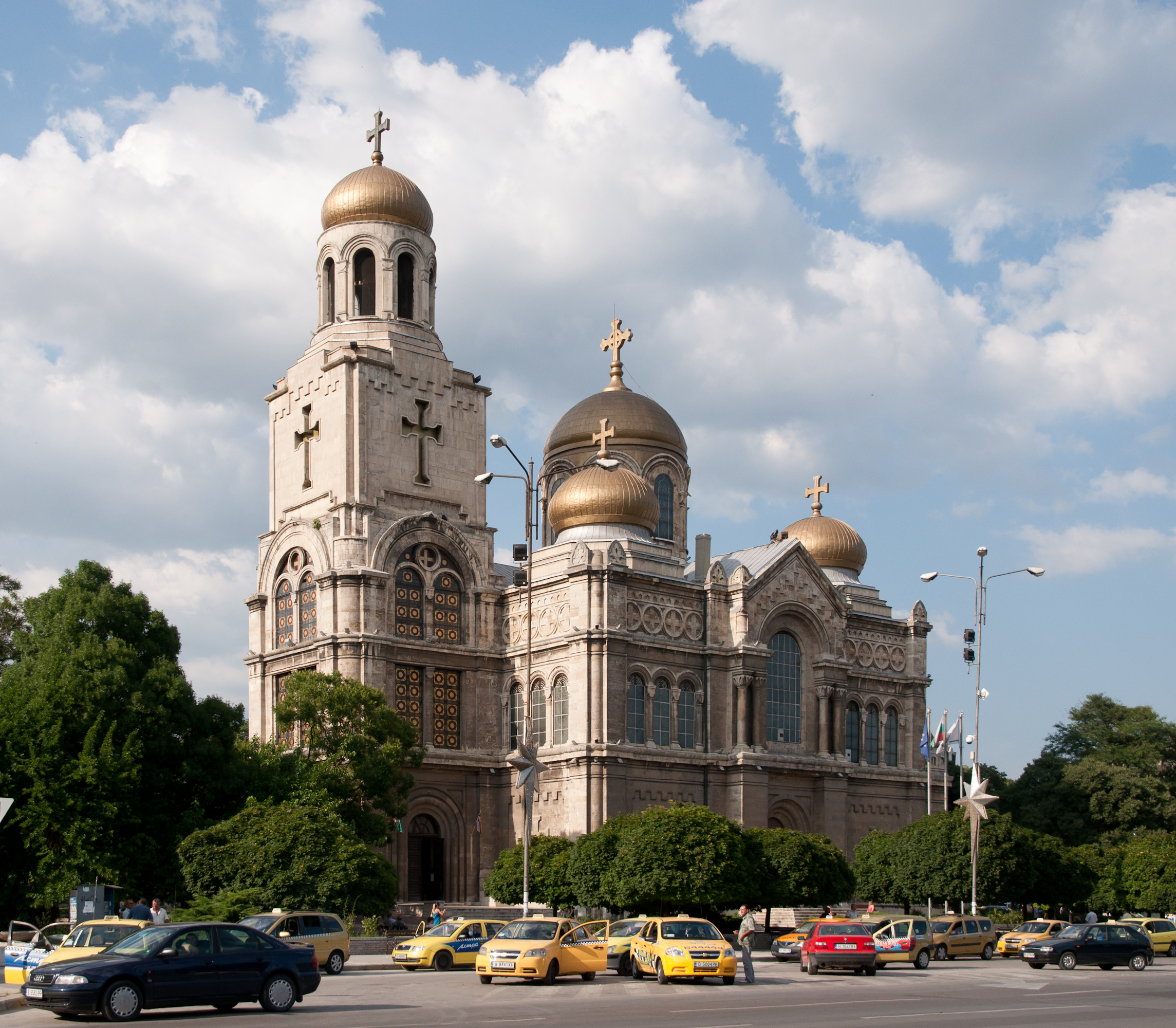
Dormition of the Mother of God Cathedral, Varna, Bulgaria.

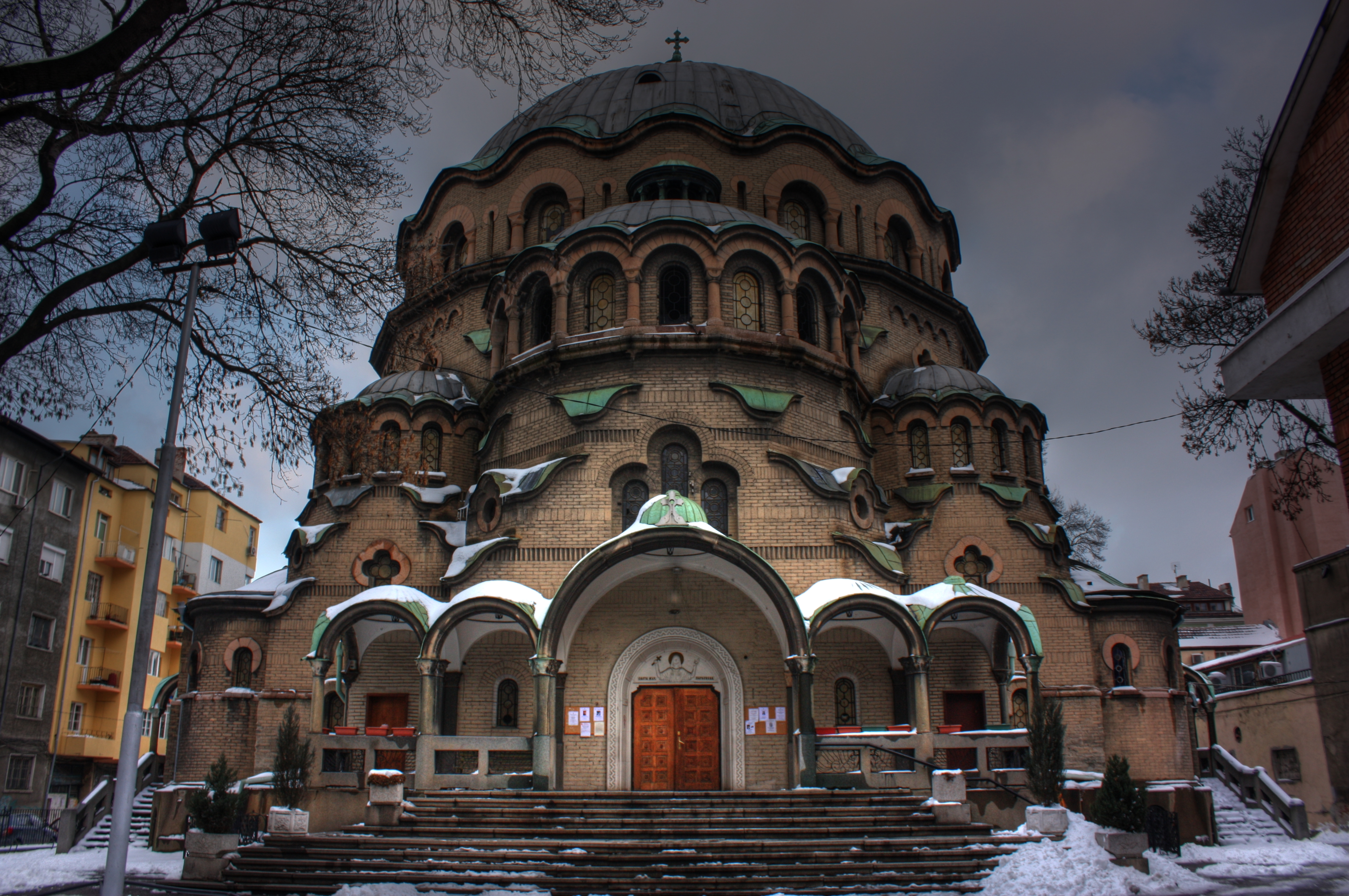
Church of St Paraskeva, Sofia, Bulgaria

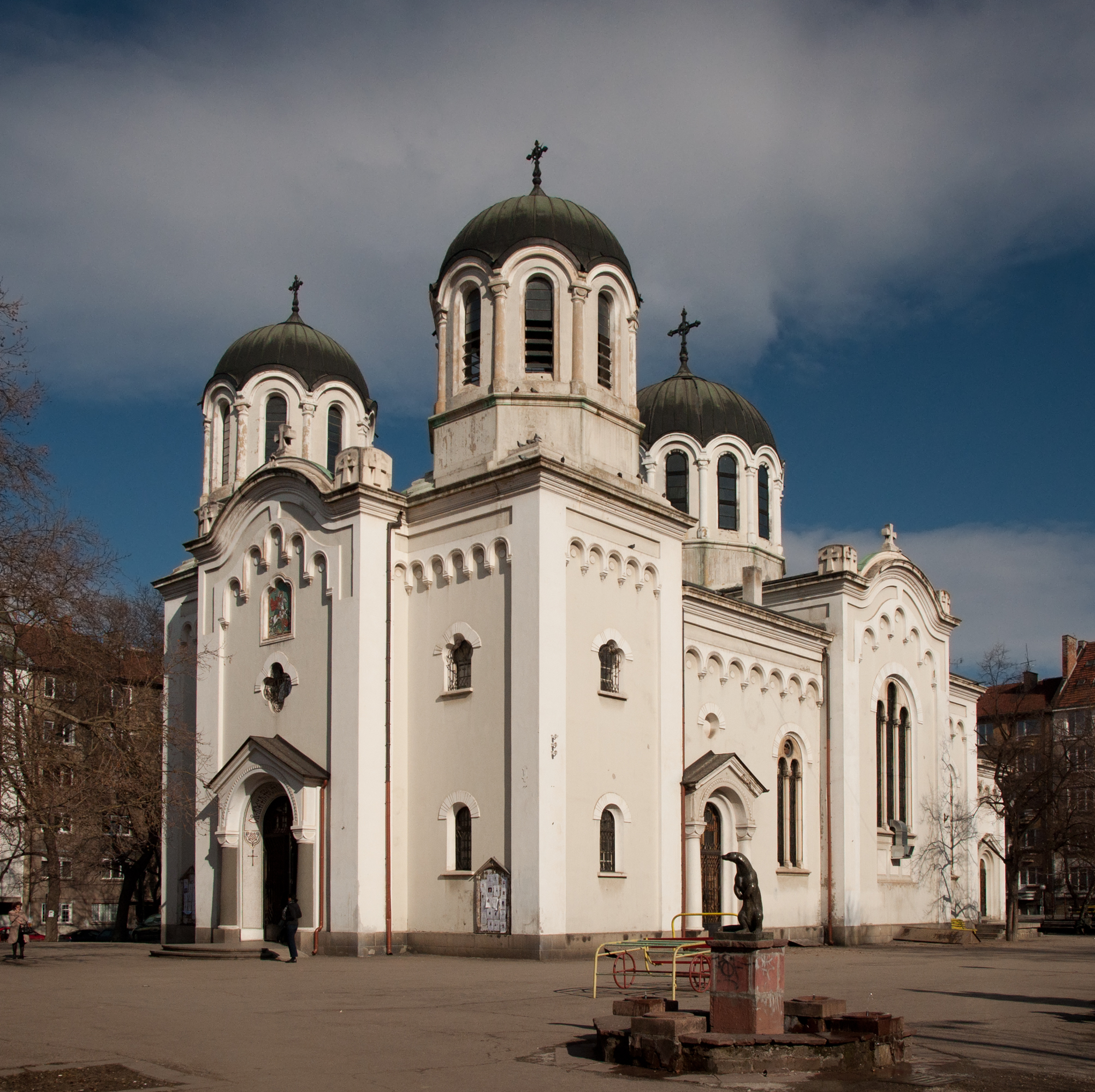
St. George the Conqueror church, Sofia, Bulgaria

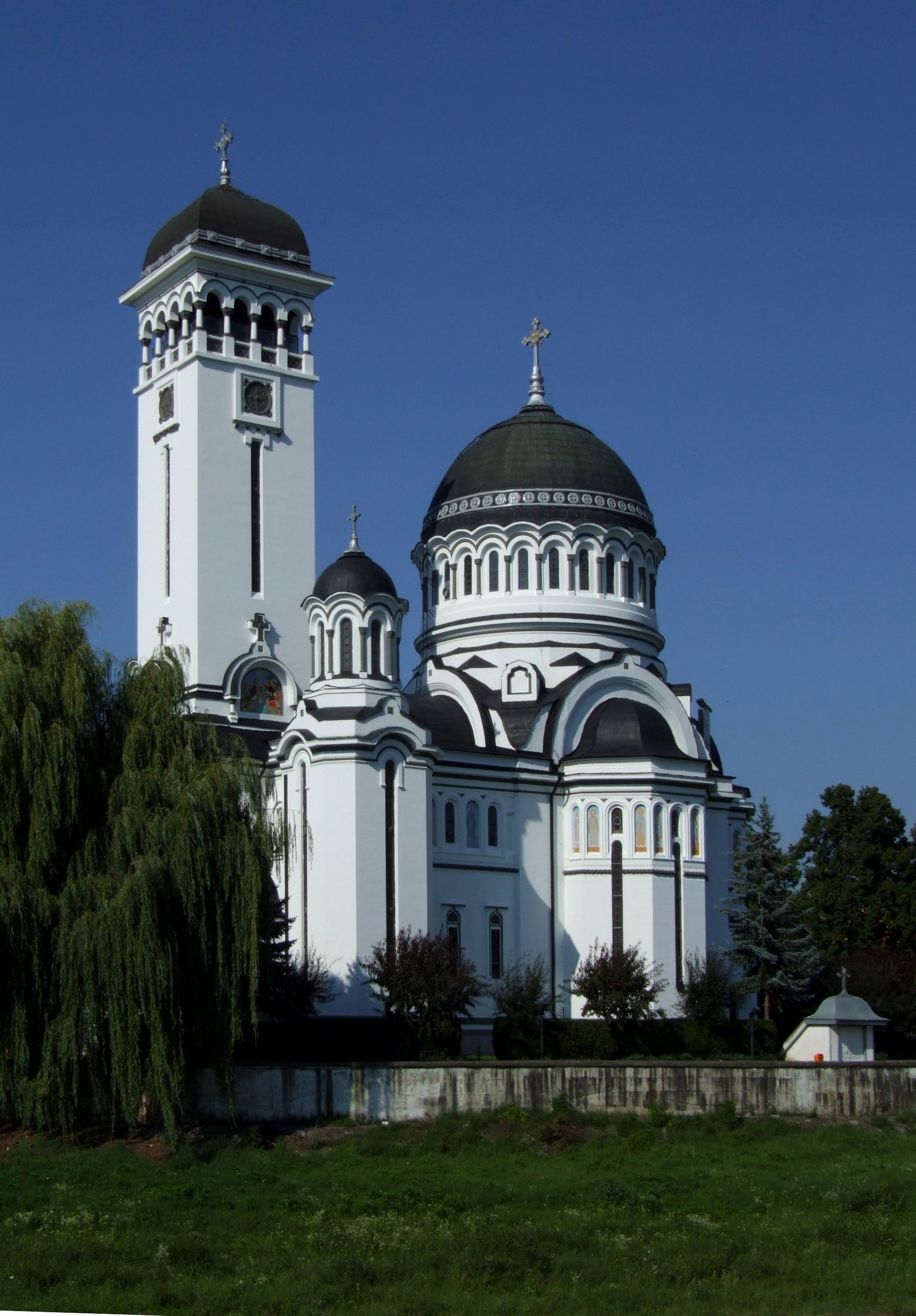
Holy Trinity Church, Sighișoara

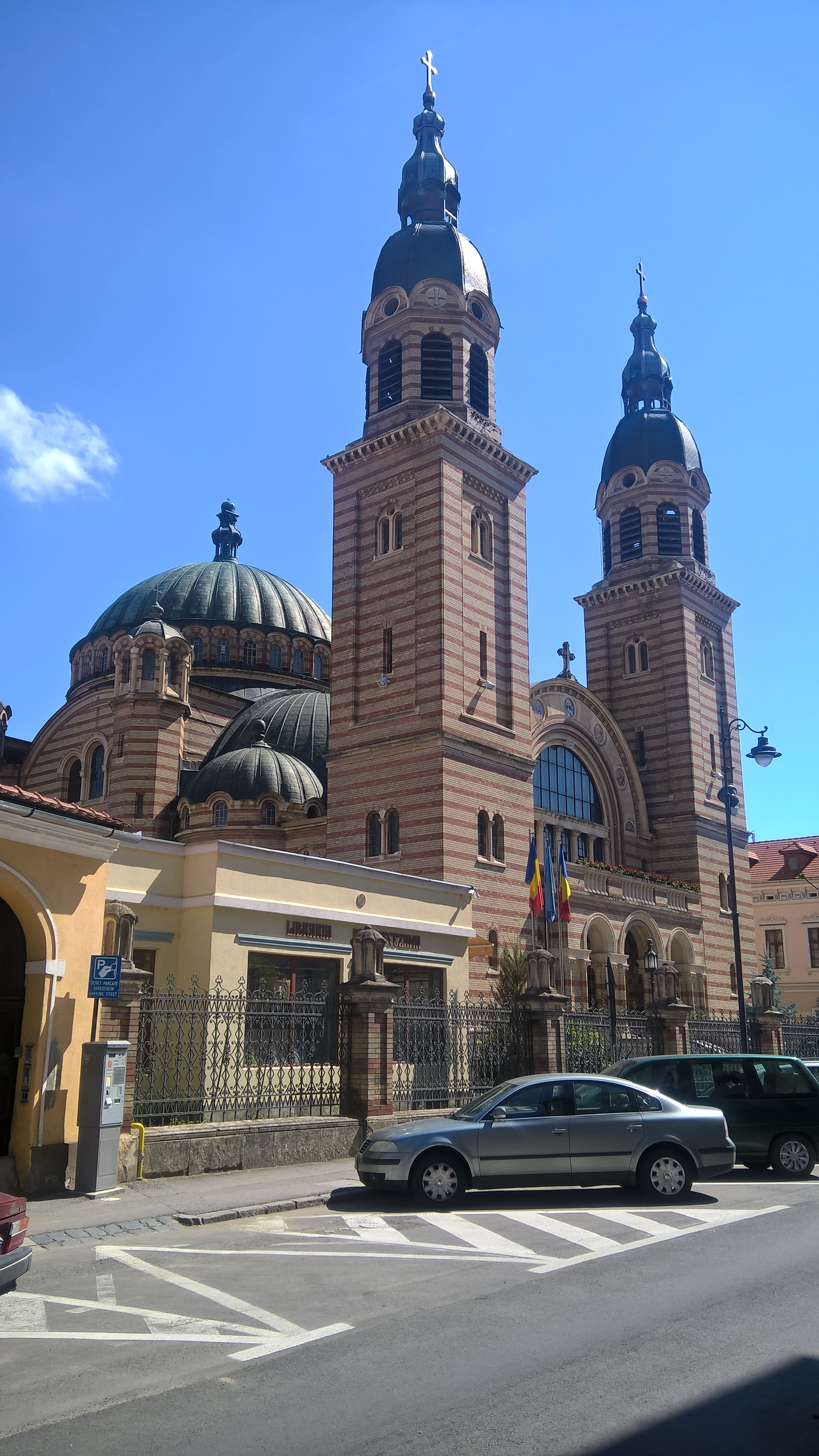
Holy Trinity Cathedral, Sibiu

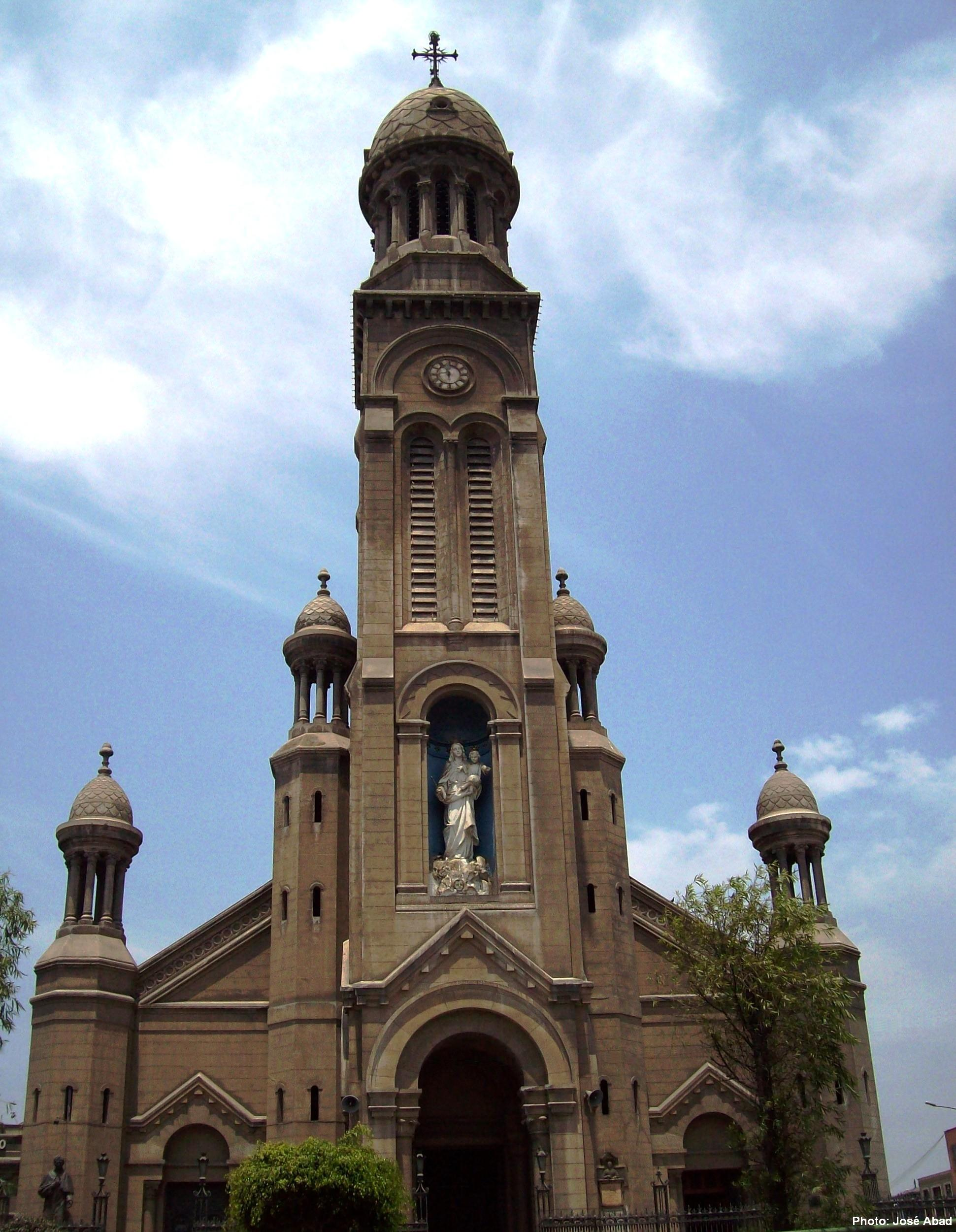
Basilica of Our Lady Help of Christians, Lima

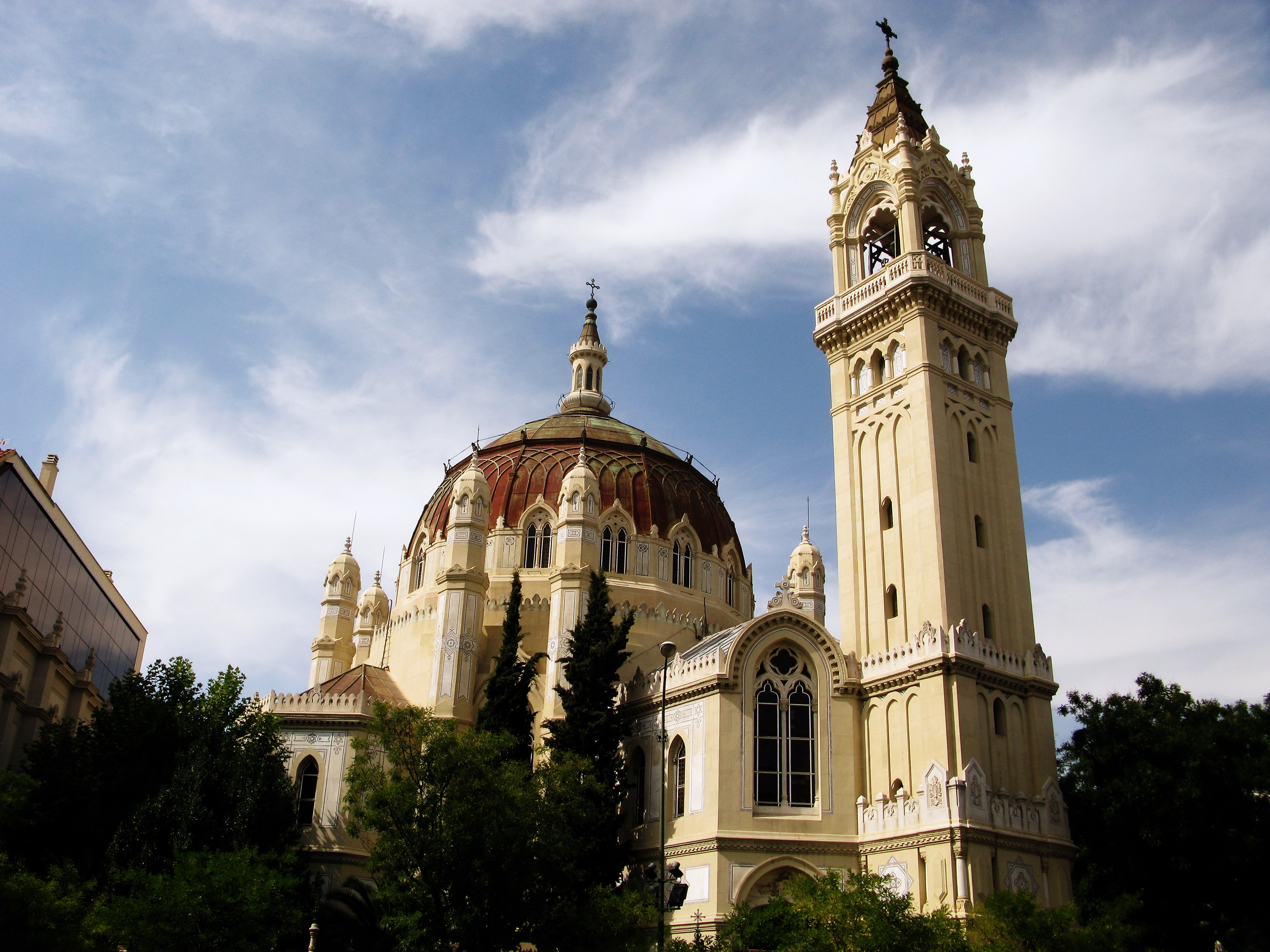
Church of San Manuel y San Benito, Madrid

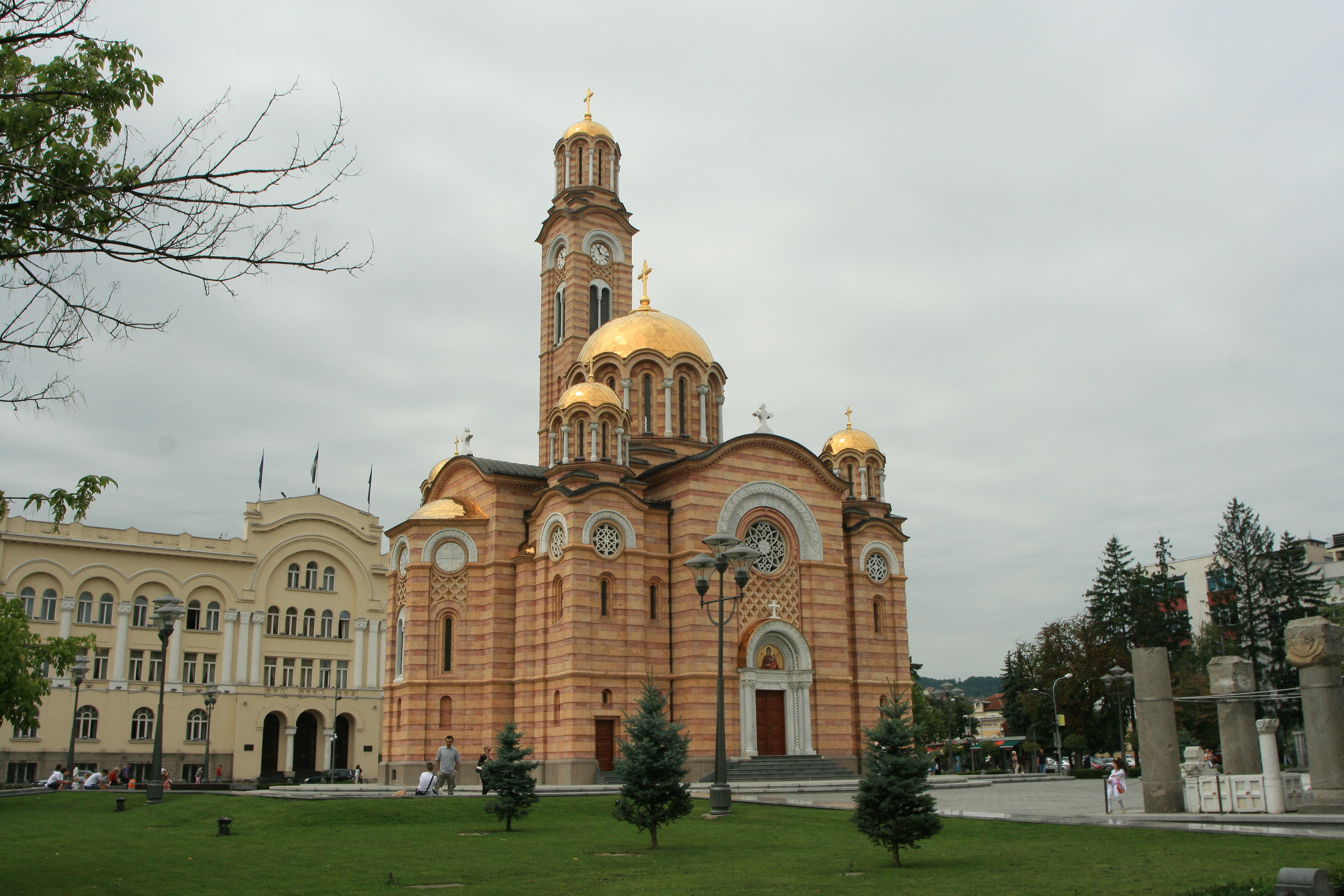
Cathedral of Christ the Saviour, Banja Luka

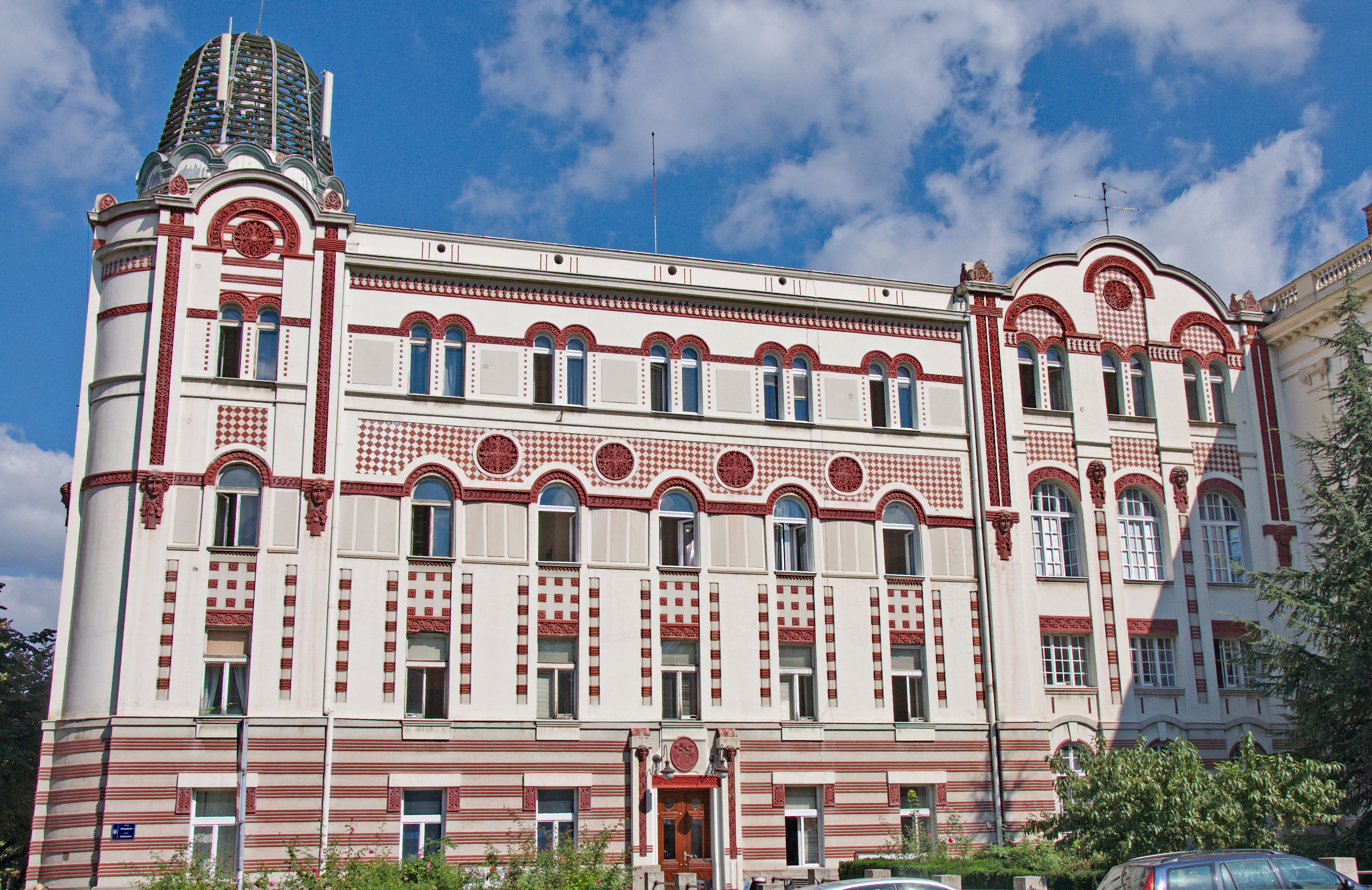
Old Telephone Exchange, Belgrade

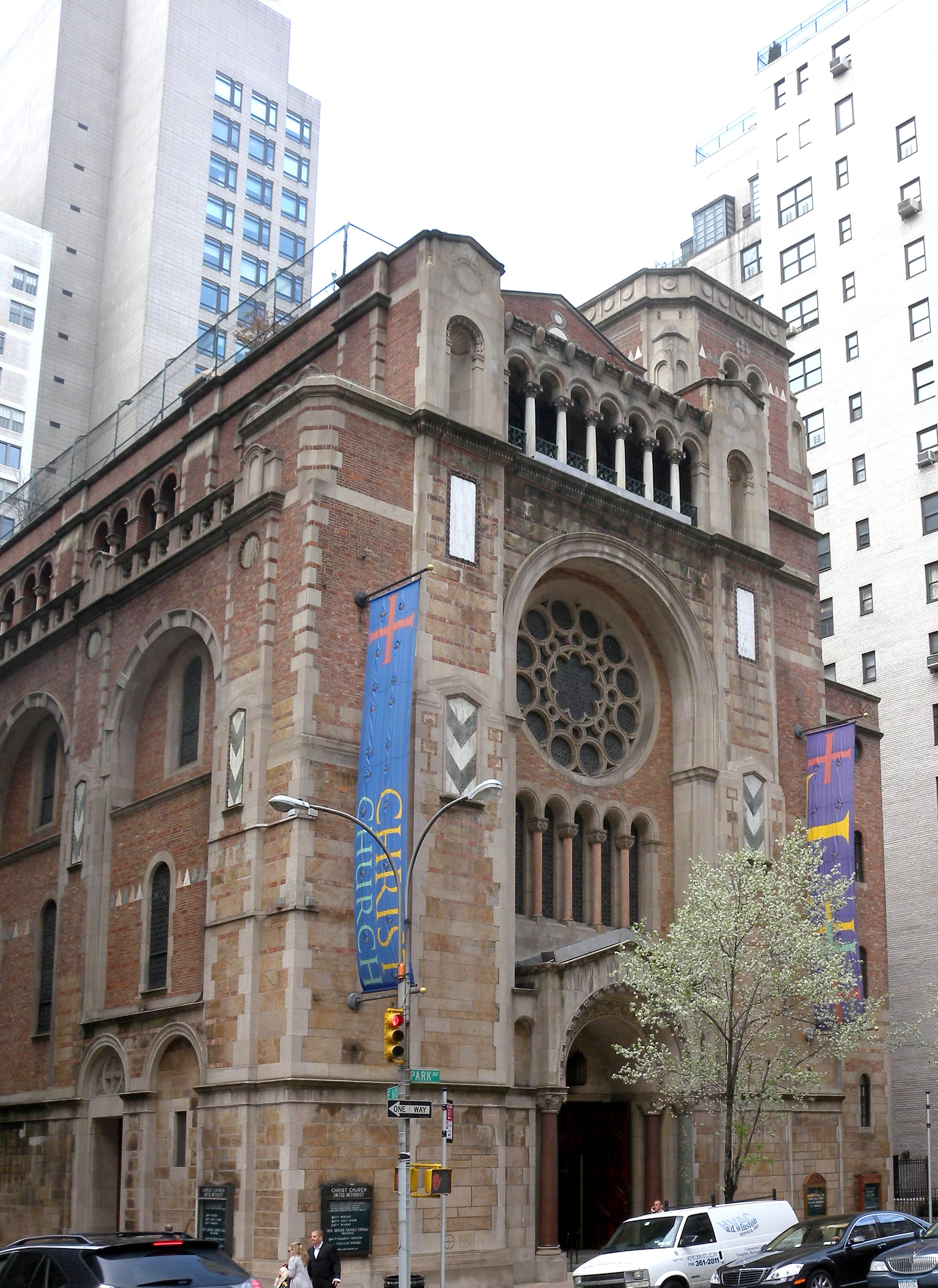
Christ Church United Methodist, New York City, United States

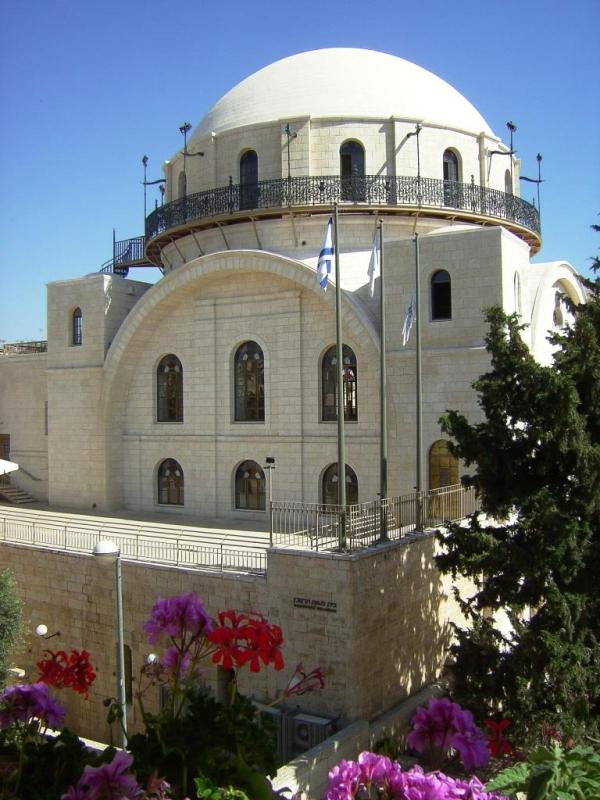
Hurva Synagogue, Jerusalem

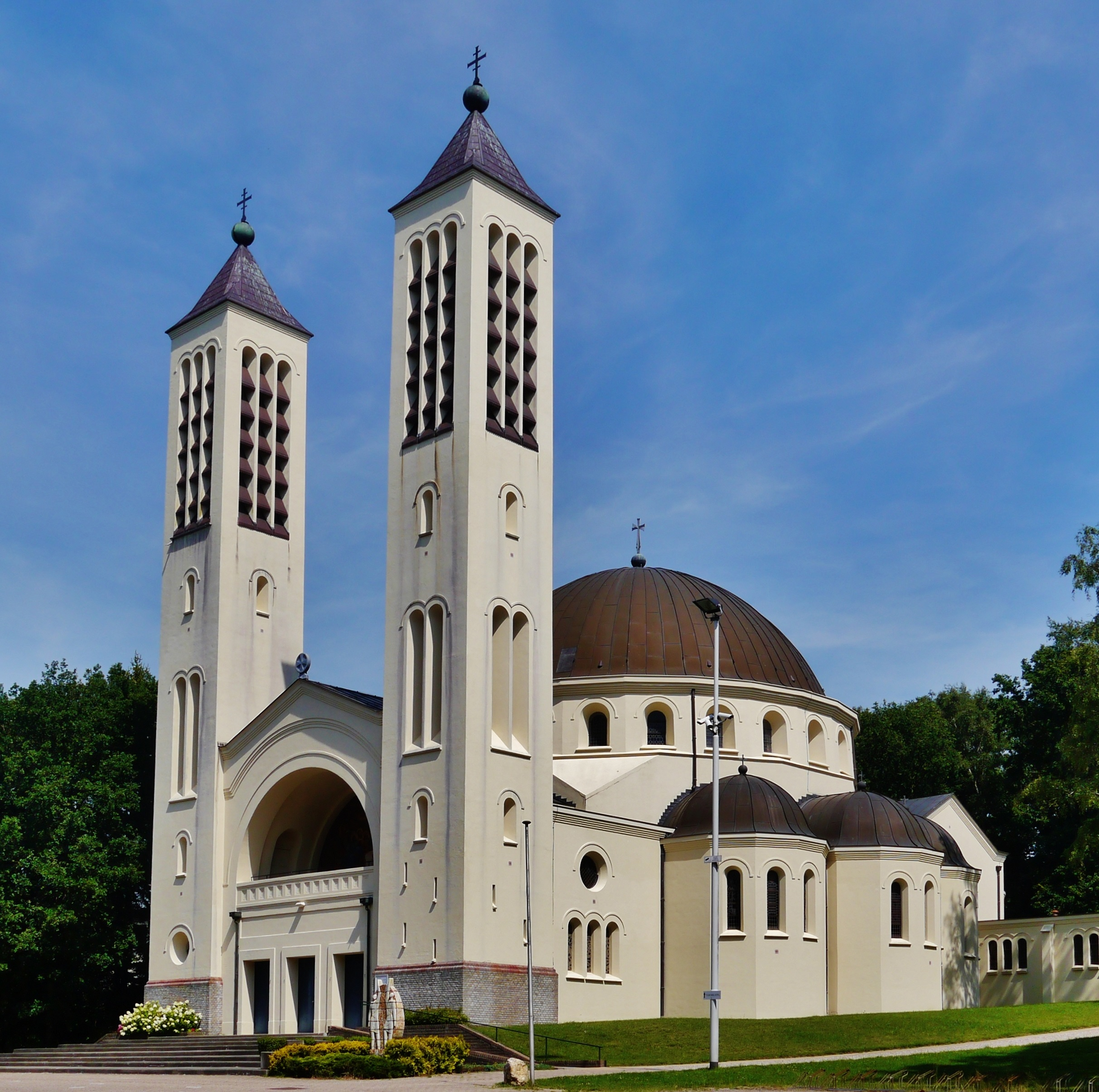
Cenakelkerk, Heilig Landstichting, The Netherlands

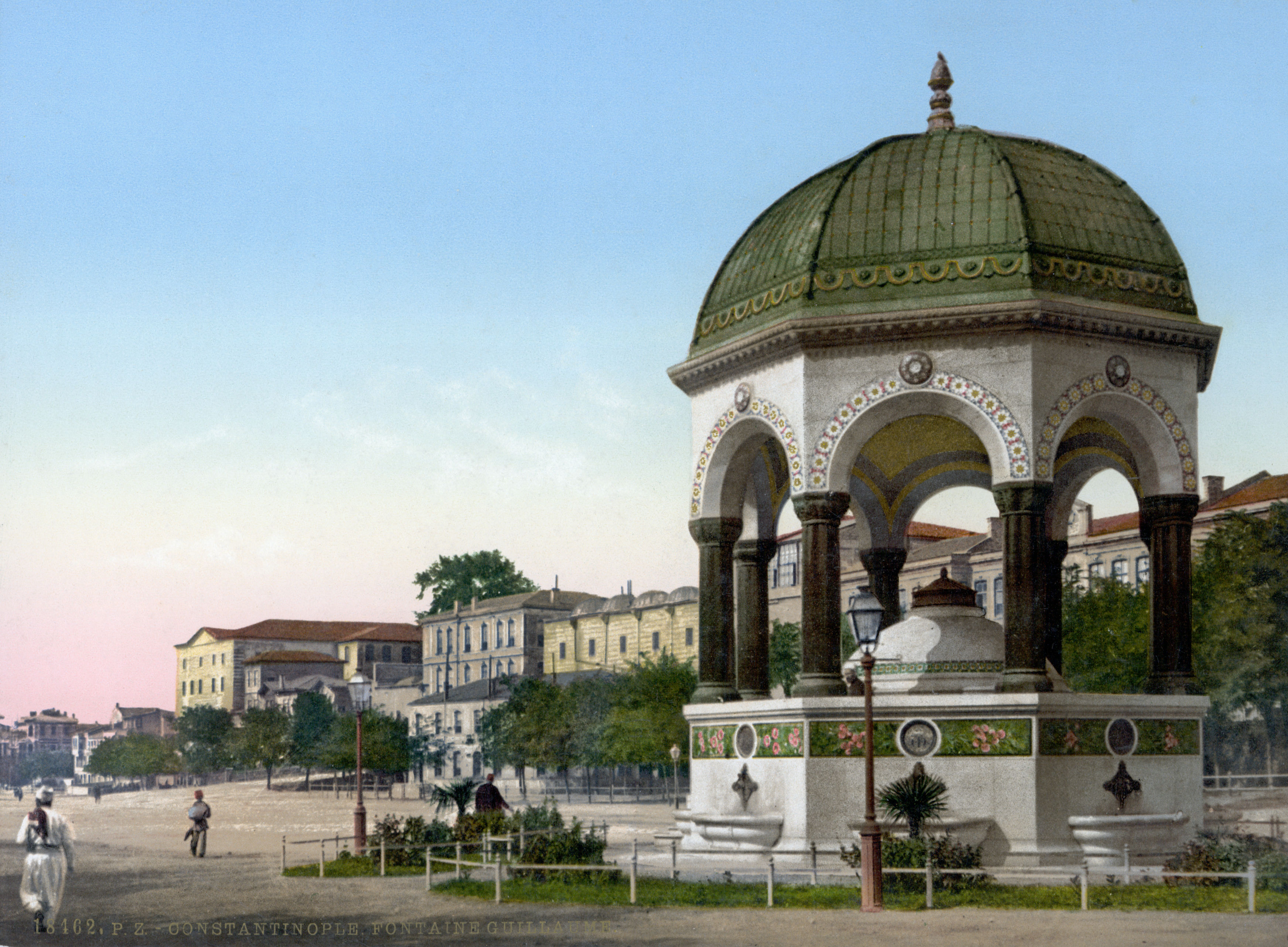
A historic photochrom print of the Fontaine Guillaume, which literally translates to "William (Wilhelm) Fountain", Istanbul

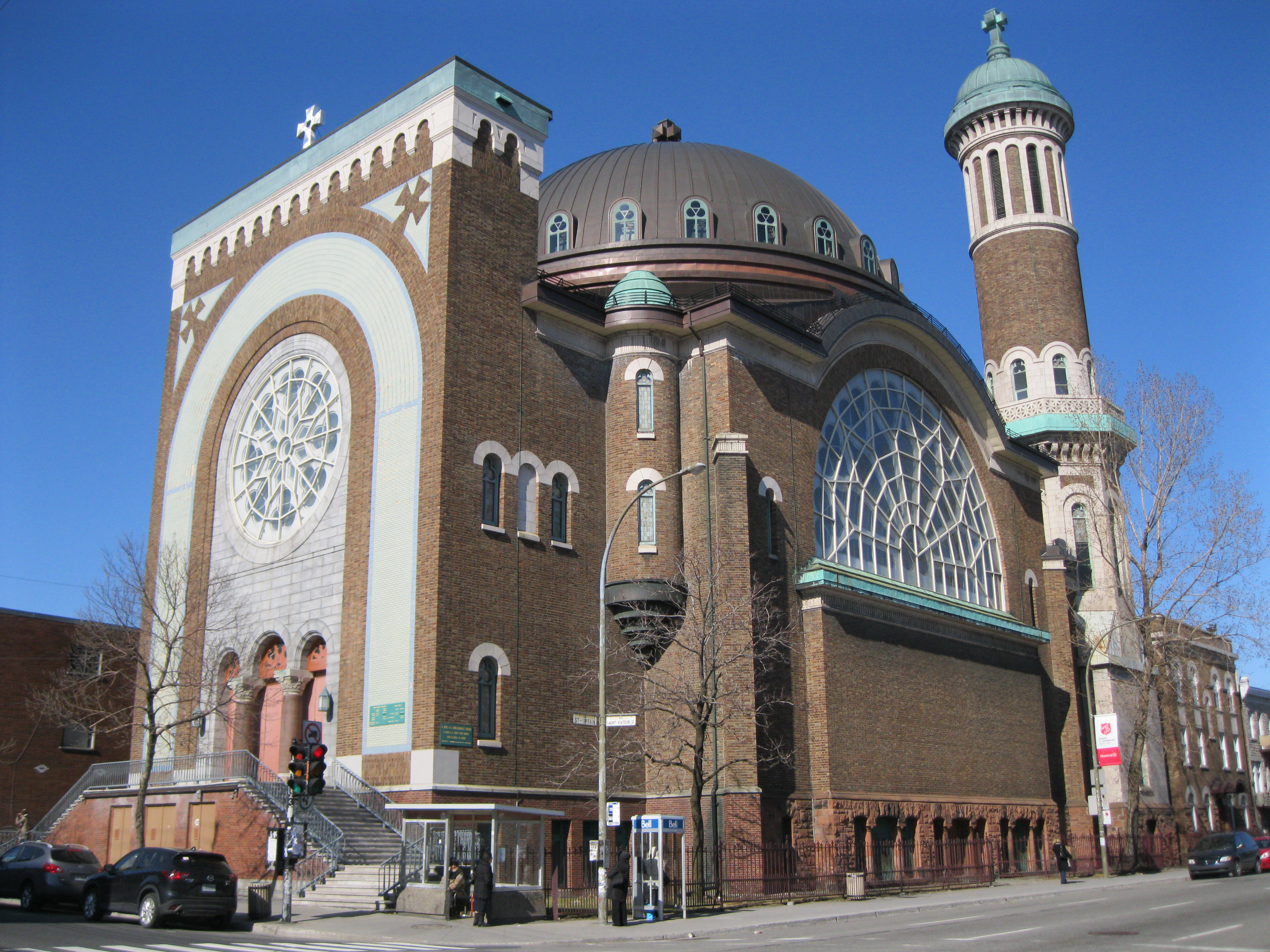
St. Michael and St. Anthony, Mile End, Montreal

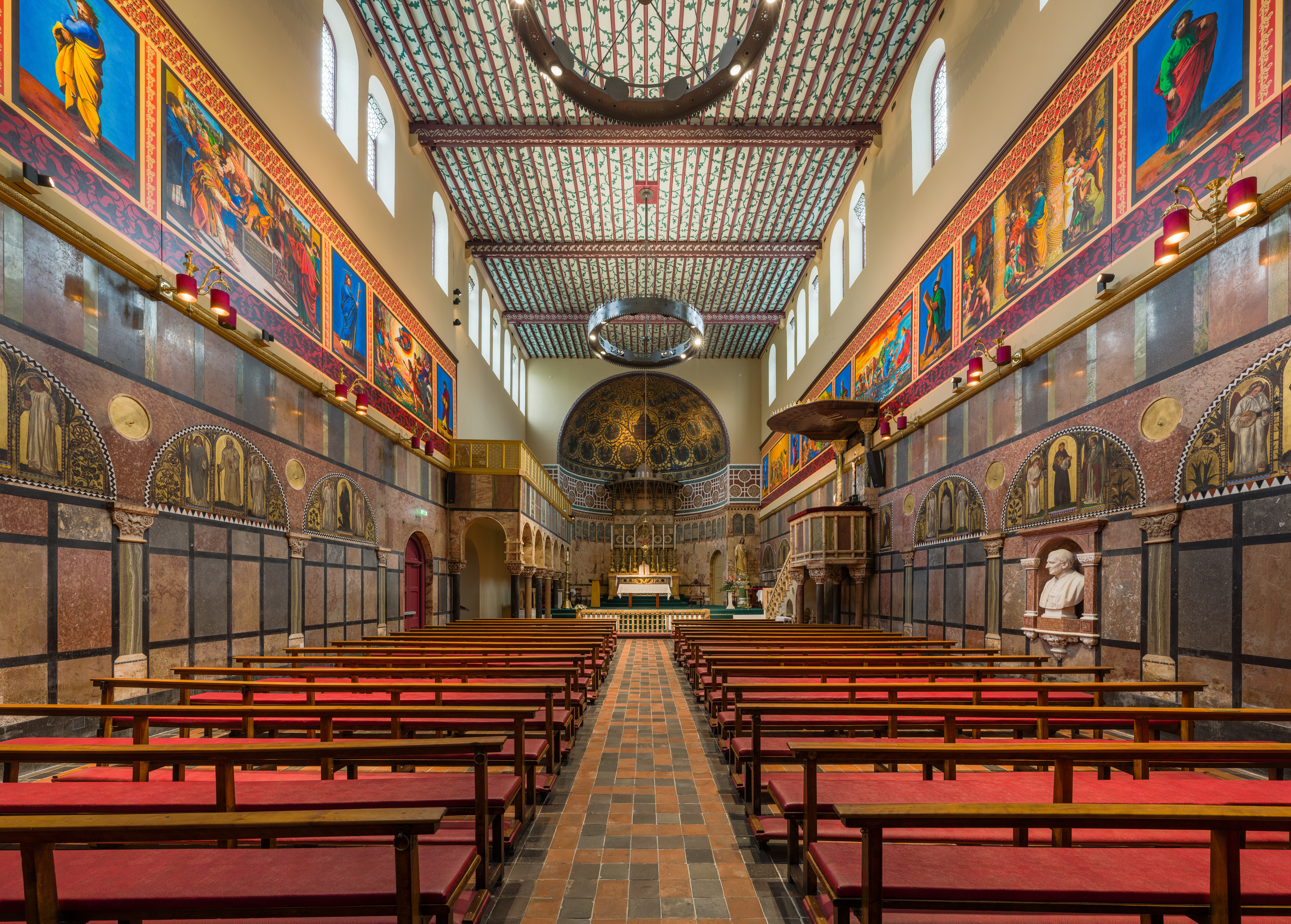
Interior of Church of Our Lady Seat of Wisdom, Dublin

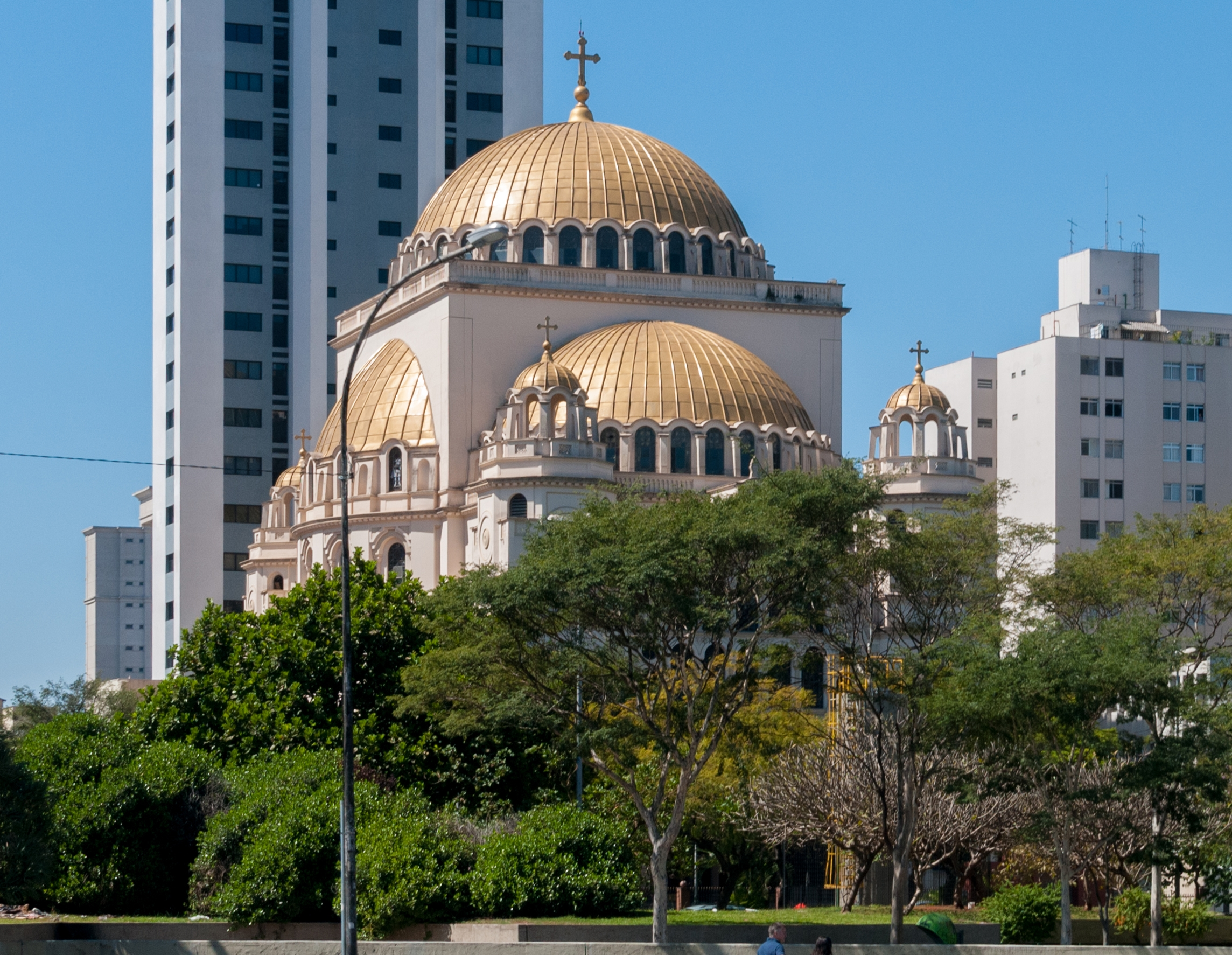
Orthodox Metropolitan Cathedral of São Paulo, São Paulo

== See also ==
- Romanian Revival architecture – combines Byzantine Revival with Art Nouveau and others
