= Sacred Heart Church (Berlin) =

- Herz-Jesu-Kirche
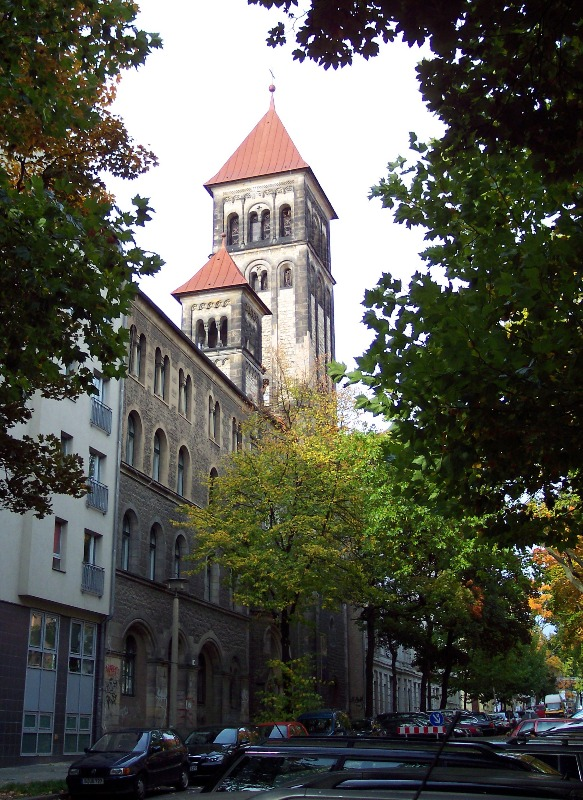
- Sacred Heart Church (Berlin)
- 52°31′50″N 13°24′34″E
- Location: Berlin
- Country: Germany
- Denomination: Roman Catholic
- Website: www.herz-jesu-kirche.de

History
- Founded: 1898

Architecture
- Architect: Christoph Hehl
- Architectural type: Neo-Romanesque
- Completed: 1896–1898

The Sacred Heart Church (German: Herz-Jesu-Kirche) is a Catholic church located in Berlin-Prenzlauer Berg, externally built in Neo-Romanesque style. Designed by Christoph Hehl, professor of medieval architecture, the building was completed after 16 months of constructions in 1898. The Neo-Byzantine-style murals inside the church were done by Friedrich Stummel.

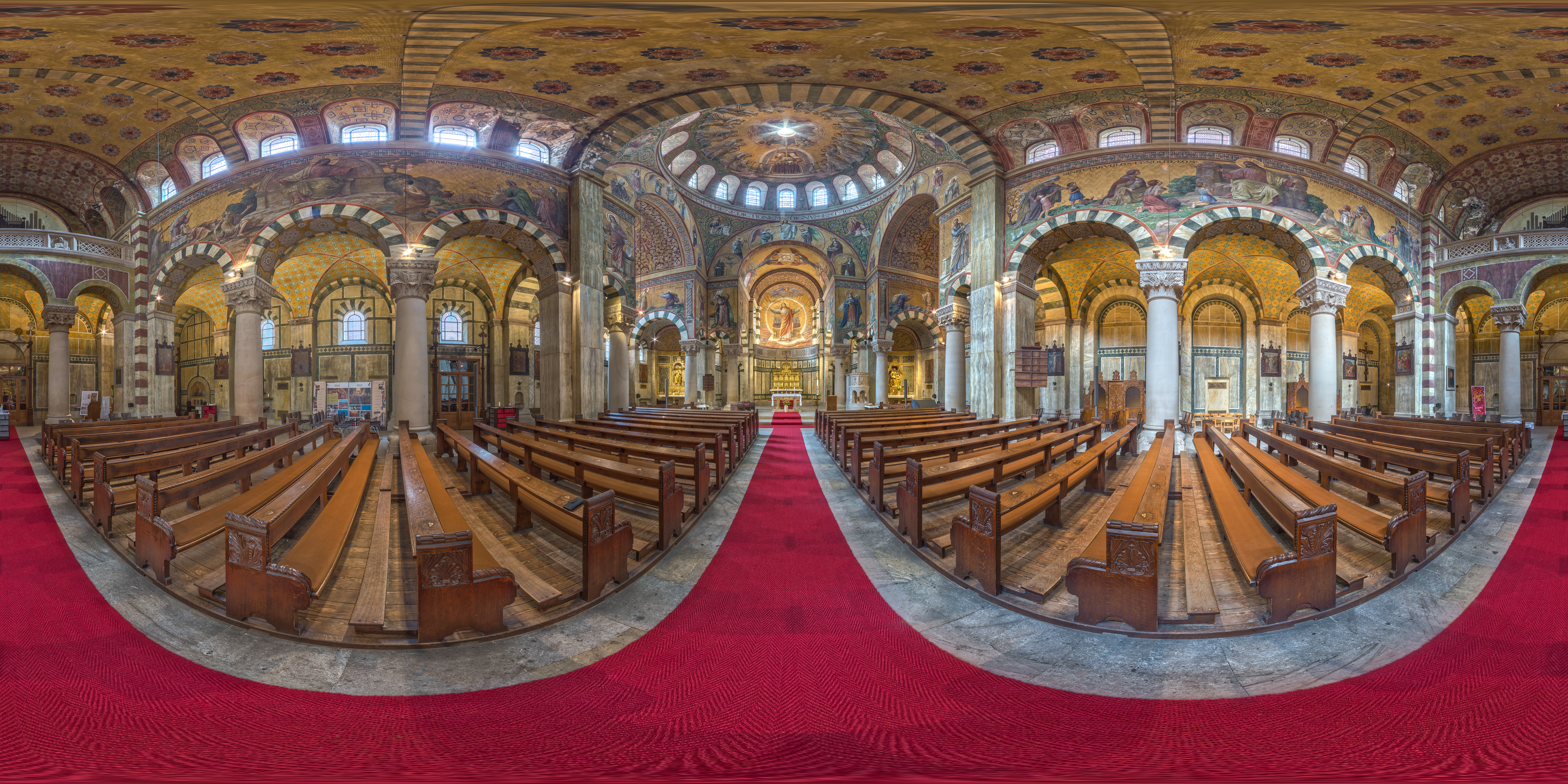
Panorama of the interior

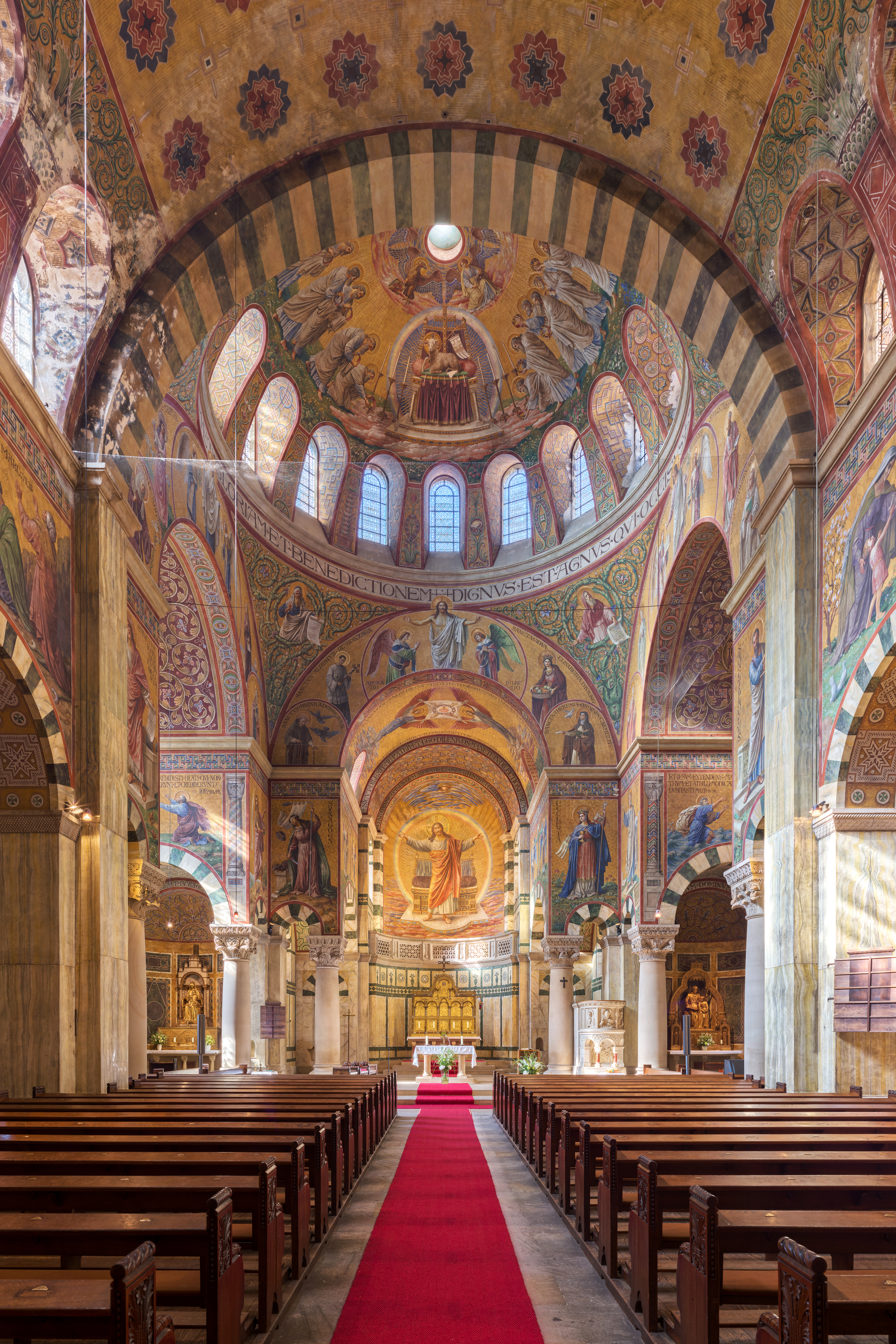
The altar surrounded by murals

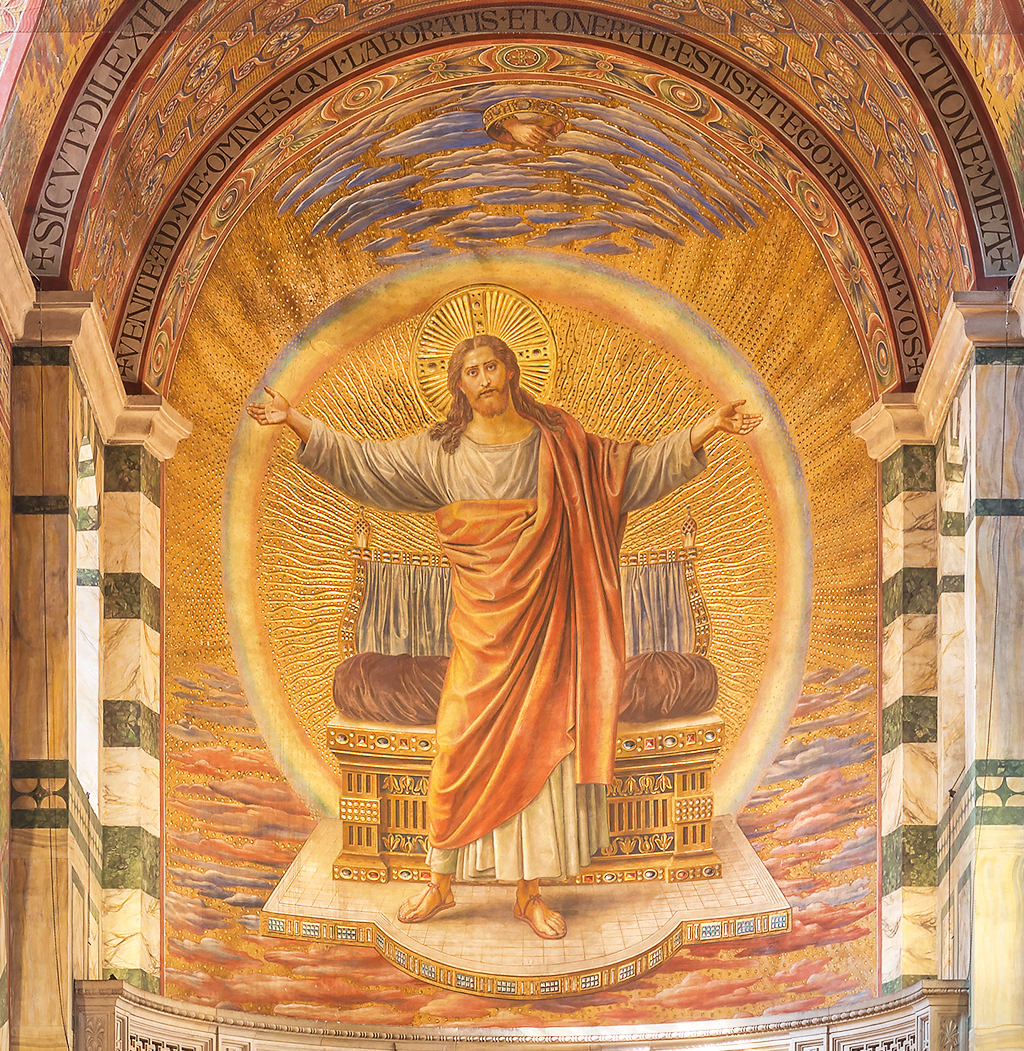
Jesus as Christ Pantocrator in the apse

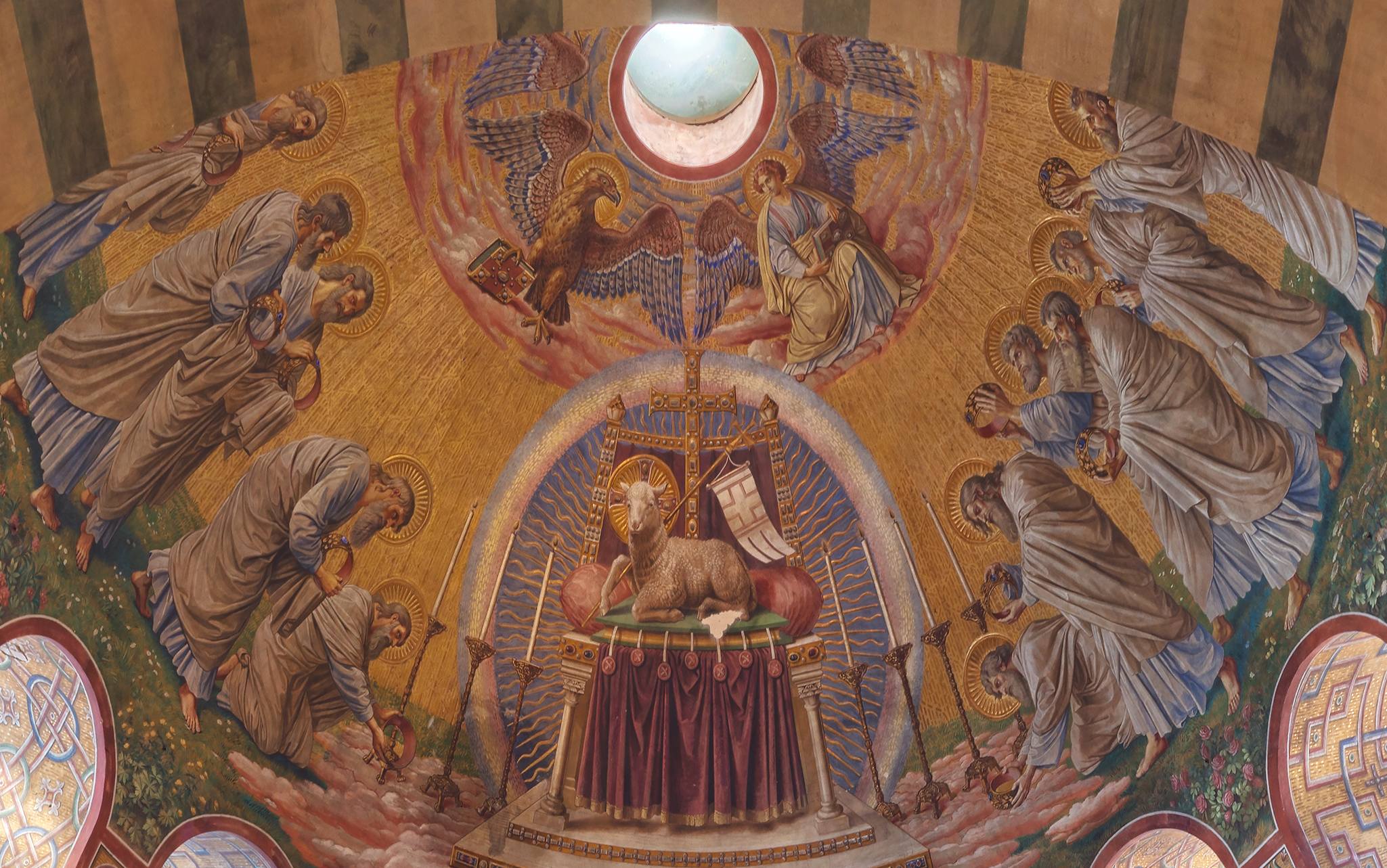
Mural of the Lamb of God with vexillum

== Themes of the murals ==
The murals of the church:

- Choir:
  - Apse: Jesus as Christ Pantocrator, above the Hand of God
  - Ceiling of the choir: Sacred Heart, carried by two angels
  - Walls of the choir: Angels carrying Instruments of the Passion
- Arch of the choir:
  - Risen Christ with two adoring angels
  - Saints of the local parish: Meinrad of Einsiedeln, Aloysius Gonzaga, Elizabeth of Thuringia, Teresa of Ávila
- On the archway (left and right):
  - Ecclesia and Synagoga
  - John the Baptist and Simon Petrus
  - John the Evangelist and Paul the Apostle
- Dome:
  - Lamb of God with the Seven seals and a vexillum, adored by 24 presbyters
  - Spandrels (left and right): The Prophets Malachi, Isaia, Ezekiel and Jeremiah
- Eastern transept:
  - Mary, Mother of Jesus with two angels, the saints Agnes of Rome, Gertrude of Nivelles and Saint Monica, her son Augustine of Hippo and the saint Hedwig of Silesia
- Western transept:
  - Saint Joseph, Alphonsus Liguori, Pope Leo I, the Doctor of the Church Augustine of Hippo and Bernard of Clairvaux
- Under the transept:
  - East side: Doubting Thomas with Jesus
  - West side: Simon Petrus sinking in the water, Jesus walking on water
  - East side of nave: Jesus and the Samaritan woman at the well
  - West side of nave: The sinner washing the feet of Jesus
  - Western wall of the central transept: Crucifixion of Jesus
  - Eastern wall does not have any murals
- Nave:
  - West side: Jesus as a friend of the children
  - Ostseite: Jesus is healing and comforting the needy

== Bibliography ==
- Irmtraud Thierse. "Katholische Kirche Herz-Jesu Berlin-Prenzlauer Berg". Förderkreis der Herz-Jesu-Kirche in Berlin Prenzlauer Berg e. V. 1998.
