= St. Bernward, Hanover =

St. Bernward
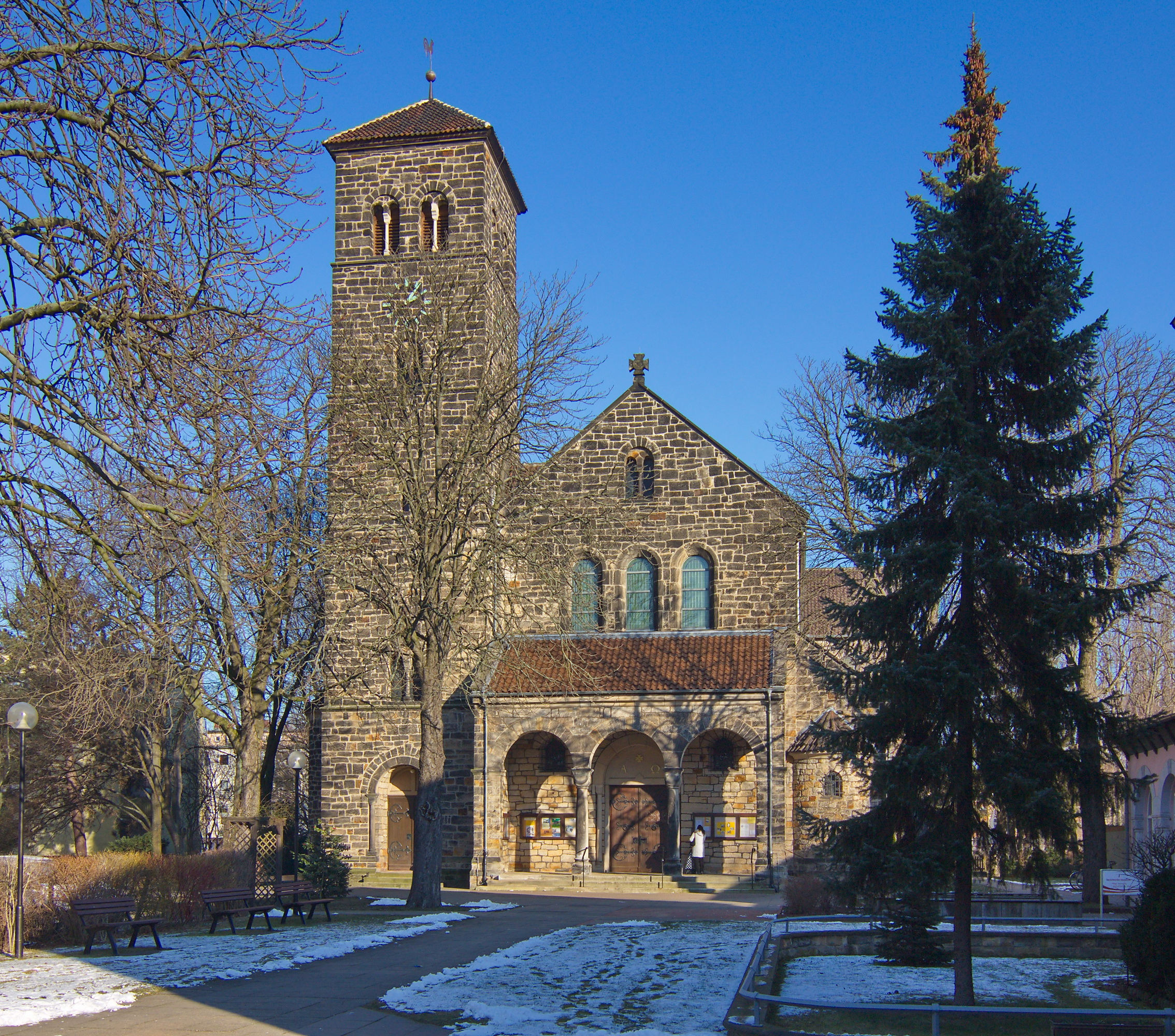
- St. Bernward, front

- Location within Lower Saxony Location within Germany
- 52°20′27″N 09°46′04″E
- Location: Hanover-Döhren, Lower Saxony
- Country: Germany
- Denomination: Catholic
- Website: www.st-bernward-hannover.de

History
- Dedication: Bernward of Hildesheim
- Consecrated: 8 September 1893

Architecture
- Functional status: Active
- Architect: Christoph Hehl
- Architectural type: basilica
- Style: Romanesque revival
- Completed: 1893

Administration
- Archdiocese: Hildesheim

St. Bernward is a Catholic church and parish in Döhren, part of Hanover, the capital of Lower Saxony, Germany. It was consecrated in 1893 to Bernward of Hildesheim, when part of Christoph Hehl's design of a basilica in Romanesque revival style were built, but was completed after World War II. Major artwork was added for the centenary in 1993. It became the centre of a larger parish in 2010.

== History ==
With industrialisation in the late 19th century, families especially from the Eichsfeld area increased the number of Catholics in Döhren. The only Catholic church of Hanover then was St. Clemens. In 1887, a Catholic school was built. The present church was designed by Christoph Hehl in Romanesque revival style as a basilica with three naves. In the beginning, only one nave was built, without transept and choir. The missing elements were added in 1959. The church was consecrated on 8 September 1893, dedicated to Saint Bernward. He had become bishop of Hildesheim 900 years earlier, and the consecration was performed by his successor Daniel Wilhelm Sommerwerck.

The parish grew further. The building survived the bombing of Hanover in World War II with only minor damage to the roof and windows. When the number of Catholics exceeded 8000 in 1955, caused by the arrival of many refugees from Silesia, the church was expanded, finally realising the original plans, with a transept and apse. It was completed in 1960. After the Second Vatican Council of 1962, the altar area was remodelled.

In 2010, the parish was merged with those of St. Eugenius in Mittelfeld and St. Michael in Wülfel to "Katholische Pfarrgemeinde St. Bernward, Hannover".

=== Organ ===
The organ was built in 1983 by Siegfried Sauer from Höxter, who retained former stops and the case dating back to 1894. It has 34 stops on two manuals and pedal.

=== Centenary ===
For the centenary in 1993, Hanns Joachim Klug created new artworks, including decoration of the apse and the Stations of the Cross. In the apse, he based his work on the oldest icon of Christ, held at Mount Athos. The depiction is accented by golden drapery and steel tubes forming a cross pattern. The stations of the cross are reduced to symbolic basic postures in sparse lines.
