= Eberhard Hillebrand =

German architect (1840–1924)

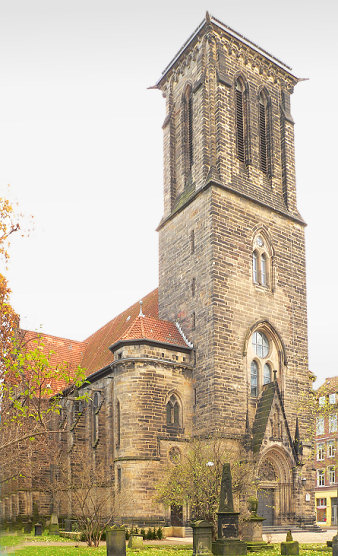
- Gartenkirche, Hannover
- Born: Rudolph Eberhard Hillebrand; 30 April 1840; Osnabrück, Kingdom of Hanover
- Died: 18 March 1924; Hannover, Germany
- Occupation: Architect
- Spouse: Louise von Sehlen (1878)
- Children: Gretlies Hillebrand/Hüncken and 4 recorded sons

Eberhard Hillebrand (30 April 1840 – 18 March 1924) was a German architect. Most of his surviving buildings are churches, many (but not all) of them in and around Hannover.

He also worked as a building contractor and city building inspector.

== Life ==
Eberhard Hillebrand was born in Osnabrück. His father was a master butcher. After attending school locally Hillebrand went on to train in bricklaying and stonework construction between 1856 and 1859, while simultaneously undertaking a study course during the three winter semesters at the Building Academy in Nienburg.

He relocated to Hannover in 1859, working in an architectural practice for Ludwig Debo and Hermann Hunaeus. In the same year, he enrolled to study Architecture at the Hannover Polytechnical Academy (as it was then known). He successfully completed these studies in 1863 and joined the large Architectural firm of Conrad Wilhelm Hase. In Autumn of that same year, he moved south to Kassel, attending courses given at what was then the Kassel Higher Business Academy by Georg Gottlob Ungewitter on Neo-Gothic architecture. He was given a job by Ungewitter the same year, but permitted to set out on a study tour covering Germany and France. In November 1864, Ungewitter himself died suddenly. Hillebrand returned to his deceased employer's office, and for the next two years worked on the completion of the commissions that had been in progress when Ungewitter died.

In 1866, he took a post as a BauKonducteur (building inspector), later promoted to "Government Master Builder" in the Flensburg Building Inspectorate. He resigned in 1872 and returned to Hannover where he worked as a self-employed building contractor and, on 4 June 1878, married Louise von Sehlen: the marriage would produce four recorded sons. In 1883 he was appointed a city building inspector, responsible for the city's Central Construction Department. In 1887, he resigned at his own wish in order to work full-time as a freelance architect. During the ensuring two decades he designed a succession of Neo-Gothic Protestant church buildings.

Eberhard Hillebrand died at his home in Hannover on 18 March 1924.
