= Friedrich Stummel =

German painter

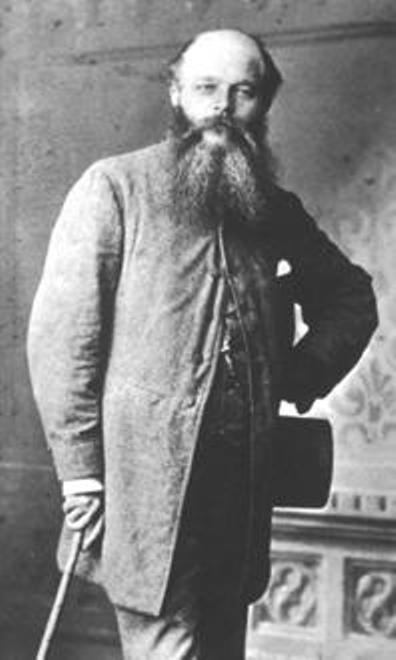
Friedrich Stummel (c.1900)

Friedrich Franz Maria Stummel (20 March 1850, Münster - 16 September 1919, Kevelaer) was a German religious artist, associated with the Nazarene movement and the Düsseldorfer Malerschule. In addition to his own paintings, he created designs that were employed by numerous glass painters, sculptors, and weavers.

== Life and work ==
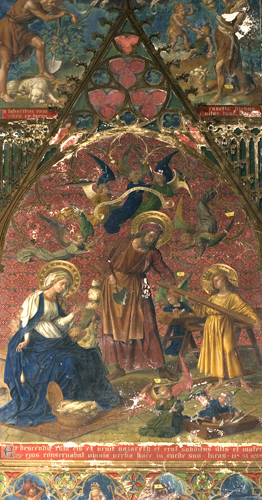
The Holy Family at Work

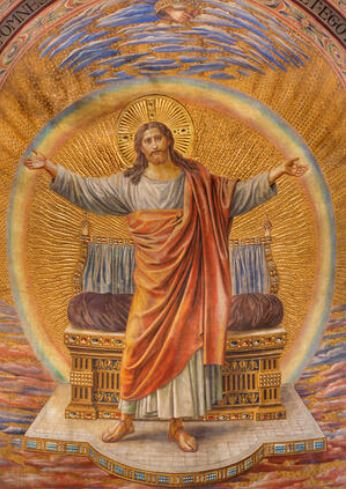
Jesus Christ, Sacred Heart Church, Berlin

He began his education at the Gymnasium Paulinum. Later, his family moved to Osnabrück, where he continued his studies. Due to his talent for drawing, he was able to gain admission to the Kunstakademie Düsseldorf at the age of sixteen, so he left school without getting his diploma.

He would study there for twelve years. His primary instructors were Ernst Deger and Eduard von Gebhardt. His first professional success came in 1878, when he was awarded a silver medal in London, at an exhibition in The Crystal Palace. That same year, the Akademie presented him with an award for his fresco painting.

He toured Italy in 1879. While there, he assisted Ludwig Seitz, who was painting frescoes in the choir at Treviso Cathedral. Upon returning to Germany, he worked with Friedrich Geselschap on a series of paintings at the Zeughaus in Berlin. They also collaborated on mosaic designs for the façade of the Kunstgewerbemuseum.

In 1881, he was commissioned to paint the Confessional Chapel in the pilgrimage city of Kevelaer. The following year, he moved there and bought a house, where his parents and his sister, Johanna, lived with him. In 1886, he opened a studio. He married Helene von Winkler (1867–1937) in 1890, and they had four children. In 1895, he provided designs for the Basilica of the Holy Apostles, Cologne, Notre-Dame Cathedral, Luxembourg, and the Cathedral Basilica of the Assumption, Pelplin. Other important works include series of paintings at the Rosary Basilica and the Sacred Heart Church; both in Berlin.

He was named a Knight in the Order of the Crown (1899), and the Order of St. Gregory the Great (1901). In 1905, he was offered a Professorship in Medieval painting at the Technische Hochschule in Charlottenburg (now Technische Universität Berlin), but declined to accept.

He had a stroke in 1918, and died from its complications the following year, aged sixty-nine.

== Sources ==
- Stummel, Friedrich. In: Friedrich von Boetticher: Malerwerke des neunzehnten Jahrhunderts. Beitrag zur Kunstgeschichte. Vol.2, Dresden 1898, pg.861
- Gregor Hövelmann: "Friedrich Stummel. Eine Lebensskizze", In: Der Kirchenmaler Friedrich Stummel (1850–1919) und sein Atelier. Exhibition catalog, Niederrheinischen Museums für Volkskunde und Kulturgeschichte Kevelaer, 1979, pp. 15–28
- Astrit Grittern: "Die Marienbasilika zu Kevelaer", Arbeitsheft der rheinischen Denkmalpflege #52, Rheinland-Verlag ISBN 3-7927-1798-0, pp. 35–36
