= Christoph Hehl =

German architect and academic teacher

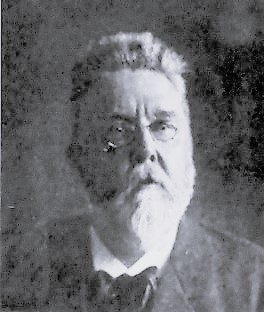
- Born: 11 October 1847; Kassel, Electorate of Hesse
- Died: 18 June 1911 (aged 63); Charlottenburg, German Empire
- Occupations: Architect; Academic teacher
- Organizations: Technische Hochschule Berlin

Christoph Carl Adolf Hehl (11 October 1847 – 18 June 1911) was a German architect and academic teacher who focused on church buildings. He was professor of medieval architecture at the Technische Hochschule in Berlin.

== Life and career ==
Born in Kassel, Hehl was the son of the inspector of the Höhere Gewerbeschule there, Johannes Hehl (1800–1884). His brother was Maximilian Emil Hehl. He attended the Gewerbeschule from 1862 to 1866, focused on building (Bauwesen). Among his teachers were Georg Gottlob Ungewitter and Paul Zindel. After military service, he studied in England. When he returned, he worked in the architect's office of Edwin Oppler in Hanover, who had been a student of Conrad Wilhelm Hase and Eugène Viollet-le-Duc. Hase's work influenced him, but reports that Hehl had studied with him at the Polytechnikum have remained unsubstantiated.

In 1872, founded his own architectural firm in Hanover. He was appointed professor of medieval architecture (mittelalterliche Baukunst) at the Technische Hochschule in Berlin-Charlottenburg, holding the post until 1910. Hehl, who was Catholic, became one of the leading builders of churches in Berlin, besides August Menken and Max Hasak. His design are mostly in Romanesque Revival style. He collaborated with the sculptors Carl Dopmeyer and Ferdinand Hartzer, among others, and influenced many of his colleagues. His students include Heinrich Jennen, Carl Kühn, Otto Lüer and Stephan Mattar.

Hehl died in Charlottenburg on 18 June 1911 at age 63. Kühn completed projects that were unfinished then, and has been regarded as his successor as church architect.

== Works ==
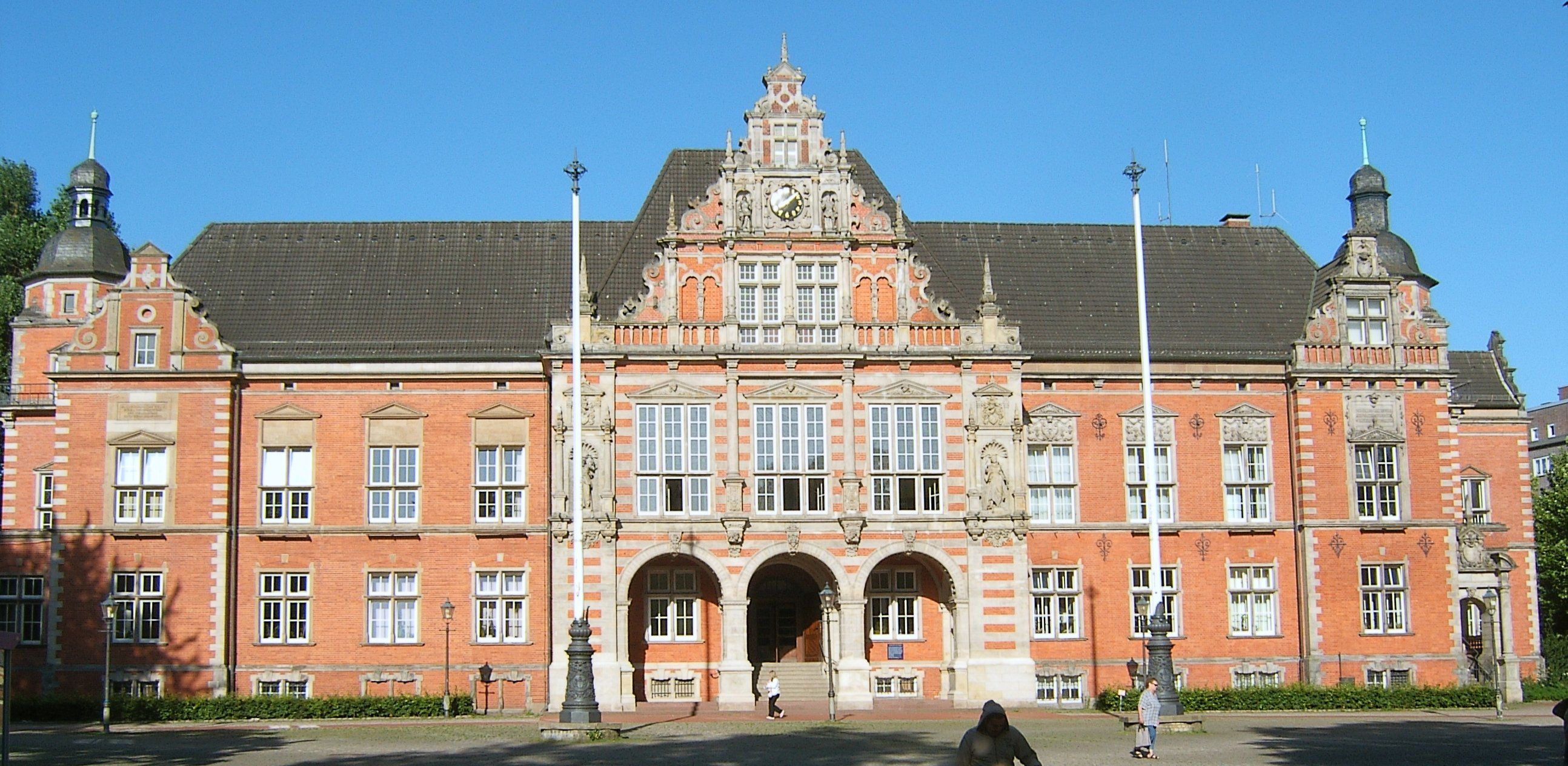
Harburg town hall

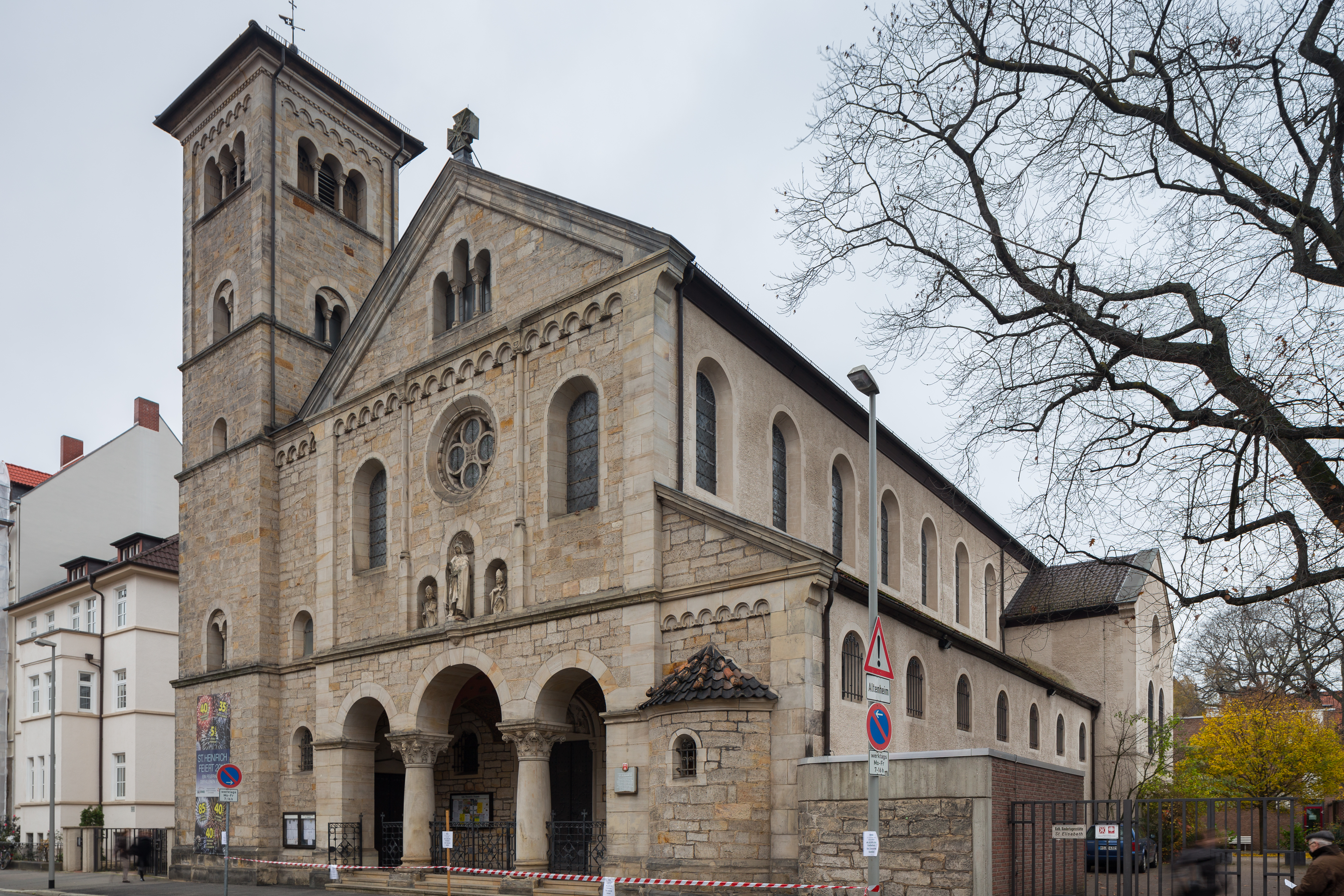
St. Elisabeth, Hanover

Works by Hehl include:

- 1873–1874: St. Godehard, Hanover-Linden
- 1880: Residence for Adalbert Grüter, Bünde
- 1883–1884: Old Linden town hall
- 1883–1884: Herrenhaus Gestorf
- 1889–1892: Harburg town hall (in Weserrenaissance style)
- 1892–1893: St. Bernward, Hanover-Döhren
- 1894–1895: St. Elisabeth, Hanover
- 1899–1900: Rosenkranz-Basilika, Berlin-Steglitz
- 1912 (completed): Mater Dolorosa, Berlin-Lankwitz (completed by Kühn)
