= Kłodzko Synagogue =

Former Reform synagogue in Glatz, Germany, now Kłodzko, Poland

Synagogue of Kłodzko
- German: Synagoge in Glatz
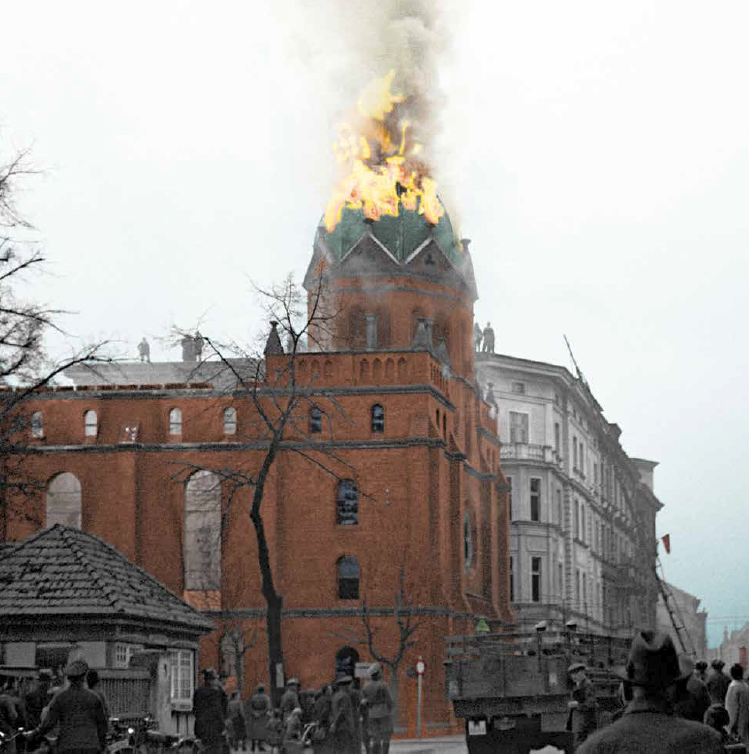
- The desecrated synagogue, following Kristallnacht, November 1938

- Location of the former synagogue in Germany, as it was in 1937

Religion
- Affiliation: Reform Judaism (former)
- Ecclesiastical or organisational status: Synagogue (1885–1938)
- Status: Destroyed

Location
- Location: Grünestraße, Glatz (now ul. Wojska Polskiego, Kłodzko)
- Country: Germany (now Poland)
- Coordinates: 50°26′13″N 16°39′03″E

Architecture
- Architect: Albert Grau
- Type: Synagogue architecture
- Style: Moorish Revival; Brick-Gothic Revival
- Completed: 1885
- Destroyed: November 1938 (during Kristallnacht)

Specifications
- Direction of façade: West
- Capacity: 254 seats; plus women's gallery
- Dome: One

The Kłodzko Synagogue, officially the Synagogue of Kłodzko, and formerly the Synagogue in Glatz (German: Synagoge in Glatz), was a former Reform Jewish congregation and synagogue, located on the Grünestraße (Green Street), in Glatz, Germany. This location is now Wojska Polskiego Street, in Kłodzko, in Kłodzko County in Lower Silesia, Poland.

The synagogue was completed in 1885 and destroyed by Nazis on November 9, 1938, during Kristallnacht.

== History ==
The synagogue was built on the initiative of Progressive Jews, according to the plans of architect Albert Grau (1837–1900) of Breslau (now Wrocław), a student of Georg Gottlob Ungewitter, in the Moorish Revival and Brick-Gothic Revival styles.

From 1742 Kłodzko was part of the Kingdom of Prussia, then Germany, until Silesia became Polish under border changes promulgated at the 1945 Potsdam Conference. During the November Pogrom (9 November 1938), termed "Kristallnacht" in German Nazi propaganda, the synagogue was destroyed in an arson attack by German Nazi gangs.

== Commemorations ==
Reinhard Schindler, a former Glatz citizen, developed the idea of having a memorial stone placed for the synagogue. The memorial stone was erected in 1995 with an anodised aluminum plaque in Polish, Hebrew and German commemorating the destroyed synagogue. The inscription reads:

Here stood the Glatz synagogue, desecrated and burned by the Nazis in the Pogrom Night of November 9, 1938.

— Former German and current Polish citizens in 1995 – 50 years after the end of the war.

=== Sculpture ===
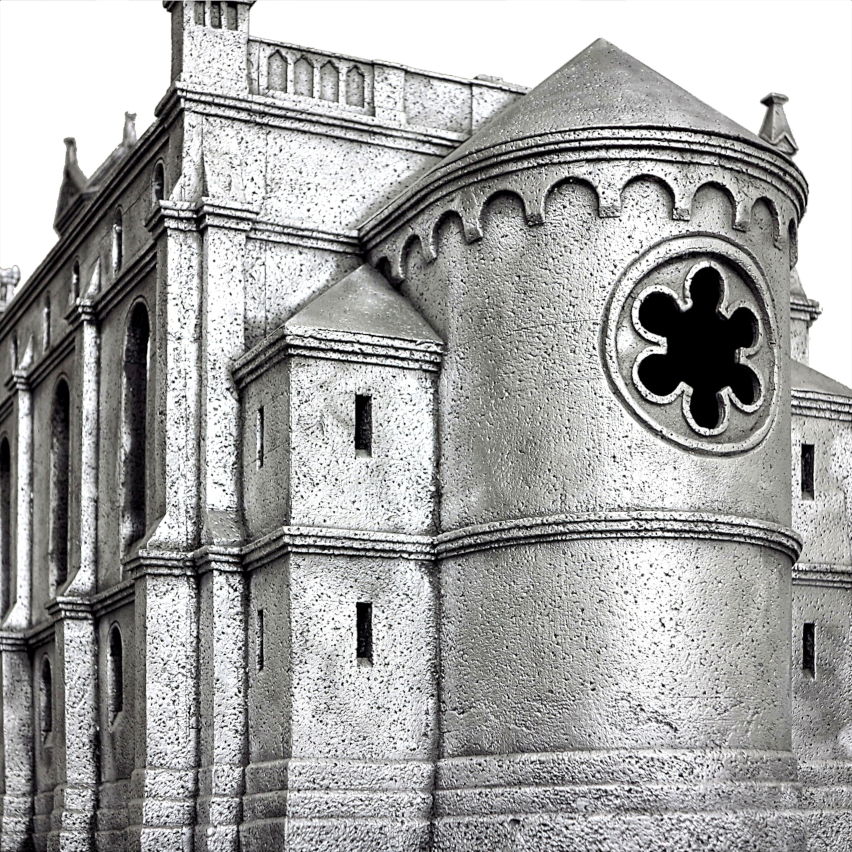
Kłodzko Synagogue cast-aluminium sculpture; view from south

In 2015–2016, the German sculptor Gerhard Roese of Darmstadt created a sculpture of the synagogue made of cast aluminium weighing approx. 100 kilograms (220 lb). The collected materials, plans and sketches, together with photos and a description of the burning of the temple, was published as a book by Roese under the title: Decalogue on Fire. The artistic work under the same title includes the sculpture of the synagogue, a sculpture of the Ten Commandments above the portal, and a sculpture of one of the cast-iron gallery columns that collapsed during the fire in its rubble and ash bed. In addition, fifteen 1 × 1 meter (3.3 × 3.3 foot) large panels of photographs by Günter Veit and a synagogue with a fragment of a Torah scroll, probably stolen in Poland by a member of the Wehrmacht. In May 2018, Roese brought the entire work to Kłodzko with the help of a group of young people and donated it to the city. The sculpture and other materials from the exhibition of Roese were also in 2018 in the project Topography of Terror installed in Berlin and published in a catalog.

=== Synagogue revival ===
On the anniversary of the Reichsprogromnacht, also Kristallnacht on November 8, 2018, the Muzem Ziemi Kłodzkiej w Kłodzku (Museum of the Kłodzko Land), together with the sculptor from Darmstadt and the Polish activists Michał Cyprys, Henryk Grzybowski, Mieczysław Kowalcze and Grzegorz Sadowski, hosted an event commemorating the terror of 80 years ago and the former Jewish community under the motto Synagoga Reviva. Gerhard Roese talked about his idea and implementation of the sculpture model of the synagogue.

Students from various schools in Kłodzko and a group of adults participated. They learned what is known about the structure and its destruction today, as well as that of two surviving ladies, Ruth Prager and Shoshana Efrati, who had visited the synagogue in their childhood. Henryk Grzybowski told about their fate from former Glatz, to Chile and Israel.

After a small concert with Yiddish and Hebrew songs performed by Sylwia Grzybowska, those in attendance went to the synagogue memorial stone and lit candles.

=== Commemorative plaque ===
On January 26, 2019, a commemorative plaque with content in three languages was stolen from its stone. On March 22, 2019, a new stone tablet financed from contributions from the community of Kłodzko and former German residents was unveiled.

== Gallery ==
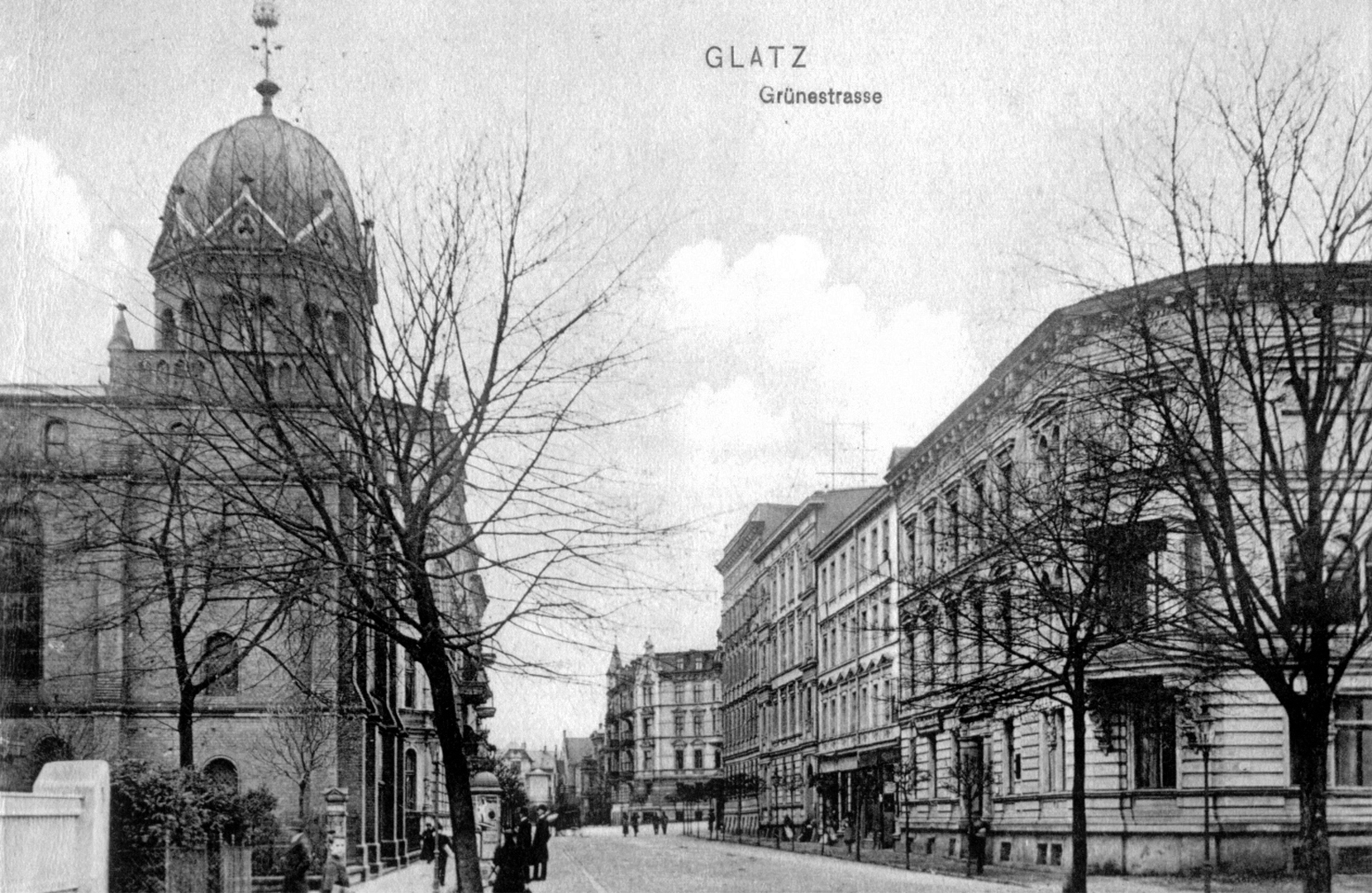
Synagogue (on the left)

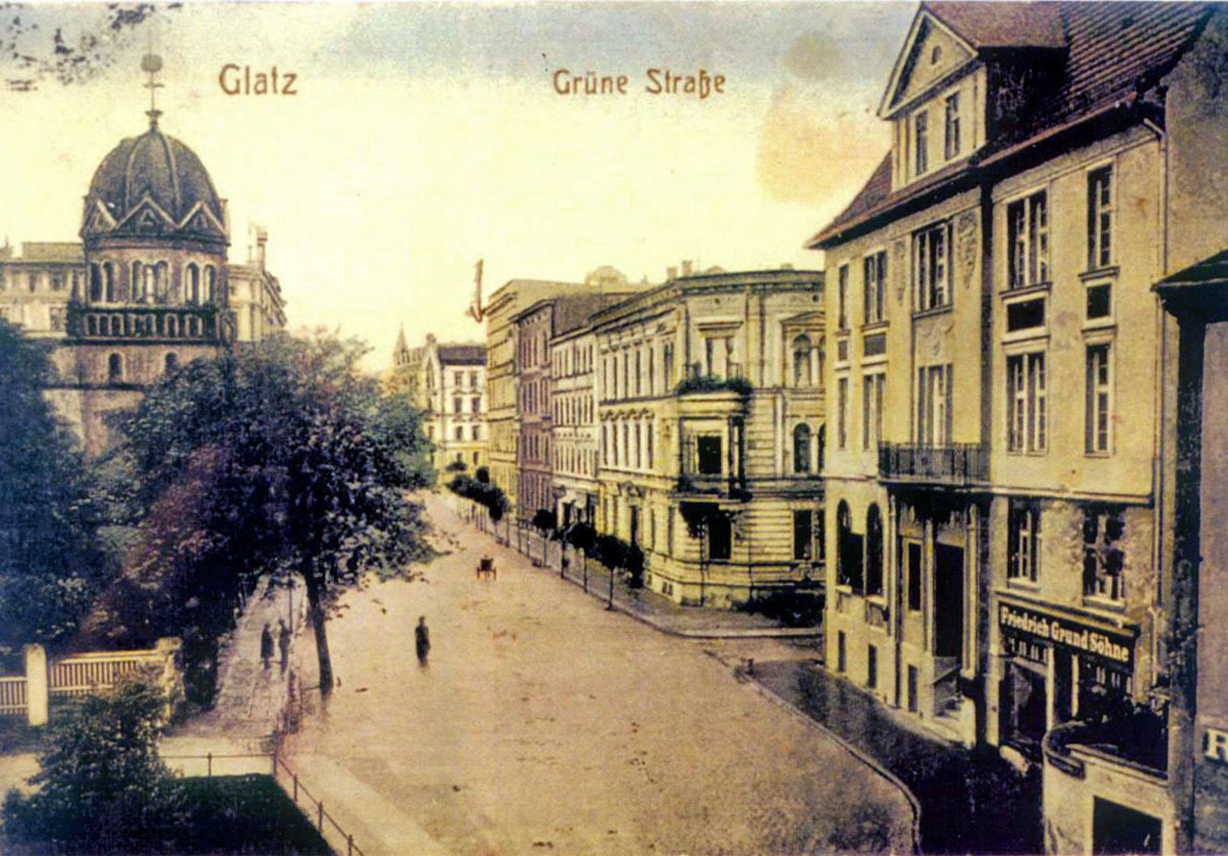
Synagogue (on the left)

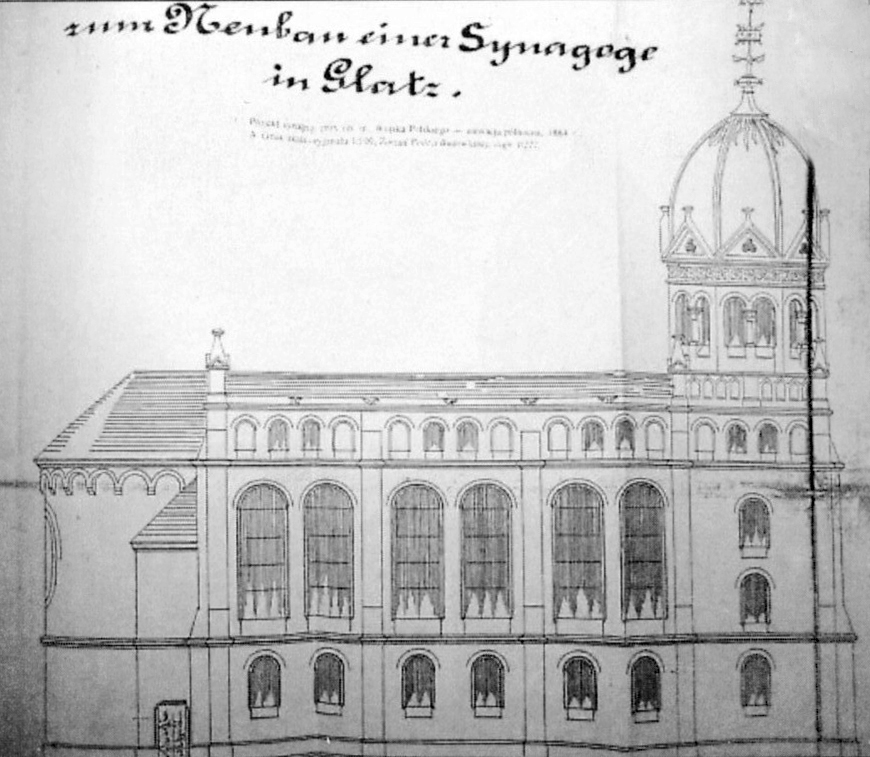
Horizontal projection of the west facade

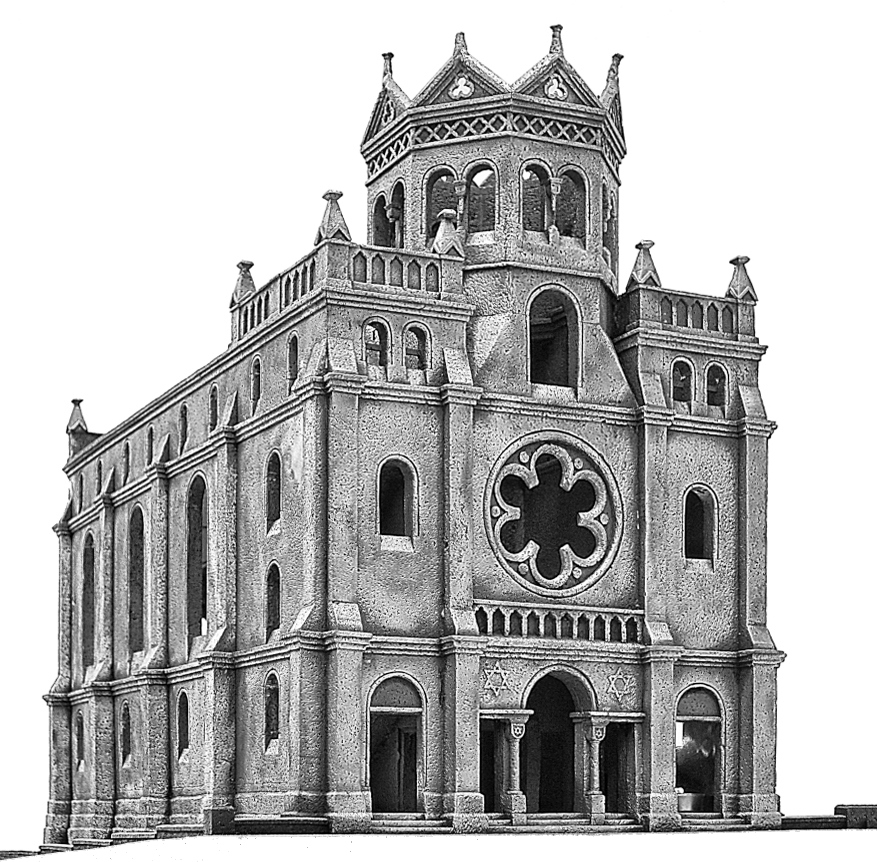
Gerhard Roese. Kłodzko Synagogue cast-aluminium sculpture; view from the street

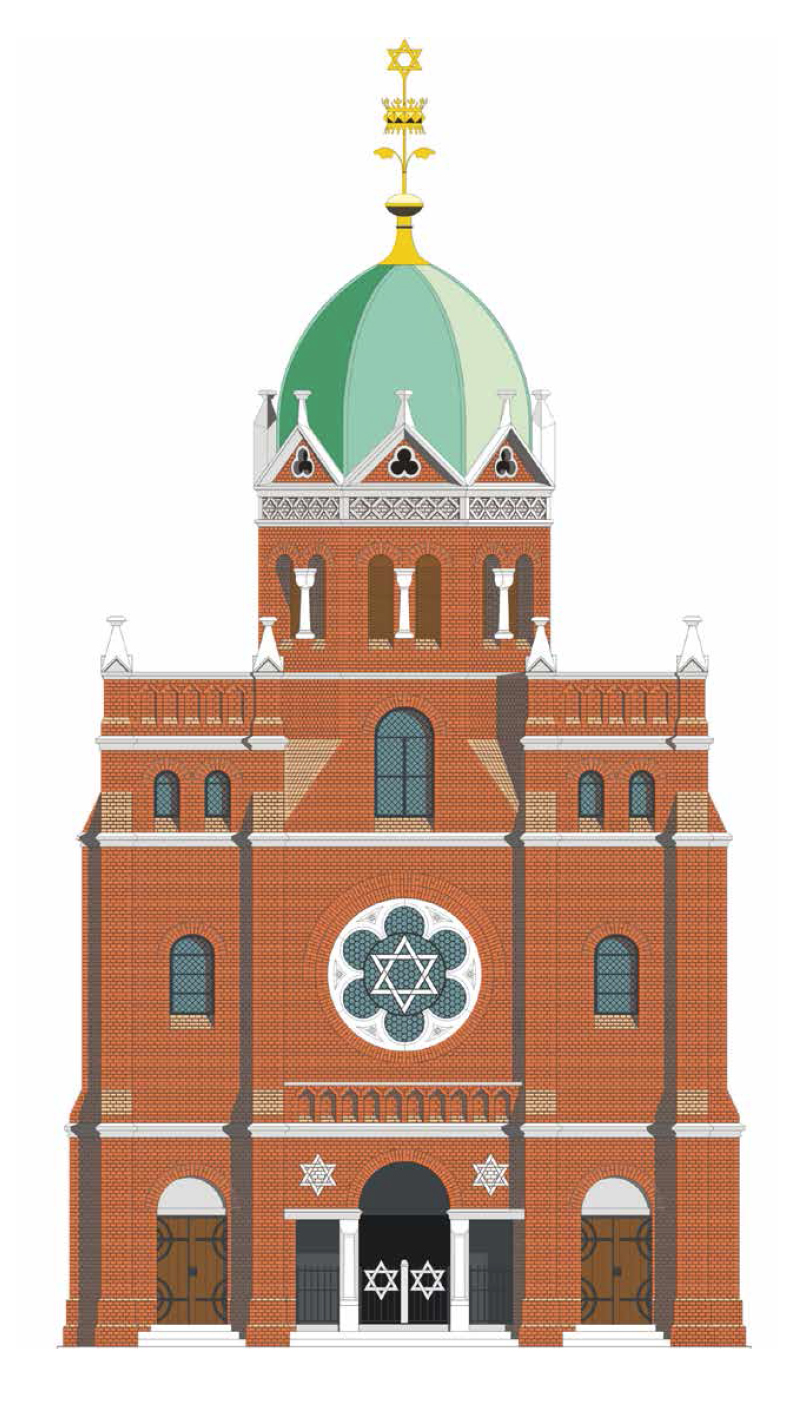
A Gerhard Roese-designed model of the former synagogue, dated 2017

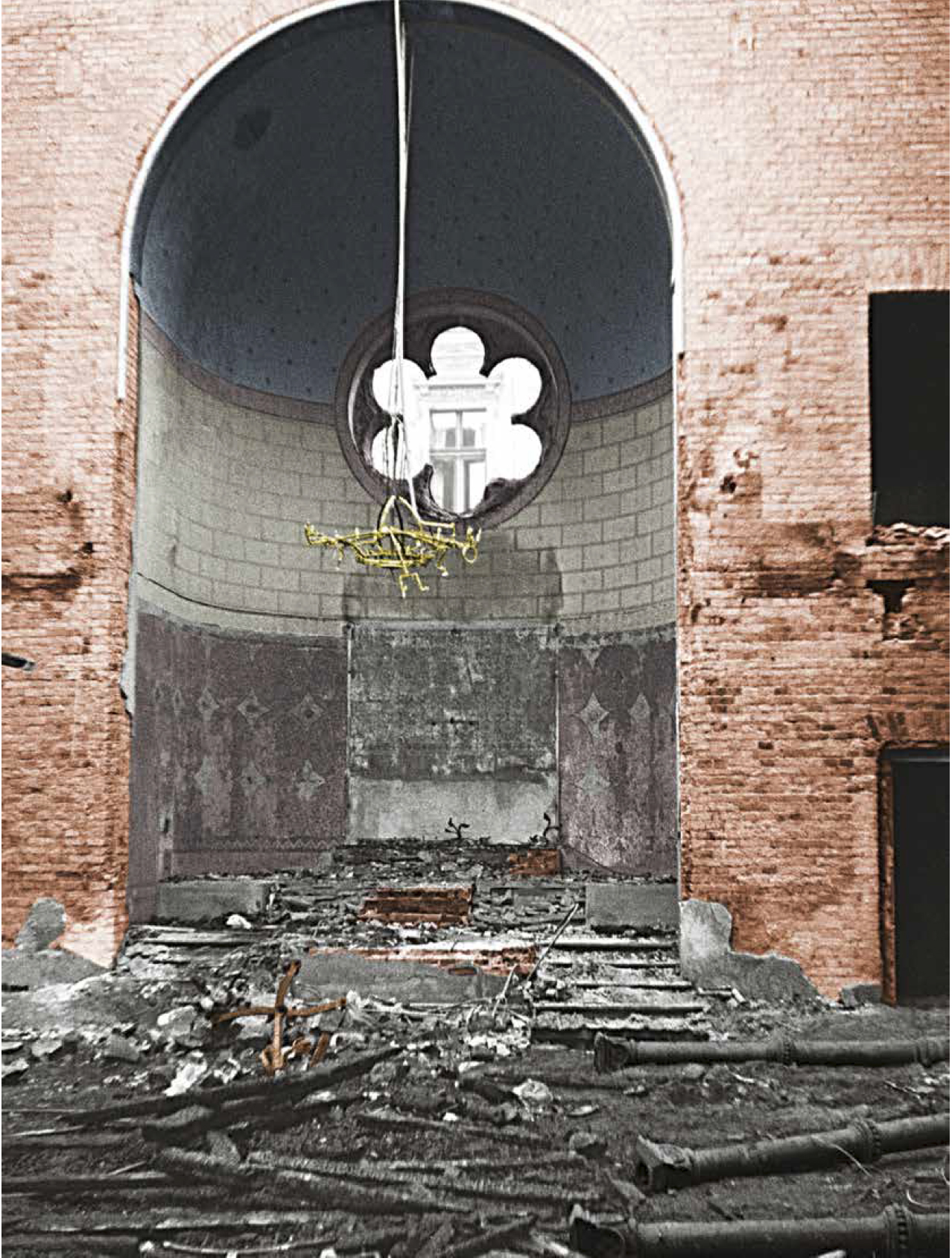
Synagogue inside after Kristallnacht

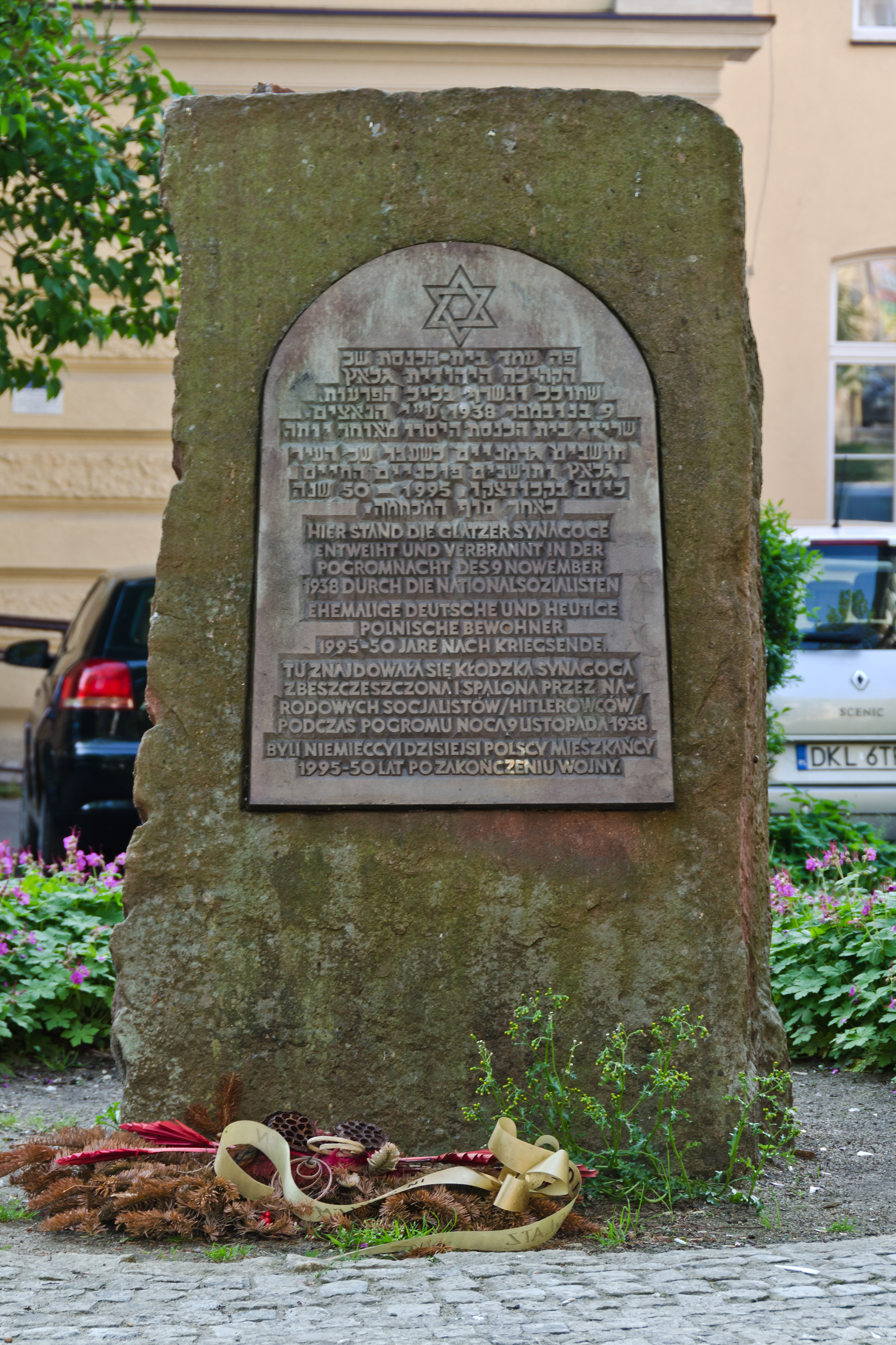
The memorial stone after the synagogue

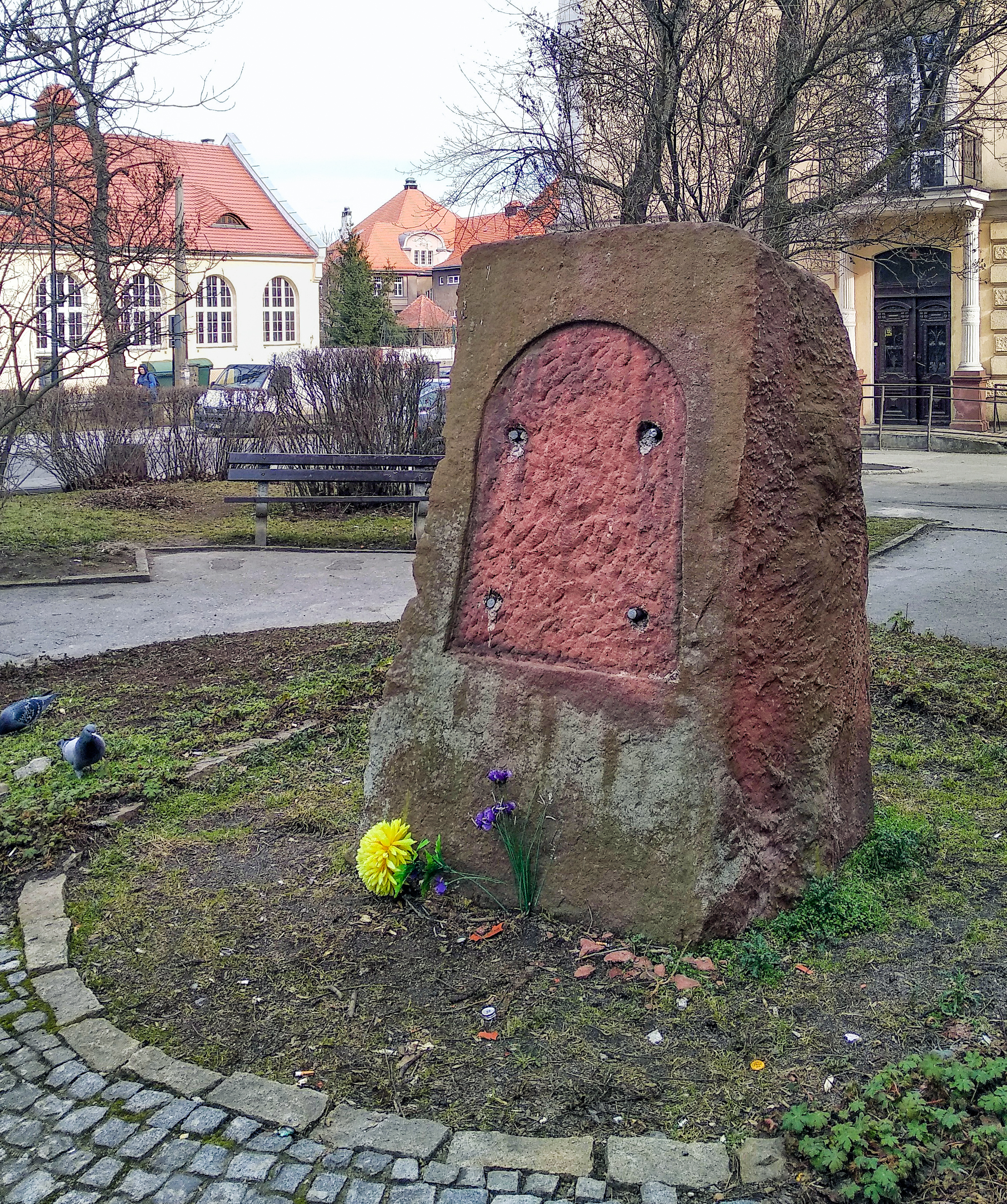
The memorial stone without the commemorative plaque

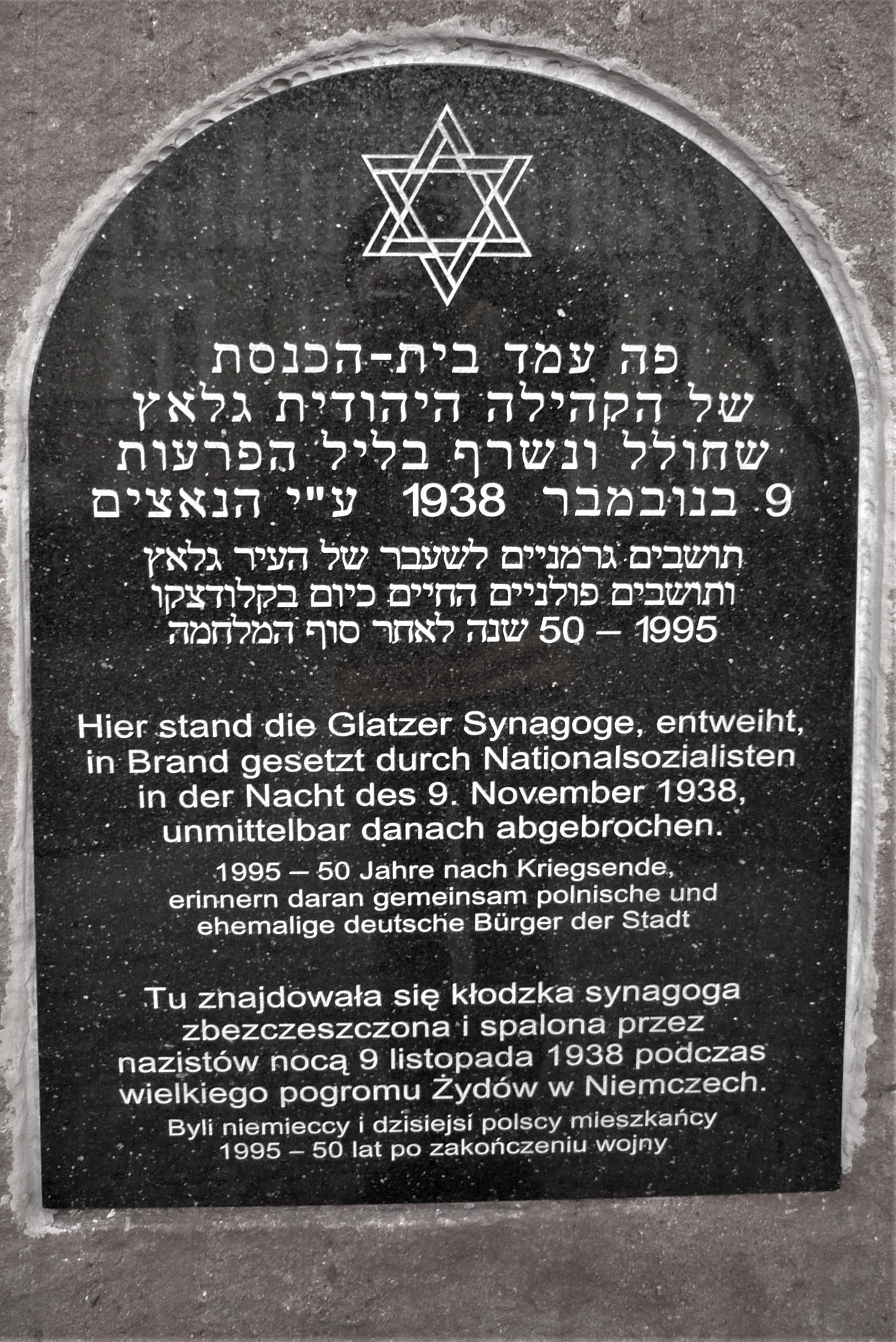
The new commemorative plaque

== See also ==
- History of the Jews in Germany
- History of the Jews in Poland
- List of synagogues in Germany (in German)
- List of synagogues in Poland
