= Ungewitter =

Ungewitter is a surname. Notable people with the surname include:

- Georg Gottlob Ungewitter (1820–1864), German architect
- Kurt Ungewitter (1891–1927), German pilot
- Richard Ungewitter (1869–1958), German naturist
