= Basilica of St. Clement =

Basilica of St. Clement may refer to:

- The Basilica of San Clemente al Laterano in Rome
- St. Clement's Basilica, Hanover, in Germany
