= Rosary Basilica (Berlin) =

- Rosenkranz-Basilika
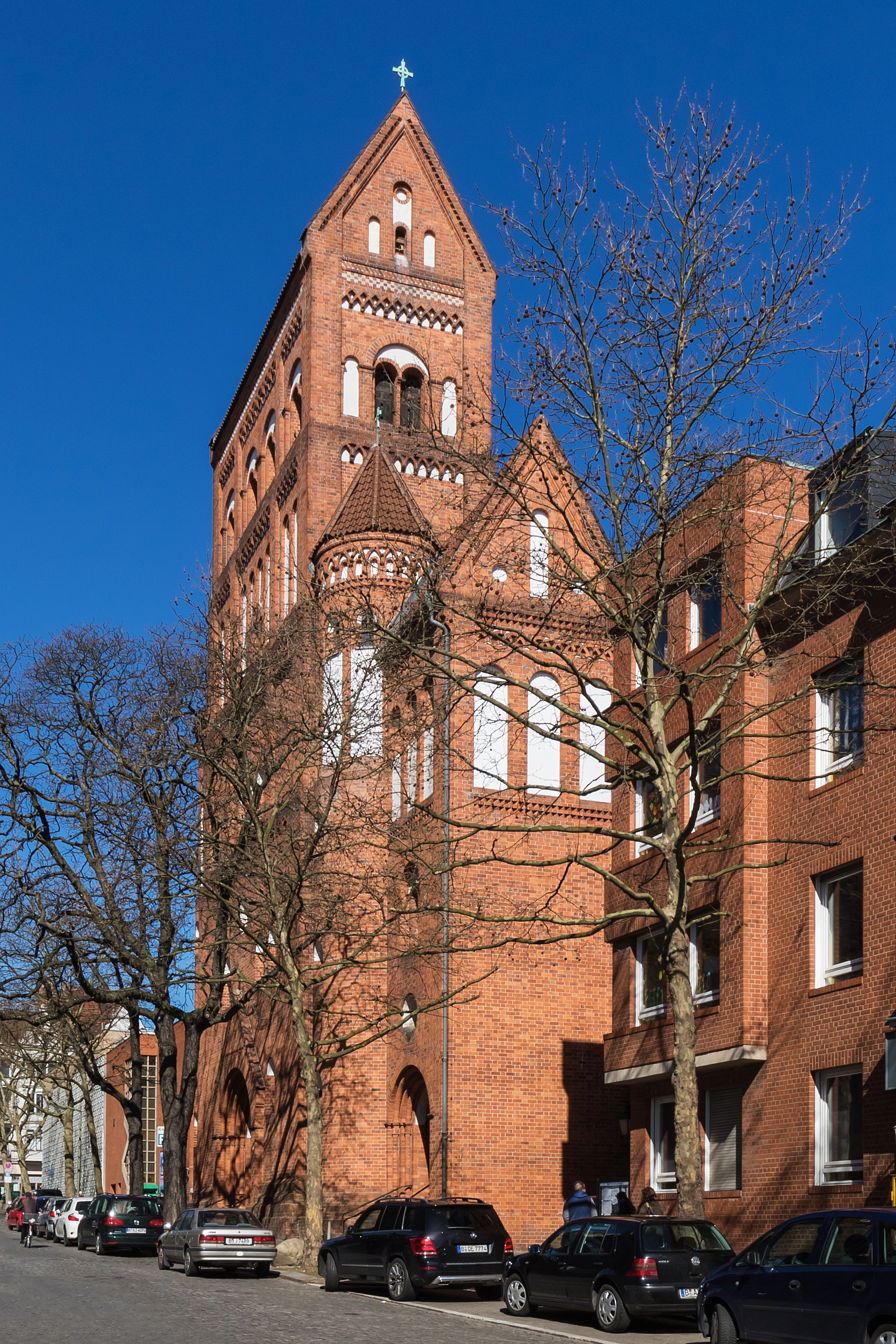

- Location within Berlin Location within Germany
- 52°27′32″N 13°19′27″E
- Location: Berlin
- Country: Germany
- Website: www.rosenkranz-basilika.de

History
- Founded: 1899

Architecture
- Architect: Christoph Hehl
- Architectural type: Neo-Romanesque
- Completed: 1900

The Rosary Basilica (German: Rosenkranz-Basilika) is a Catholic church in Berlin-Steglitz. Designed by Christoph Hehl, professor of medieval architecture, the Neo-Romanesque-style building was completed in 1900. After surviving World War II without any damages, the church was appointed Minor Basilica by Pope Pius XII. The ornate murals inside the church were begun by Friedrich Stummel and, after his death, completed by his former students.

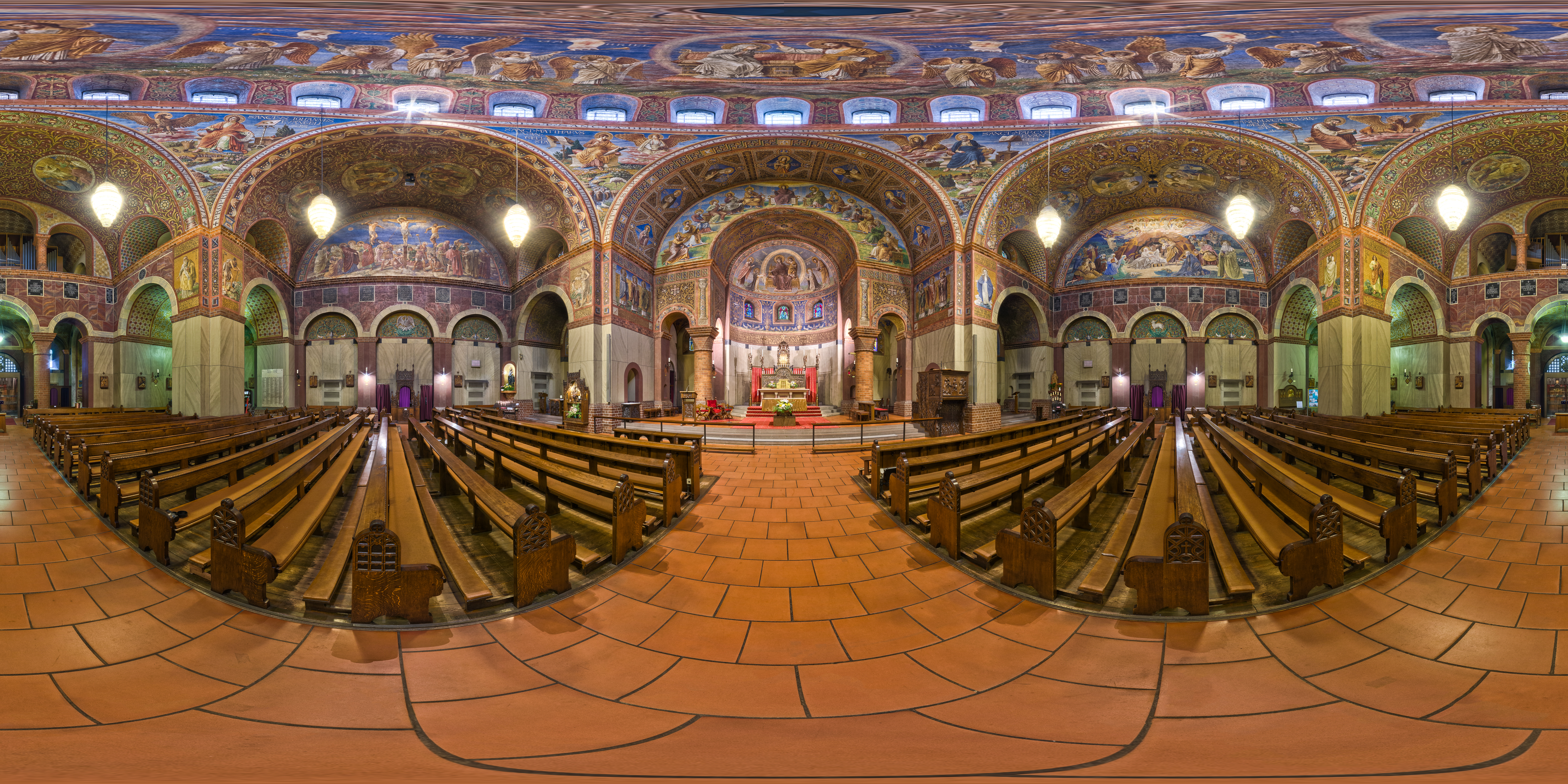
Panorama of the interior (view as a 360° interactive panorama)

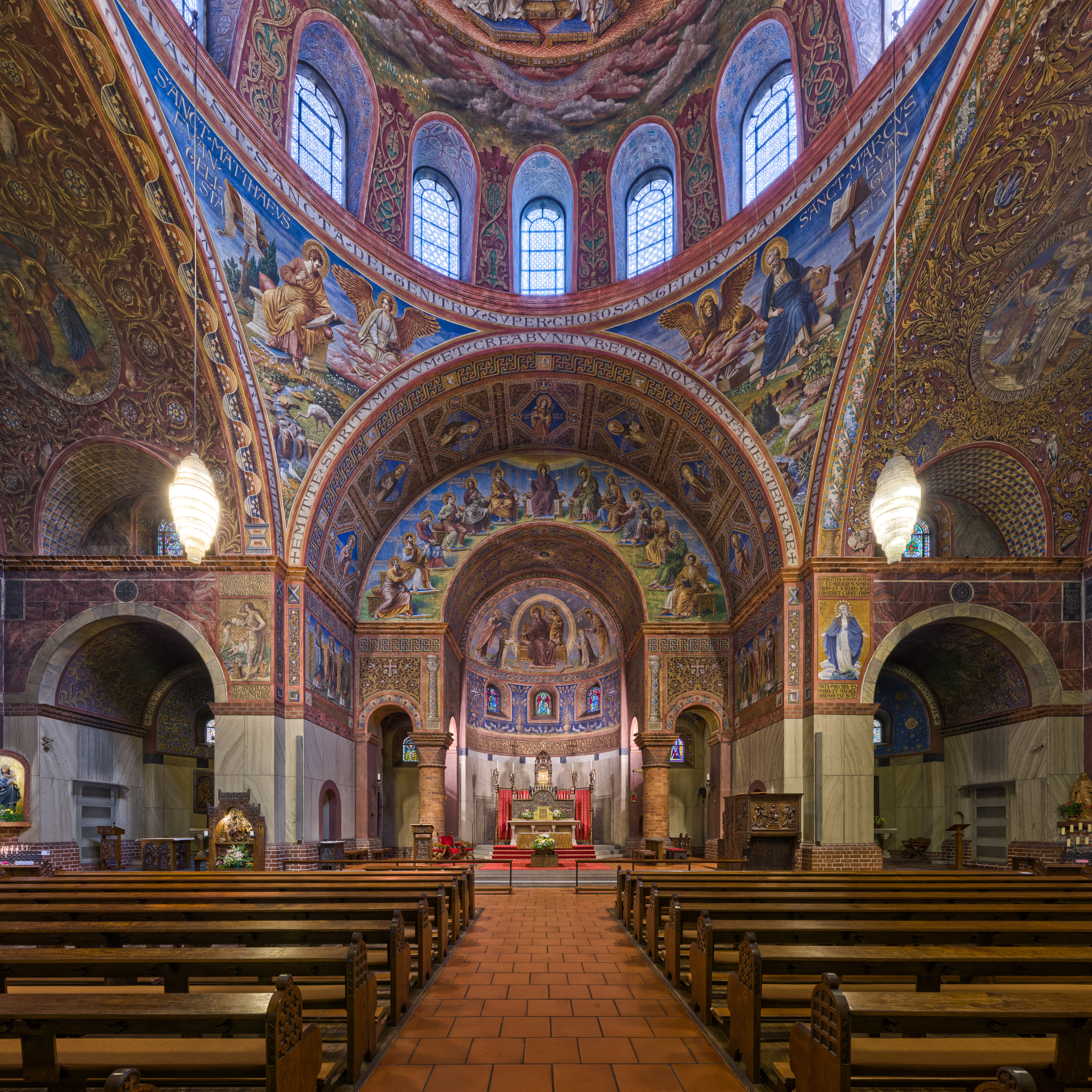
Murals inside the church

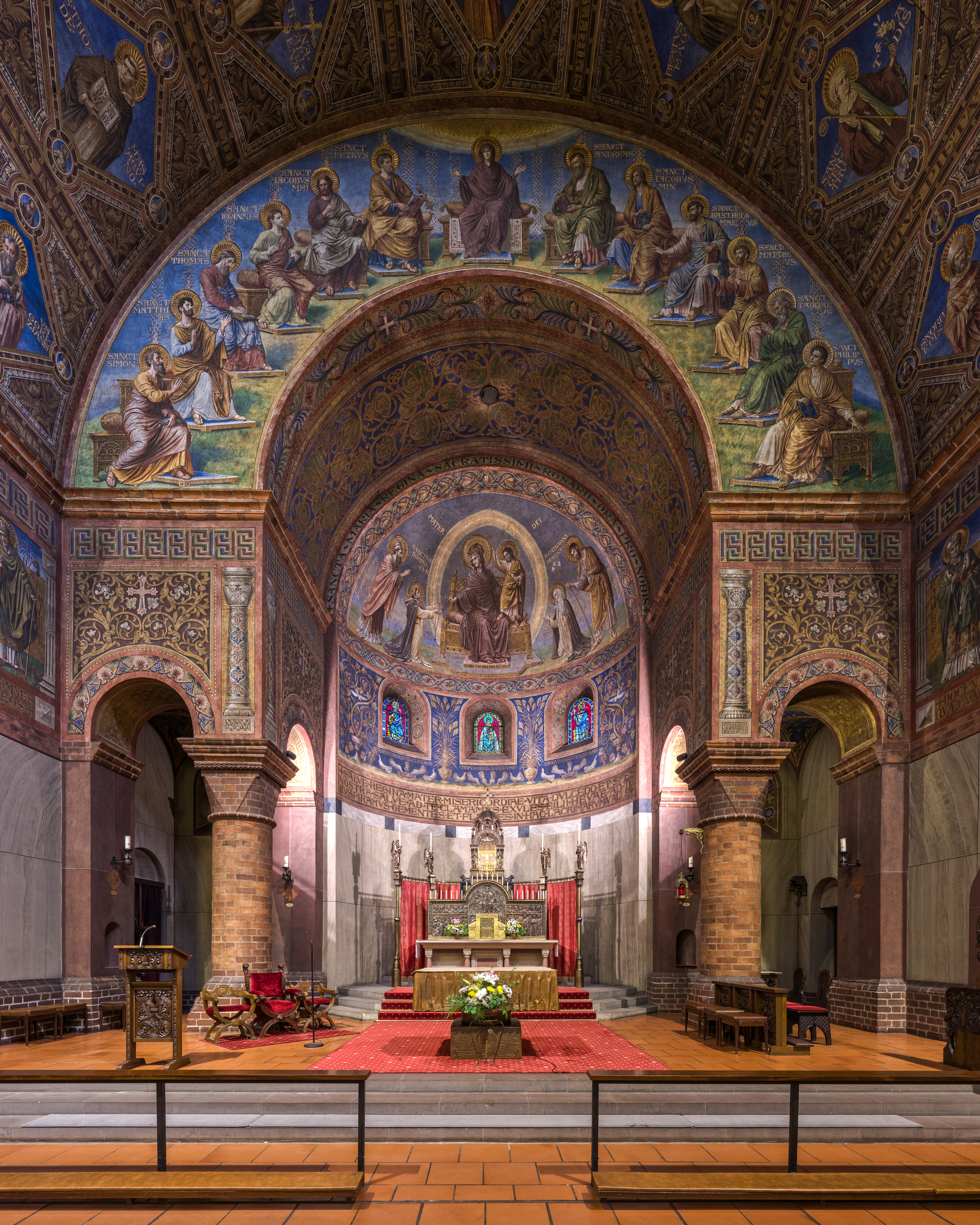
The altar surrounded by murals

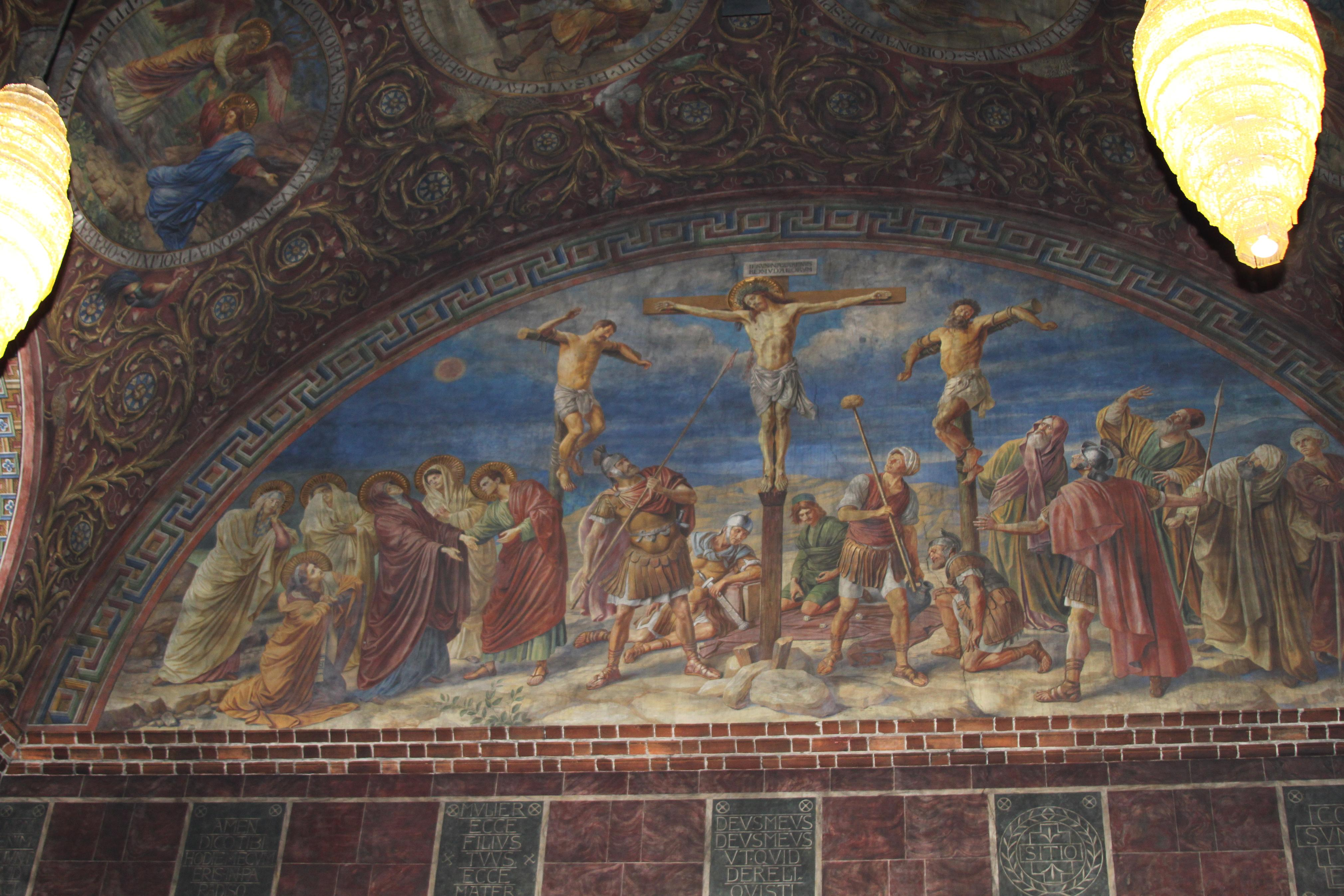
Mural of the Crucifixion of Jesus

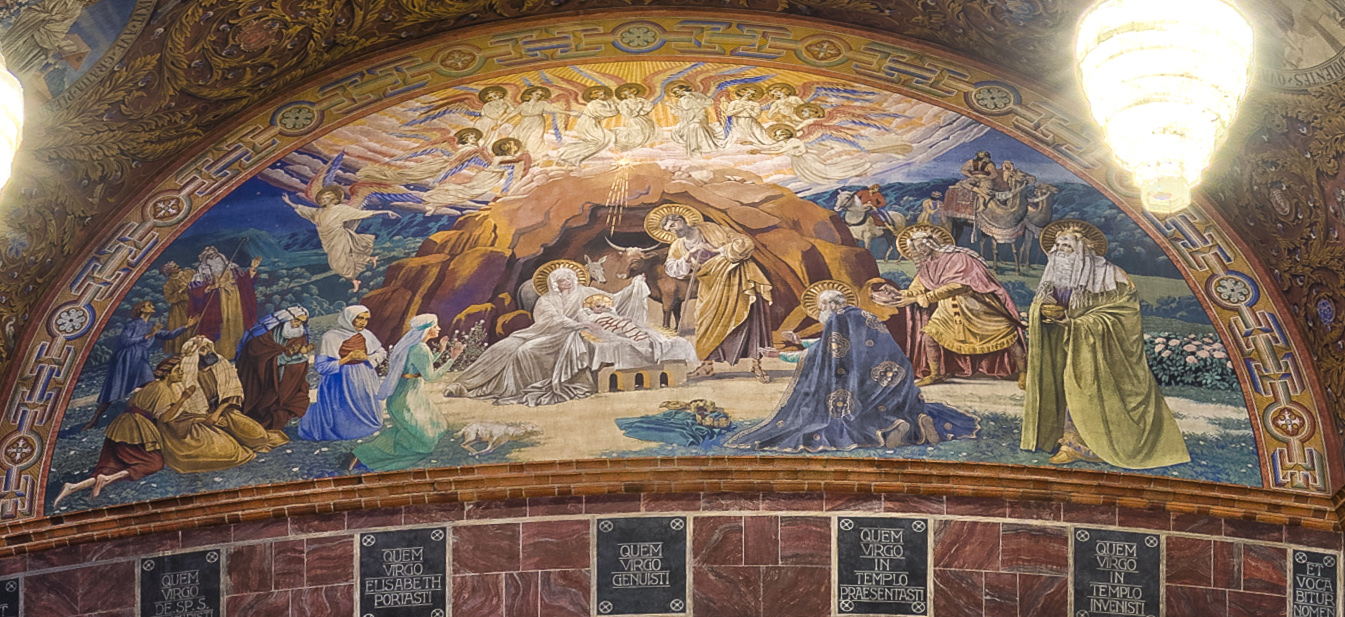
Mural of the Nativity of Jesus

== Bibliography ==
- Victor H. Elbern. "Rosenkranz-Basilika Berlin-Steglitz". Berlin, 1988
- Annelen Hölzner-Bautsch. "100 Jahre Kirche Mater Dolorosa – Geschichte der katholischen Gemeinde in Berlin-Lankwitz – 1912 bis 2012". Berlin: Katholische Pfarrgemeinde Mater Dolorosa, 2012
