= August Menken =

German architect

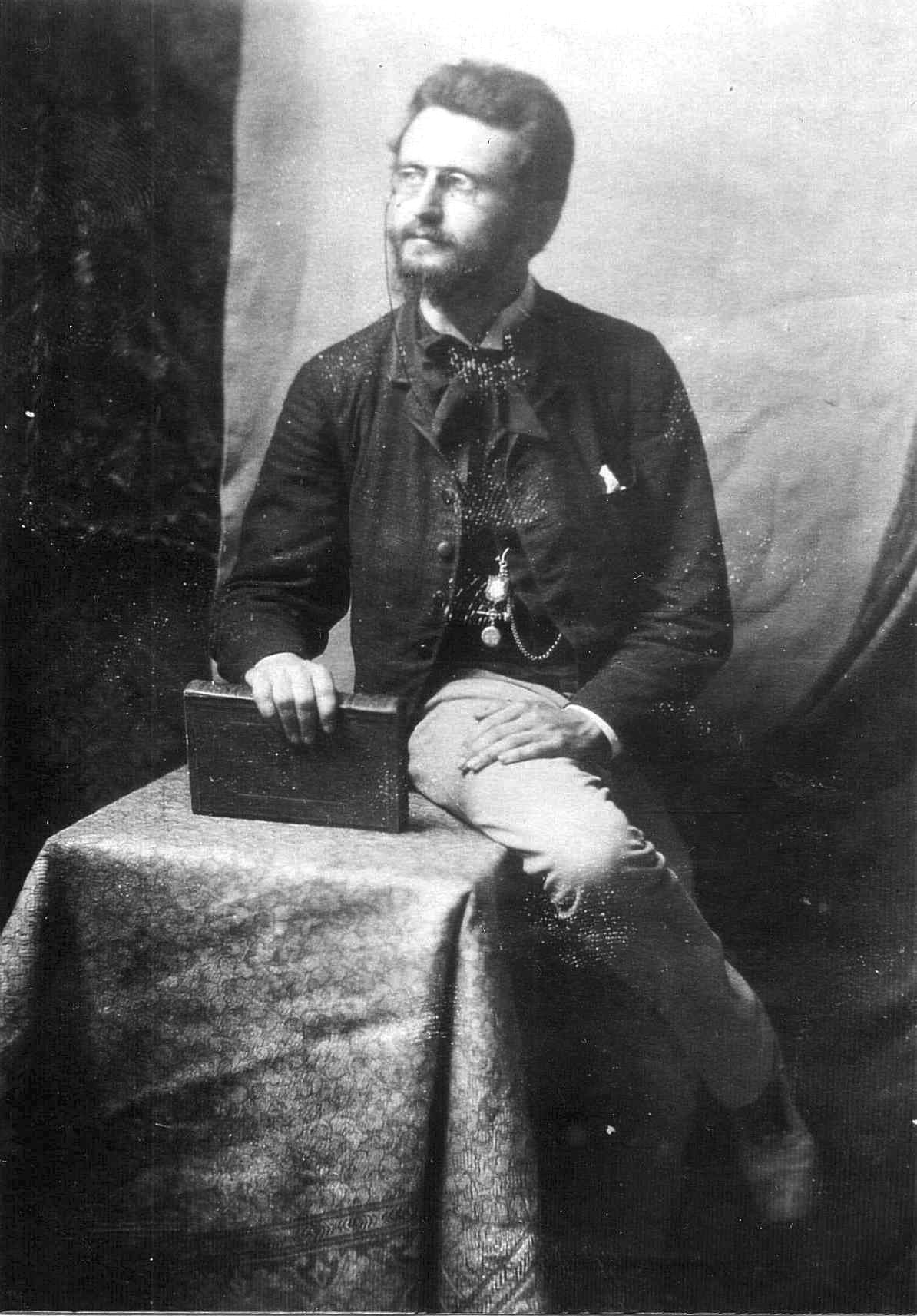
Menken in Rome, May 1886-May 1889

August Aloysius Johannes Menken (23 June 1858, Cologne - 18 September 1903, Berlin) was a German architect most notable for his historicist Roman Catholic churches.
