= Friedrich Geselschap =

German History Painter

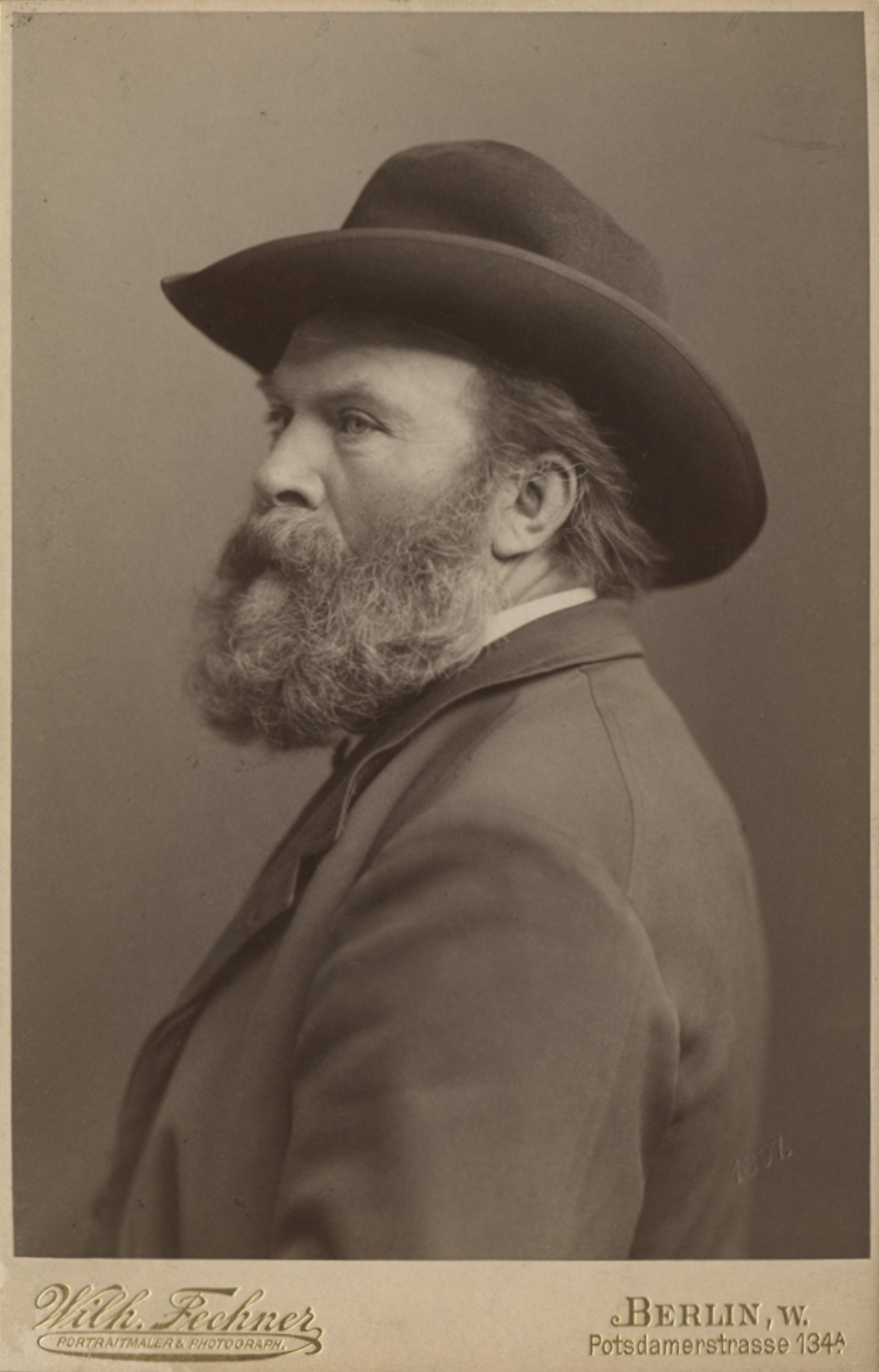
Friedrich Geselschap; by Wilhelm Fechner (1897)

Friedrich Geselschap (5 May 1835, Wesel - 31 May 1898, Rome) was a German history painter, in the Classical style.

== Life and work ==
He was the last child born to a family of merchants. Both of his parents died while he was still young, so he lived with his mother's relatives; attending the gymnasium in Breslau. There, he received his first drawing lessons from Ernst Resch, who advised him to seek a career in art. A scholarship enabled him to attend the Dresden Academy of Fine Arts, where he studied with Julius Schnorr von Carolsfeld. After being there for two years, he moved to Düsseldorf, to join his older brother, Eduard, who was also a painter. He began by taking private lessons from Theodor Mintrop, his brother's close friend. He eventually continued his studies at the Kunstakademie Düsseldorf, with Karl Ferdinand Sohn, Heinrich Mücke and Friedrich Wilhelm von Schadow, among others.

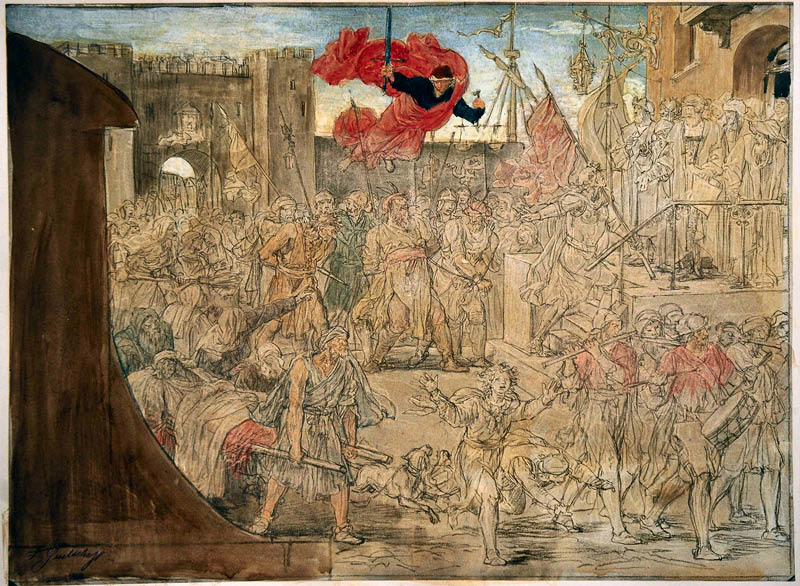
Bringing in the Pirate, Störtebeker

After completing his training, he experienced a period of economic hardship; earning his living from poorly paid portraits, many for officers of the local army garrison. His wish was to accumulate enough money for an extended trip to Italy. In 1866, thanks to mediation by the novelist, Wolfgang Müller von Königswinter, he received a generous gift from the businessman and art patron, August Lucius. Once in Rome, he became part of the circle associated with Friedrich Overbeck, and was influenced by the Nazarene movement. He also made friends with the painter and art historian, Heinrich Ludwig, who taught him the Classical fresco techniques.

Following the establishment of the German Empire in 1871, there was a great demand for monumental art. This was one of the things that prompted him to move to Berlin in 1872, but for several years he had to support himself by doing decorative paintings in the homes of the wealthy. Finally, a turning point came when he was given a commission, on behalf of the banker, Adolf von Hansemann, to do work at Dwasieden Castle on Rügen. His paintings caught the attention of Friedrich Hitzig, an architect who was a building official in Berlin. Soon, he provided Geselschap with his first commissions for public buildings. By 1877, he was confident enough to apply for work at the Imperial Palace of Goslar. His submissions came in second, but his career was assured.

In 1879, Hitzig won him a commission for what is now considered his magnum opus: decorations in the dome of the Zeughaus; an arsenal that was being converted to a Hall of Fame. Although it was his greatest success, it would also be his undoing. In 1880, he fell from a scaffold and sustained a knee injury that never healed properly. As a result it took him eleven years to complete the project.

He struggled with various health problems, associated with his accident until, by 1891, when the project was dedicated, his right leg was paralyzed. Unable to complete his own designs, he had to pass them on to other artists for execution. In 1897, he took a recreational trip to Rome, in hopes of regaining his strength, so that he could personally work on a project at the Church of Peace, Potsdam. Contrary to expectations, his suffering worsened, resulting in severe depression. In late May, 1898, he left his hotel room without telling anyone. On June 2, he was found hanging from a tree near the Porta del Popolo. He never married, and had no family, so he was interred in Rome, at the Protestant Cemetery. His grave is adorned with a sculpture by Rudolf Siemering. Due to the nature of his work, the majority of his paintings were destroyed in World War II.

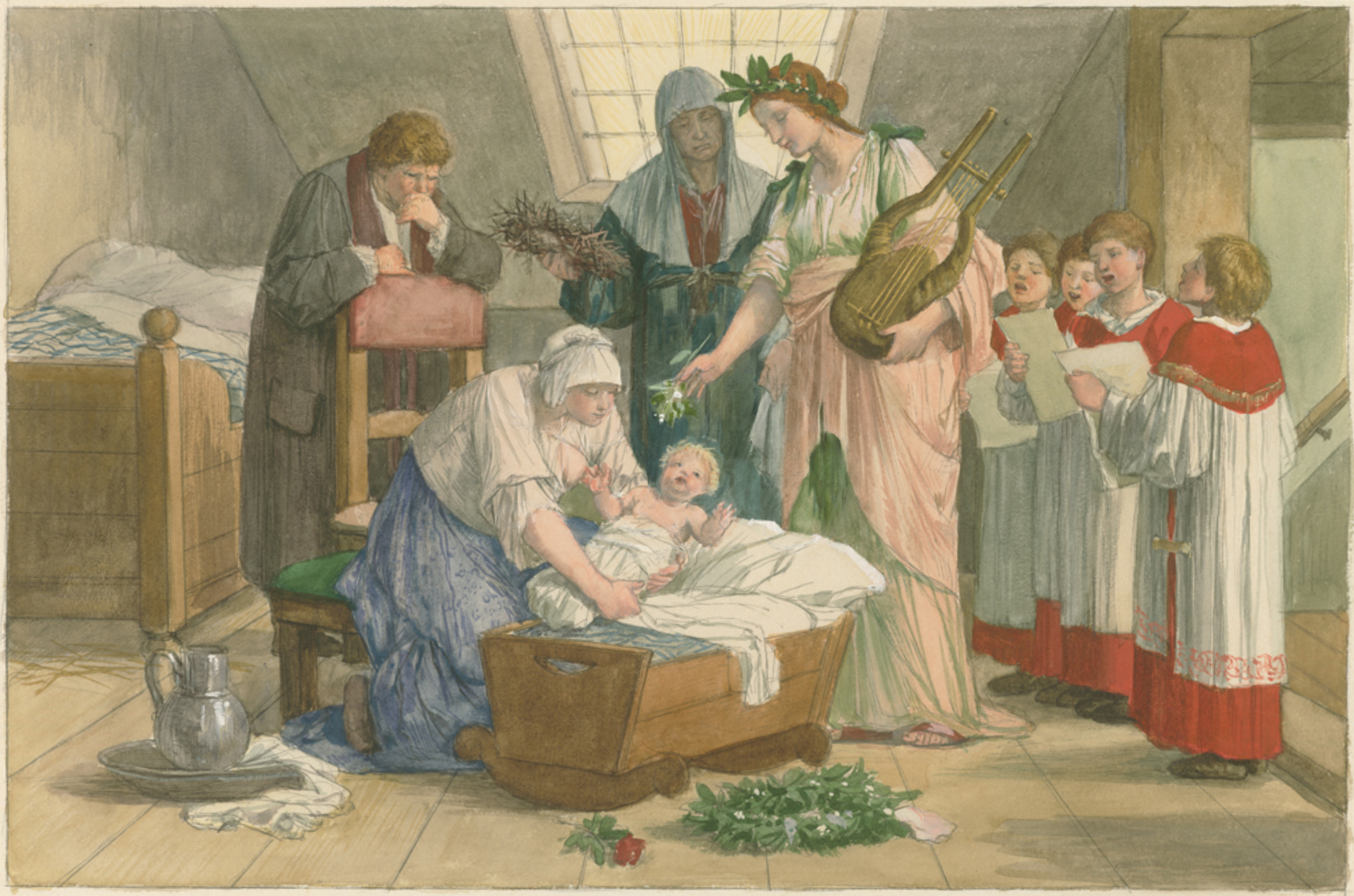
Beethoven's Birth (watercolor study)
