= St. Clement's Basilica, Hanover =

St Clement's Basilica
- German: Propsteikirche Basilika St. Clemens
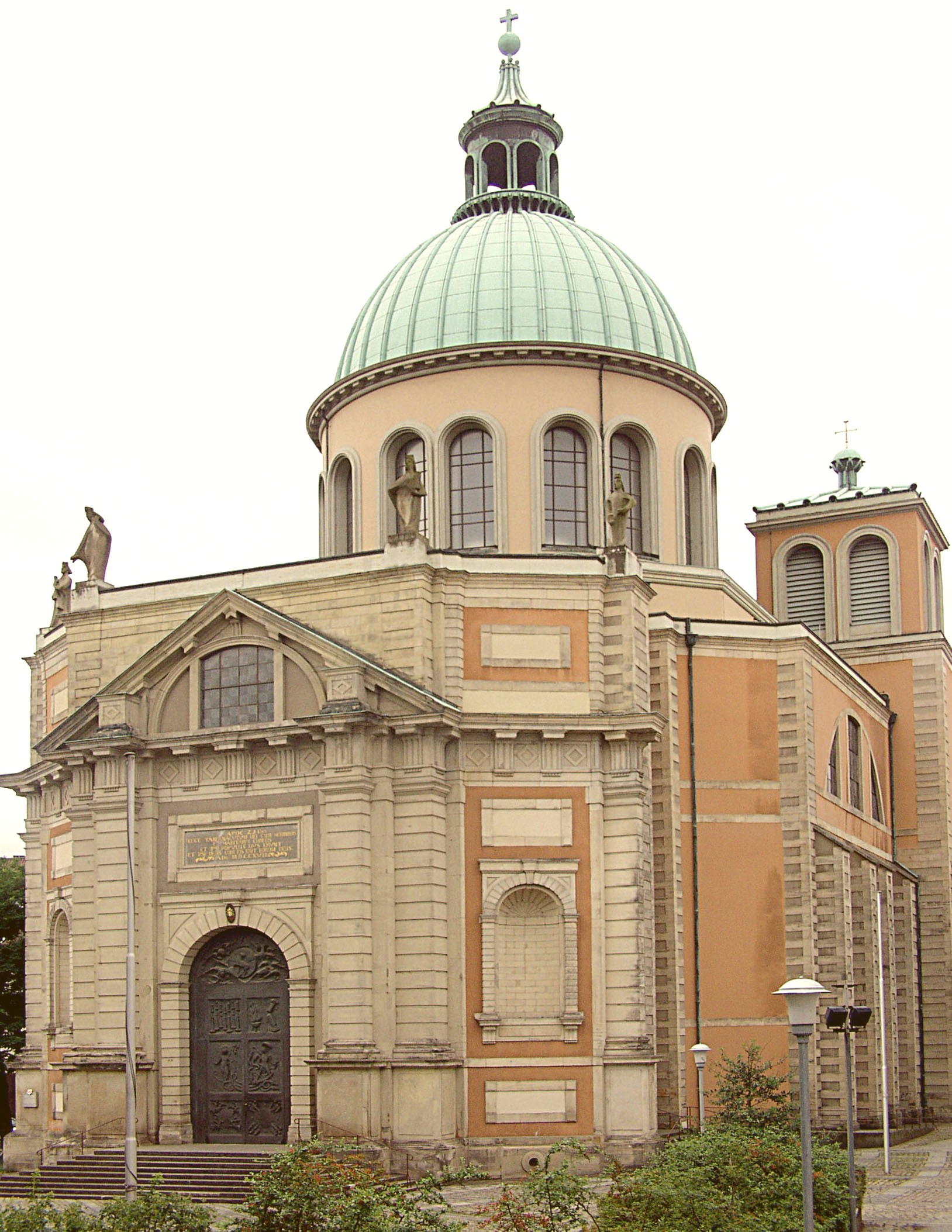

- Location within Lower Saxony
- 52°22′23″N 9°43′36″E
- Location: Goethestraße 33; Hanover, Lower Saxony
- Country: Germany
- Denomination: Roman Catholic
- Website: www.st-clemens-hannover.de

History
- Status: Basilica
- Consecrated: 4 November 1718

Architecture
- Functional status: Active
- Architect: Tommaso Giusti
- Groundbreaking: 6 July 1712

Administration
- Province: Hamburg
- Diocese: Hildesheim
- Parish: St. Heinrich

St. Clement's Basilica is the main Roman Catholic church in the city of Hanover. It is dedicated to Saint Clement of Rome. It is part of the parish of St. Heinrich and belongs to the Diocese of Hildesheim.

== History ==
Construction started in 1712, and finished in 1718. This was the first Roman Catholic church to be built in Hanover since the Reformation, when the Kingdom of Hanover became Protestant.

The church was almost totally destroyed during the Allied bombings in 1943 during World War II, as Hanover and other major cities were major targets for strategic bombing in an effort to cripple the Nazi regime. Reconstruction began in 1946, and the completed church was dedicated on 24 November 1957. On 12 March 1998, Pope John Paul II made the church a Minor Basilica.

== Notable burials ==
- Tommaso Giusti (de), Italian architect who designed St. Clement's
