= Georg Gottlob Ungewitter =

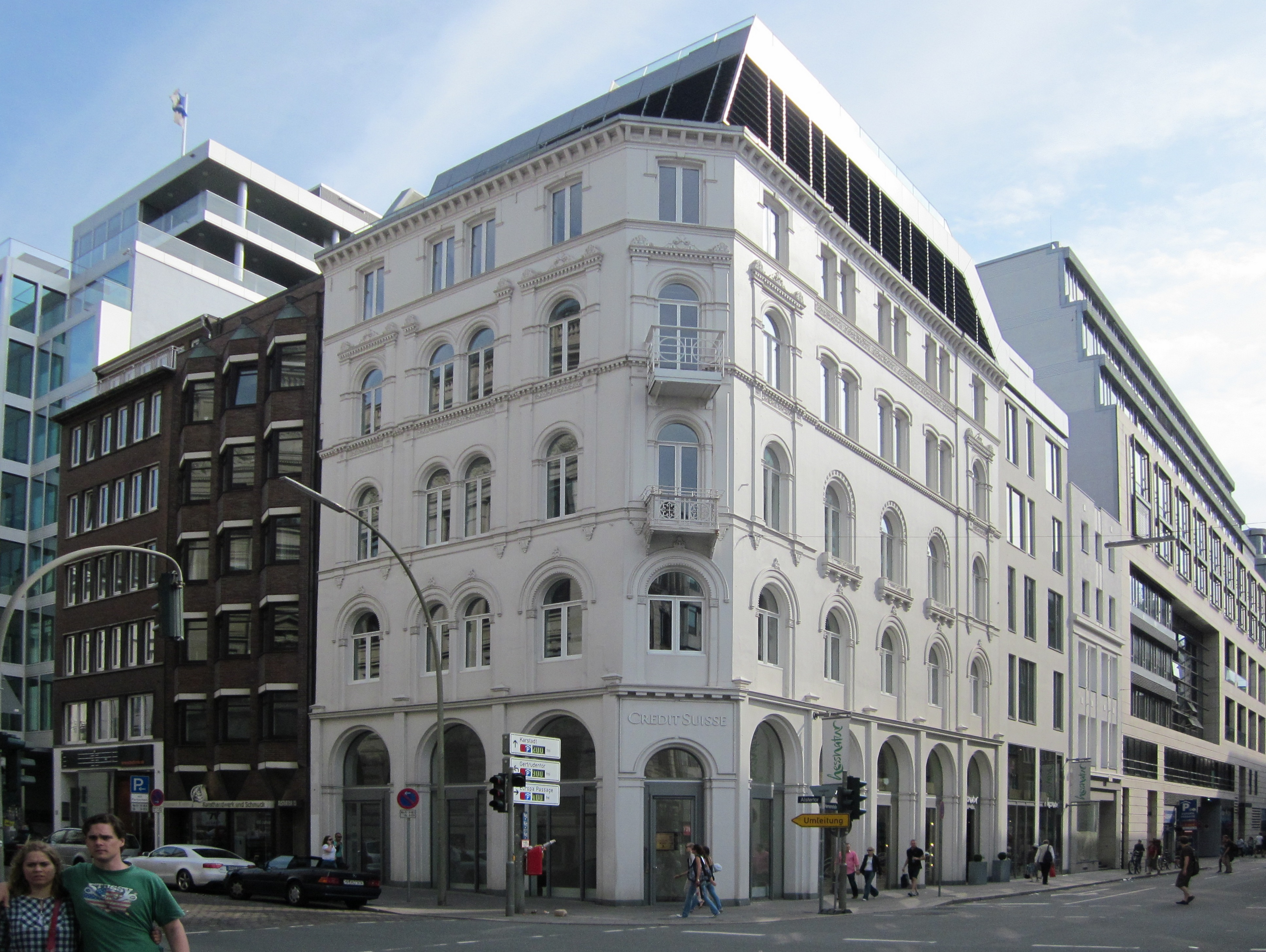
- Alstertor 17 was one of several commissions completed by Ungewitter as part of the rebuilding of central Hamburg following the Great Fire of 1842.
- Born: 15 September 1820; Wanfried, Hesse, German Confederation
- Died: 6 November 1864 (aged 44); Kassel, Hesse, German Confederation
- Occupation(s): Architect; Teacher; Writer
- Spouse: Albertine Elise Landré
- Parent(s): Johann Martin Justus Ungewitter (1785-1837); Maria Juliane Elisabeth Hohmann

Georg Gottlob Ungewitter (15 September 1820 – 6 November 1864) was a German architect and master builder.

Ungewitter was a pioneer in Germany of Gothic revival architecture. His work was particularly influential in respect of church architecture during the final decades of the nineteenth century and the early decades of the twentieth.

== Life ==
Georg Gottlob Ungewitter was born in Wanfried, a small town east of Kassel. His father, Johann Martin Justus Ungewitter (1785-1837) was in business and the boy was initially destined for a business career, but his interest in buildings and construction manifested itself early on, and he commenced training to become an architect when aged 14: he attended the Building Academy there, and then relocated to Munich in 1837. He returned to Kassel in 1840 and embarked upon a traineeship, but left at his own request two years later to pursue his studies, briefly, in Berlin. During the middle 1840s he worked for six years in Hamburg where the Great Fire of 1842 had left plenty of work for architects, before moving to Lübeck. It was during his two years in this Hanseatic City, in 1848 and 1849, that he became attached to the then burgeoning interest in reviving architecture of the late Gothic period. He was influenced both by the Medieval architecture of old Lübeck and by the work of August Reichensperger, a politician whose own longstanding interest in architecture had already manifested itself with a book on church architecture and in his influential membership of the commission created to oversee the completion/rebuilding of Cologne Cathedral. Around 1850 Ungewitter set himself up as a freelance architect in Leipzig: here he found few commissions, and he devoted much of his time to honing his draftsmanship skills, sketching the city's old buildings.

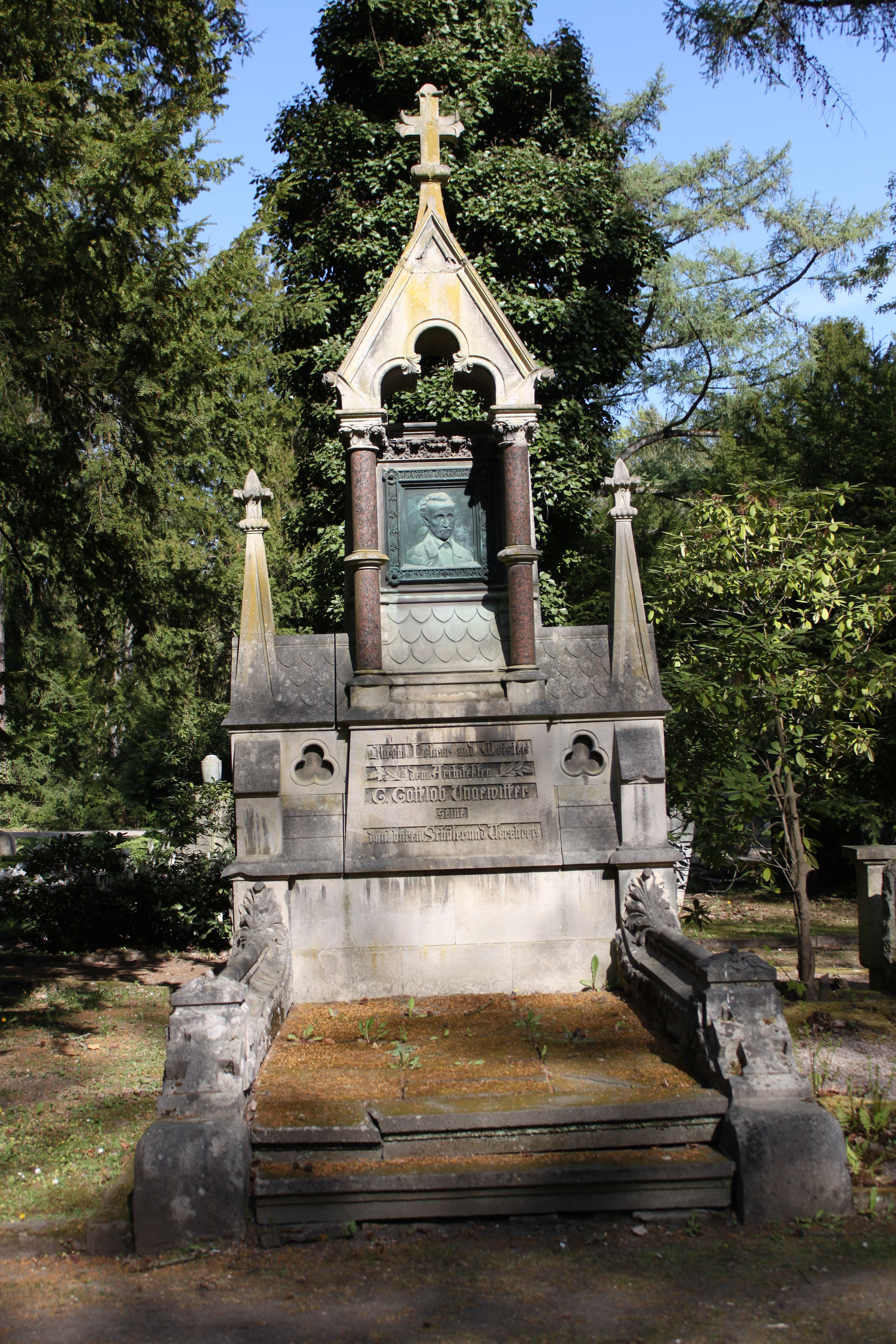
Grave of Georg Gottlob Ungewitter

He then returned to Kassel where he was employed between 1852 and 1864 at the Business Academy (a forerunner of the city's current university). 1852 was also the year in which he married Albertine Elise Landré. At Kassel one of his pupils (who later became a colleague) was Wilhelm Lotz. Ungewitter's teaching, architectural designs and publications helped to develop high standards of craftsmanship and precision in the new wave of architects. His finely detailed Gothic columns, windows and balcony canopies would become mainstream only a generation later. The English origins of Germany's new tide of Gothic revival architecture are also apparent with Ungewitter, as in the work of many of his contemporaries.

Relatively few of Ungewitter's designs were actually built. That stands in contrast with the experience of Conrad Wilhelm Hase whose career in many other respects closely mirrored Ungewitter's own. After he married and settled in back Kassel, Ungewitter's first career priority lay in the area of teaching. However, the increasing originality and complexity of his designs also played a part. His designs for standalone buildings are exceptionally disparate, with numerous annexes and bays, necessitating exceptionally complicated roof shapes, so that taken together the features of a single design can be barely compatible.
