= Eduard Daelen =

German painter and writer

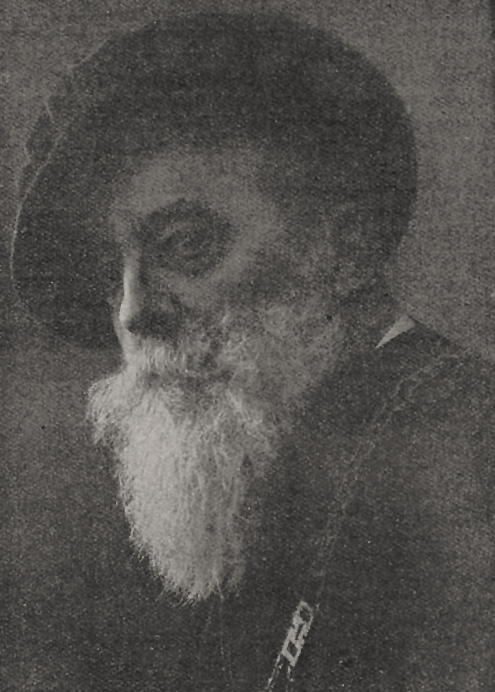
Der Verfasser des Festspiels "Hollands Blütezeit" Maler Eduard Daelen als Rembrandt (1912)

Eduard Adolf Daelen (18 March 1848 – 9 May 1923) was a German painter and writer. For some of his writings he used the pseudonyms Ursus teutonicus, Angelo Dämon, Edu Daelen-Bachem and Michel Bär. He became known above all for the first biography of Wilhelm Busch, which he wrote in 1886.

== Life ==
Born in Hörde, Daelen was the son of a senior engineer. Although he much preferred to study art, he was first forced to study mechanical engineering. To this end, he was enrolled at the trade school in Barmen from 1863 to 1865 and at the trade academy in Berlin from 1867 to 1868. It was not until the autumn of 1868 that he entered the elementary class with Andreas Müller at the Kunstakademie Düsseldorf, but left again in the autumn of 1869 "because he could not yet get a place in the antique hall". He therefore went first to the Berlin and until 1875 to the Munich Academy of Arts, where Otto Seitz and Wilhelm von Diez were his teachers. After a short stay in Rome, he settled in Düsseldorf in 1875. From 1877 to 1923, he was a member of the Malkasten and chairman of the local association of the Allgemeine Deutsche Kunstgenossenschaft. He also belonged to the academic artists' association Orient, the artists' group Laetitia and the Düsseldorfer Schriftstellerverein. In 1900, he was the initiator of the Goethe-Bund. In Erkrath-Hochdahl near Düsseldorf, the Eduard-Daelen-Straße was named after him.

== Activity ==
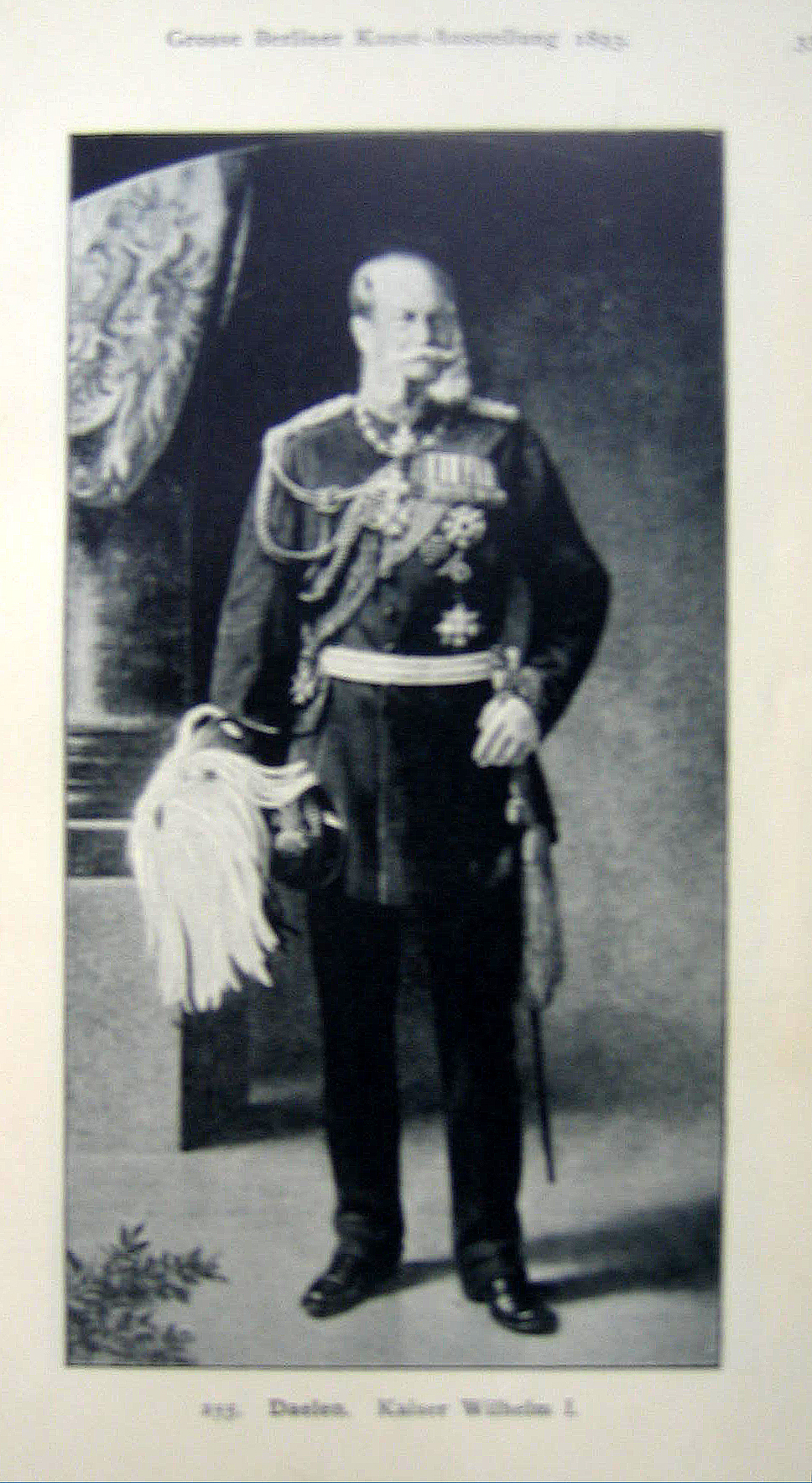
Bildnis Kaiser Wilhelm I. – Große Berliner Kunstausstellung 1893 (Katalog-Abbildung)

Daelen's painting is assigned to the Düsseldorf school of painting and Munich School. He dealt with activities of the Düsseldorf school in numerous paintings and writings. His painting style can be described as "realistic", However, he also incorporated Impressionist influences in his colouring and application of paint. He probably had financial success mainly with portraits, e.g. of the German Emperor Wilhelm I or Otto von Bismarck's for local and public clients. In addition, he also produced "surreal" compositions, such as Größenwahn (1891), Aschermittwoch (1892), or Der Clown, an allegory of "contemporary artistic excesses" (1892), as well as landscape depictions and numerous other portraits. After the outbreak of the First World War, he produced "patriotic" works such as the paintings Der deutsche Adler. Kampf des germanischen Adlers mit dem gallischen Hahn, Des Weltbrands Licht!, Allegorie auf den Weltkrieg or Mit eiserner Ruhe. The "German Michel" leaning on a sword, the blade of which is inscribed with "Siegfried", stands upright before a dragon. In addition, he became involved with appeals, posters and war postcards.

Among other things, Daelen wrote art criticism, which appeared under the pseudonyms Ursos teutonicus and Angelo Dämon in various papers. In them he occasionally used language that bordered on insults. In addition, he published titles such as Das Hohe Lied vom Bier, Schüttle dich, Germania! , Skizzen vom Rhein, Triumph der Hansa, biographies (among others on Eduard Bendemann, Wilhelm Camphausen, Carl Müller, Eduard Steinbrück and Benjamin Vautier) for thee Allgemeine Deutsche Biographie, poems as well as festive and slow plays for performance in the Künstlerverein Malkasten. He was editor and co-author of the art volumes Die Schönheit der Frauen, 280 photographic outdoor studies by Ed Büchler, J. Agélou, G. Plüschow and E. Schneider (with Paul Hirth), Stuttgart, Schmidt 1905, Die Schönheit des menschlichen Körpers, with 322 painterly nude studies after nature (with contributions by Gustav Fritsch, Josef Kirchner among others), Stuttgart, Kunstverlag Klemm & Beckmann 1905, and Nackte Schönheit. Ein Buch für Künstler und Ärzte, with 336 artistic nude studies after photographic images (with the collaboration of Dr. Gustav Fritsch, Professor of Anatomy at the University of Berlin and J. Paar), Stuttgart, Hermann Schmidt 1907.

== Eduard Daelen and Wilhelm Busch ==
A vehement anti-Catholic, he believed he had found a kindred spirit in Wilhelm Busch. This seemed to be indicated by Wilhelm Busch's anti-clerical picture stories such as Die fromme Helene, Der heilige Antonius von Padua and Pater Filucius. When Daelen's work Über Wilhelm Busch und seine Bedeutung appeared, however, both Wilhelm Busch and his circle of friends were embarrassed. In the scurrilous laudation, Eduard Daelen equated Wilhelm Busch with greats such as Leonardo da Vinci, Peter Paul Rubens and Gottfried Wilhelm Leibniz and quoted uncritically from a noncommittal correspondence with Busch. He described the author Busch as the "archetype of the genuine German folk spirit" and "embodiment of the mythical ancestor Teut". The pious Helene, which in today's view caricatures above all religious hypocrisy and dubious bourgeois morality, Daelen saw as an attack on "female mischievousness, curiosity and vanity, as well as the always speculative sophistication despite all laziness and narrow-mindedness".

The literary scholar Friedrich Theodor Vischer, who in his essay Über neuere deutsche Karikatur (On Recent German Caricature) found a respectful appreciation of Busch as well as some critical remarks, attacked Daelen in page-long tirades as a "literary bonze" and accused him of the "eunuch envy of the dried-up philistine". One of the first to respond to Daelen's biographical attempt was the literary historian Johannes Proelß. His essay, which appeared in the Frankfurter Zeitung, contained a number of incorrect biographical data and was the occasion for Wilhelm Busch to comment on his person in the same newspaper. Busch felt exposed by the biography and felt that the denigration by Kaspar Braun went too far. He also found the treatment of his relationship with Johanna Keßler, who had strongly supported him in his Frankfurt years, indiscreet and tastelessly illuminated.

Daelen died in Düsseldorf at the age of 75.

== Work ==
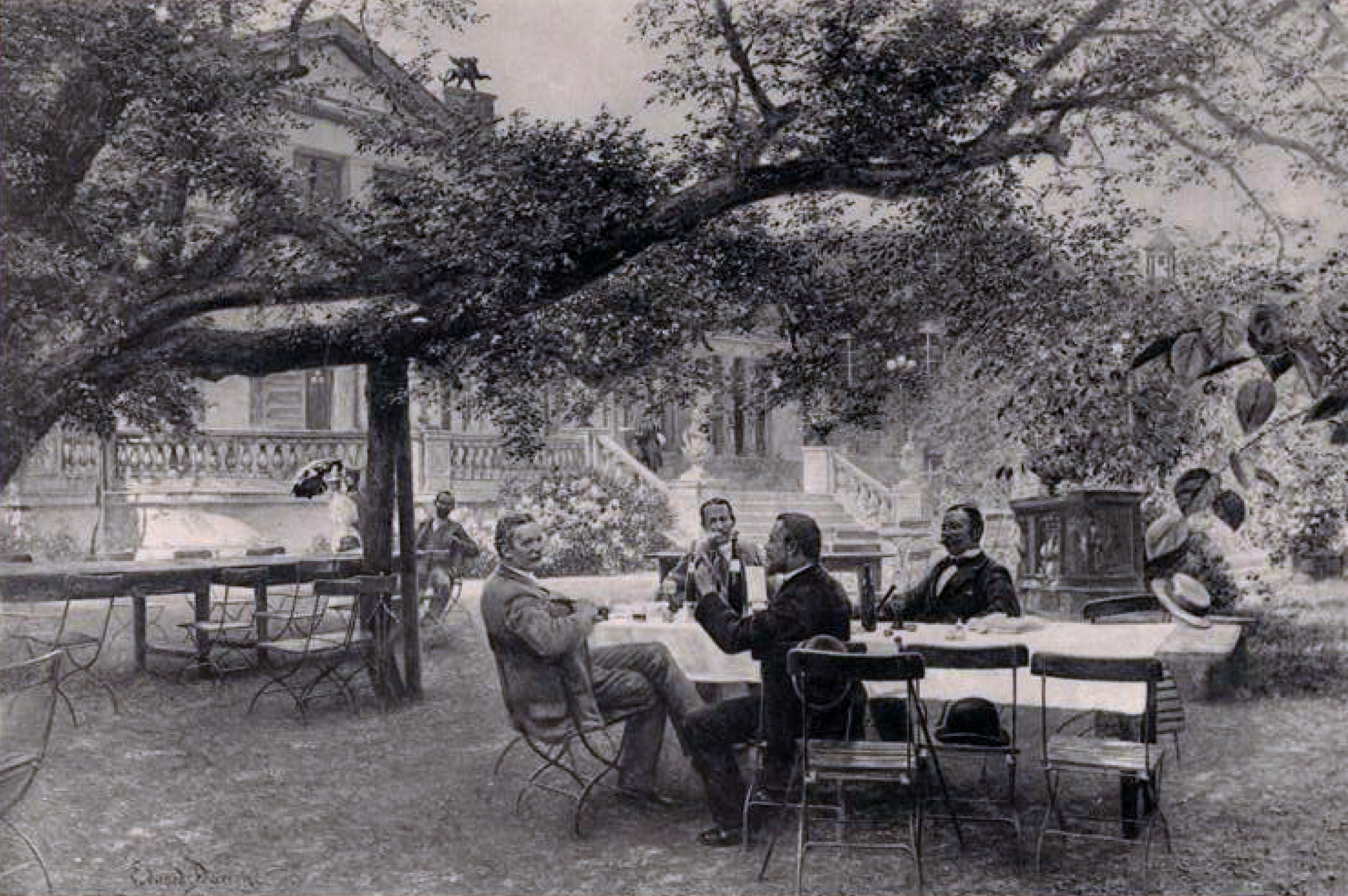
Gemütliche Runde im Park des alten Düsseldorfer Malkasten (Mittag im Malkasten-Park), 1896 (Schwarz-Weiß-Abbildung)

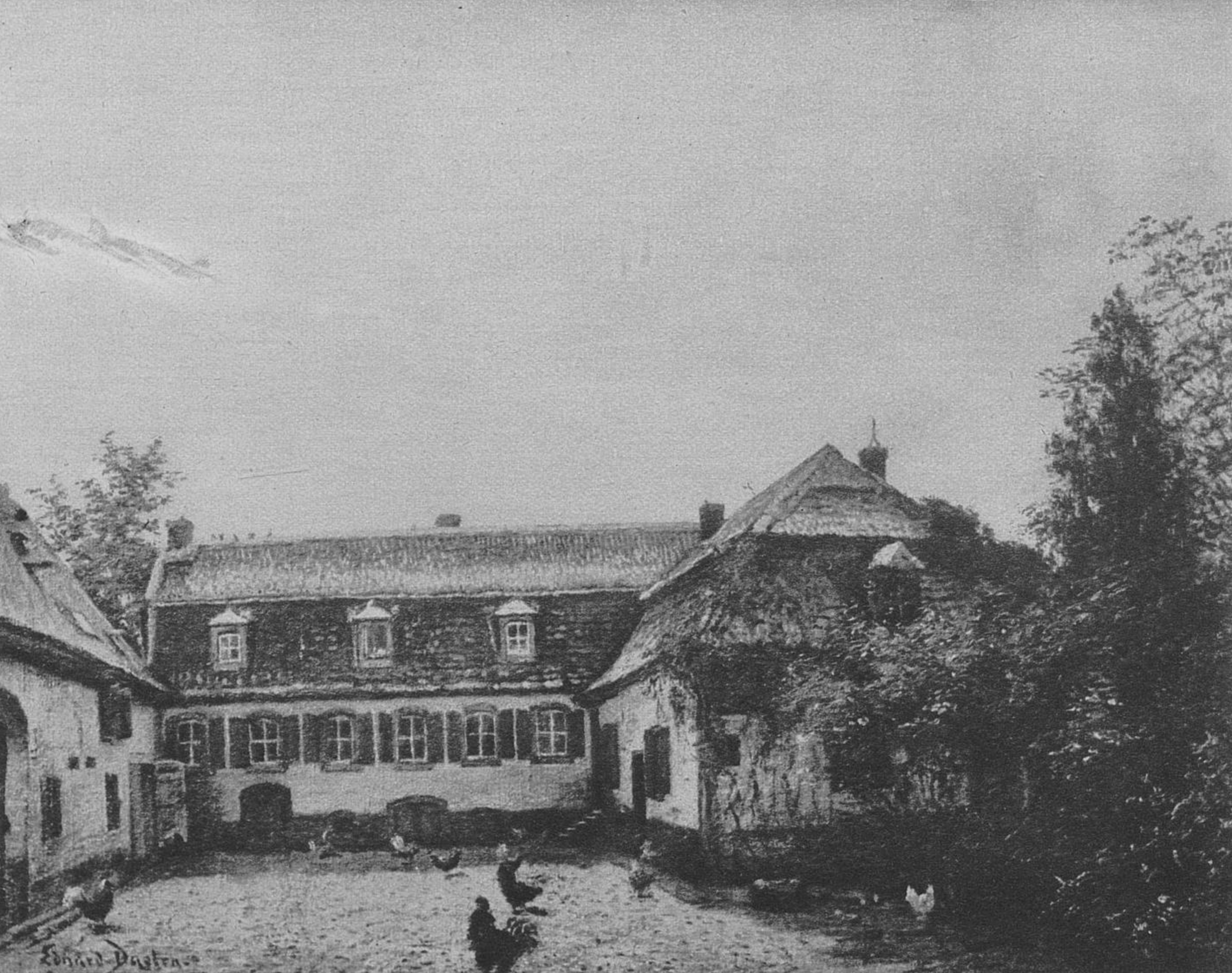
Kürtenhof in Düsseldorf-Flingern, by Eduard Daelen (1914)

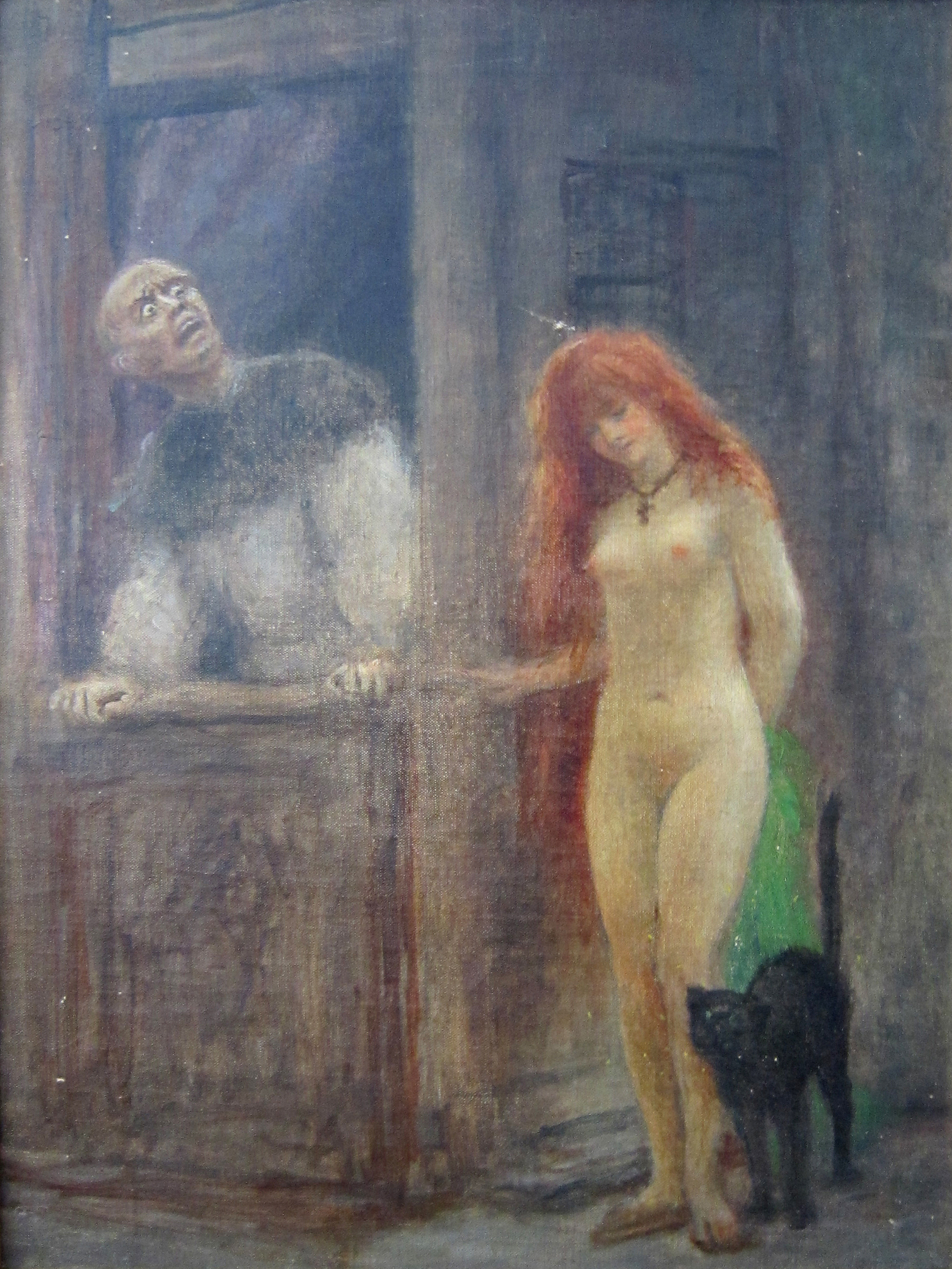
Offenes Geheimnis am Beichtstuhl, Gemälde aus dem Nachlass

- Motiv aus Tivoli, 1875
- Abendstimmung am Hintersee, 1877
- Selbstbildnis, 1880, in Stadtmuseum Landeshauptstadt Düsseldorf.
- Huldigung an Kaiser Wilhelm I., 1880; former Rathaus Oberhausen
- Mars imperator – Venus imperatrix, 1888
- Größenwahn, 1891
- Aschermittwoch, 1892
- Der Clown, Allegorie auf „zeitgenössische Kunstauswüchse“, 1892
- Bildnis eines bärtigen Herrn (Karl Heinrich Wedigen), 1895
- Gemütliche Runde im Park des alten Düsseldorfer Malkasten, 1896
- Bildnis des Stadtrats Peter Hubert Knops, 1908; former Museum Siegen
- Im Düsseltal, 1914
- Offenes Geheimnis am Beichtstuhl, legacy

== Publications ==
- Der Fall „Jägerhof-Park“. Ein Alarmruf in höchster Not. Düsseldorf o.J. Manuscript: Malkasten-Archiv, Düsseldorf.
- Narrfingen. Die wundervollste Wundergeschichte unseres Jahrhunderts. Von Michel Bär (d. i. Eduard Daelen). Düsseldorf 1879.
- Der Blick ins Jenseits. With Carl Maria Seyppel. 1880.
- Der Reinfall. Lustige Schweizerreise. 1881.
- Schüttle Dich, Germania. Düsseldorf 1881.
- Keine Spielverderber oder: Man immer gemüthlich! Allegorisches Bühnenweihfestspiel zur Eröffnung der Winter-Zwillingskegelbahn im Malkasten zu Düsseldorf am 11.11.1882. Düsseldorf 1882.
- Auf die Jungfrau! Eine lust’ge Schweizerreise, welche vier fidele Knaben abenteuerlicherweise unlängst unternommen haben. 1882.
- Bismarck. Eine Vision. Mit 90 Illustrationen. Oberhausen und Leipzig 1882.
- Von der Wurschtigkeit. Bismarckiaden in Reim und Bild. Oberhausen und Leipzig 1883.
- Das Hohe Lied vom Bier. Phantasie. Düsseldorf 1884.
- Die Gründung Pempelforts oder Skandal und Liebe. Humoristisches Lustspiel von Ursus Teutonicus. Düsseldorf 1884.
- Knall und Fall. Festspiel. 1885.
- Die elf Gebote der Ehe. Eine Humoreske. 1885.
- Festspiel zur Feier des 70. Geburtstages und des 50jährigen Malerjubiläums von Andreas Achenbach im Malkasten, 28.9.1885. Düsseldorf 1885.
- Ueber Wilhelm Busch und seine Bedeutung. Eine lustige Streitschrift. Düsseldorf. Bagel 1886.
- Der muntere Wähler, oder Laß dich nicht verblüffen!. Ca. 1887.
- Zur Geschichte der bildenden Kunst in Düsseldorf. In Beiträge zur Geschichte des Niederrheins. Vol. 3, Düsseldorf 1888, pp. 296 ff. (Numerized)
- Schüttle Dich, Germania! Geharnischte Bismarcksonette von einem Freimüthigen. Düsseldorf 1891.
- Skizzen vom Rhein. Aus der Studienmappe von E. Daelen. Spaarmann, Styrum und Leipzig 1894.
- Brutus, schläfst Du? Ein Mahnruf an die Kunststadt Düsseldorf. Düsseldorf 1896.
- Mars und Venus oder ihr neuester Sieg. Jubiläums-Vorspiel-Polterabendscherz-Bummelstück in einem Akt. Künstlerverein Malkasten; 50. Stiftungsfest. Düsseldorf 1898.
- Eine Doppelhochzeit. Festspiel zum 50jährigen Jubiläum des Malkastens am 3.7.1898. Düsseldorf 1898.
- Aus der Geschichte des Malkasten artist association : zur Jubelfeier seines fünfzigjährigen Bestehens; 1848 – 1898. - Düsseldorf : Bagel, 1898. Digitalisierte Ausgabe der Universitäts- und Landesbibliothek Düsseldorf.
- Das Friedensfest in Pempelfort. Satyrspiel zur Feier der Jahrhundertwende. Düsseldorf ca. 1900.
- Maskenredoute des Künstlervereins Malkasten. Düsseldorf, 24 February 1900: „Triumph der Hansa“. Düsseldorf 1900.
- Aufruf an die Düsseldorfer Künstlerschaft zur Bildung eines Goethe-Bundes. Vorgetragen in der Generalversammlung der Düsseldorfer Künstler am 23.4.1900. Düsseldorf 1900.
- Das neue Kunstausstellungsgebäude zu Düsseldorf. Düsseldorf 1901/02.
- Ein Friedensplan. Entwurf zu einem Festspiel zur Großen Industrie- und Kunstausstellung. Düsseldorf 1902.
- Frechheit ist Trumpf! oder Wer lacht da? Ein Satyrspiel zur Internationalen Kunstausstellung von Angelo Dämon. Düsseldorf 1904.
- Malkastenhumor. Das Geheimnis oder Salon und Galgen. Düsseldorf, after 1905.
- Bilanz der Internationalen. Mit einer zeitgemäßen Forderung von Angelo Dämon. Stuttgart 1905.
- La moralité du nu. Klemm & Beckmann, Berlin 1906
- Hollands Blütezeit. Festspiel, Malkastenredoute, Düsseldorf, 17.2.1912. Düsseldorf 1912.
- Zum Monistentag in Düsseldorf, 6.9.1913. Drei Gedichte. 1913.
- Laetitia, viellieber Klang!. In Velhagen & Klasings Monatshefte 28.3 (Mai/Aug. 1914).
- Gedicht zum Tode des Malers Ernst Bosch am 22. März 1917. In Düsseldorfer Generalanzeiger, 26 March 1917.
- Welt-Großmacht Presse, zur Großen Berliner Kunstausstellung 1917. Düsseldorf 1918.
- Vom Fischerdorf zur Weltstadt. Eine Offenbarung der Weltstadt. Düsseldorf 1918.
- Das Vorrecht der Jugend. Ein heiteres Spiel. Düsseldorf 1919.
- Die nackte Maja. Das Lustspiel der Revolution in 3 Akten. Düsseldorf 1920.
- Deutscher Frühling. Freie Bekenntnisse von Edu Daelen-Bachem und Emma Lucas-Boeddinghaus. Düsseldorf 1920.
- Das Kreuz. Roman aus Düsseldorfs Vergangenheit. Manuscript, o.J.; Düsseldorf, Malkasten-Archiv.
