= Carl Maria Seyppel =

German painter (1847–1913)

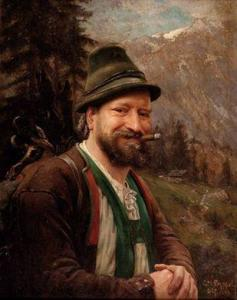
Jäger

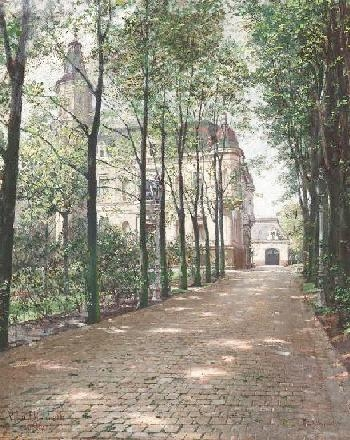
Villa Elisabeth

Carl Maria Seyppel, also Karl Maria Seyppel, (28 July 1847 – 20 November 1913) was a German genre and portrait painter, caricaturist, and writer, based in Düsseldorf.

== Life ==
Seyppel was born in Düsseldorf, the son of Friedrich Wilhelm Seyppel, an official of the Düsseldorf Städtische Leihanstalt, and his wife Josefina Dorothea, née Tasse, He entered the Kunstakademie Düsseldorf already at the age of 14, through the mediation of Hermann Wislicenus. His teachers there were Andreas Müller in basics and art history, Carl Müller in the hall of antiquities (Antikensaal) and Rudolf Wiegmann in the building class. In November 1866, he moved to the compositional class headed by Karl Ferdinand Sohn. The painting Junger Italiener (Young Italian), created in 1867 in the master class, is considered his first independent work. Also while still a student, he created Der glückliche Fund (The lucky find) 1868. After Sohn's death, Seyppel continued his studies with Julius Roeting and Eduard Bendemann. His exposure to Dutch Golden Age painting provided him with a thorough technique as well as a fine sense of tone. In 1870, he worked for a short time in the studio of Ludwig Knaus. After an assignment during the Franco-Prussian War of 1870/71 as a nurse in hospitals near Trier and Metz, he undertook study trips to Rhine and Moselle, to Westphalia and Upper Bavaria, to the Black Forest and to England and the Netherlands. In 1898, he travelled with Heinrich Petersen-Angeln and Gustav Adolf Schweitzer to Paris.

Seyppel's works were regularly exhibited at home and abroad. The Kulturhistorisches Museum Magdeburg purchased the painting In zwei Zügen matt in 1887, which he then repeated in 1889. Der Leierkastenmann (1880) was acquired by the Niedersächsisches Landesmuseum Hannover; Der Rosenkranzverkäuer (The rosary seller) was acquired by the Kunstmuseum Bonn.

Seyppel was active in Düsseldorf throughout his life. He was a member of the association Malkasten (KVM) from 1873 to 1913, serving as its president from 1998. He was also a member of the academic artists association Orient, and involved on the board of the Düsseldorf Historical Society. Seyppel painted landscapes including Straße an der Mosel (1870), Mühle am Niederrhein (1872), Windmühle bei Zons (1870), and also portraits, especially those of fellow Düsseldorf painters, but he preferred humorous scenes from folk life. For a restaurant he created the mural Die Wolfsschlucht. His "Ancient Egyptian" humoresques printed on "mummy paper" - a predecessor of comics- which were produced from 1882 onwards, became well known. During this period, he was in correspondence with the Egyptologist and writer Georg Ebers. He was further involved with texts and/or illustrations in the children's book Vom Storchennest bis zur Schule (1881), Kneipepistel § 11 (1881), Mein Buch (1884), Carmen Silva (commemorative sheets of the Queen of Romania), and Deutsche Märchen für Jugend und Volk (1887). For the KVM, he drew the portraits of his fellow painters, designed theatre posters for several Bummelstücke - in which he also acted himself - and wrote humorous poems.

In 1893, Seyppel exhibited six Parodies of a recent Norwegian exhibition in the Düsseldorf art shop of Eduard Schulte, in response to works exhibited by Edvard Munch in Düsseldorf after their exhibition in Berlin was cancelled in 1892.

Seyppel was married to Helene, née Brunstering. They had five children. He was portrayed for the KVM Artists' Gallery by his son Hans Seyppel.

== Work ==
- Düsseldorf, Kunstmuseum: Schwarzwälder Bauernstube. Interieur, oil painting (1900/03); Oberstraße in Enkrich
- Düsseldorf, Künstlerverein Malkasten, Archiv: Bildnis Köbes Schieve oil painting; Das Ständchen, Plakat (1875); 4 pencil drawings and a print for the Imperial Festival 1877; 1. Tenor von Düsseldorf, coloured drawing (1888); Mann mit Monokel, coloured caricature drawing (1889); Vizekönig Tuan Fang, Pencil drawing (1906).
- Düsseldorf, Stadtmuseum: Josef Schex im Alter von 58 Jahren, Pencil drawing (1877) and more artist caricatures; Der geheimnisvolle Unbekannt, poster (1878).
- Das neue Altargemälde (The new altarpiece) (Boetticher, No. 6: Mayor, parish council and priest of a village look at the new altarpiece in the town hall, which has just been delivered by the artist. Schultes Düsseldorf Art Exhibition 1874; Berlin, Academic Art Exhibition 1874; Munich, Annual Exhibition in the Glass Palace 1876); according to C. M. Seyppel (curriculum vitae, KVM) sold to the U.S.; as wood engraving in Daheim, Jg. 12 (Oct. 1875-Oct. 1876), No. 7, p. 101.
- Der Kouponschneider and Der Flickschneider, (Boetticher, no. 8: Berlin, akademische Kunstausstellung 1876; as woodcuts in: Daheim, Jg. 13 (1876/77), No. 33, pp. 524–525.
- Abschiedstrunk (Farewell drink) in front of a house in the old town, woodcut in Illustrirte Welt, 36th Jg., 1888, p. 264.
- Bildnis eines Düsseldorfer Arztes (Portrait of a Düsseldorf doctor): Düsseldorfer Repräsentativ-Ausstellung, 1888/89 (Düsseldorfer Anzeiger, No. 10, 10 January 1889, pp. 2–3).
- Bildnis Karl Heintges (Portrait of Karl Heintges), 1888: Auktion Karbstein, Düsseldorf, 23 May 2009, no. 51.
- Die Klosterrumpelkammer (The Monastery rumple room) with many objects and cats, oil on canvas, 79 × 63 cm; signed Heintges.

== Publications ==
- Der Blick in's Jenseits : eine kitzliche Geschichte in 25 Bildern. - Düsseldorf : Sauernheimer, 1879. Numerizededition of the ULBD.
- Schlau, schläuer, am schläusten. - Düsseldorf : Bagel, 1882. Numerized edition of the ULBD.
- Er sie es (He she it): painted after nature and written down 1302 years before Christ's birth. - Düsseldorf : Bagel, 1883. Numerized edition of the ULBD
- Die Plagen (The plagues). - Düsseldorf : Bagel, 1884. Numerized edition of the ULBD
- Mein Buch (My book) with drawings on the sides by C. M. Seyppel. - Düsseldorf : Bagel, 1885. Numerized edition of the ULBD
- Roi, reine, prince : récit humoristique égyptien peint et écrit d'apres nature, l'an 1302 avant la naissance de J. C. - Düsseldorf : Bagel, 1886. Numerized edition of the ULBD.
- Schmidt und Smith in Lüderitzland : hottentottisches Blaubuch mit 118 Kritzeleien. - Düsseldorf : Bagel, 1887. Numerized edition of the ULBD.
- Rajadar und Hellmischu : altägypt. Gesang (Rajadar and Hellmishu : ancient Egyptian song). - Berlin : S. Fischer, 1889. Digitised edition of the ULBD.
- Berühmte Männer des vorigen Jahrhunderts : in chromo stampfo fresco scizo magnetischem Lichtdr (Famous men of the last century : in chromo ...). - Düsseldorf : Stümper, 1900. Numerized edition of the university and State Library Düsseldorf.
