= Hermann Wislicenus =

German painter

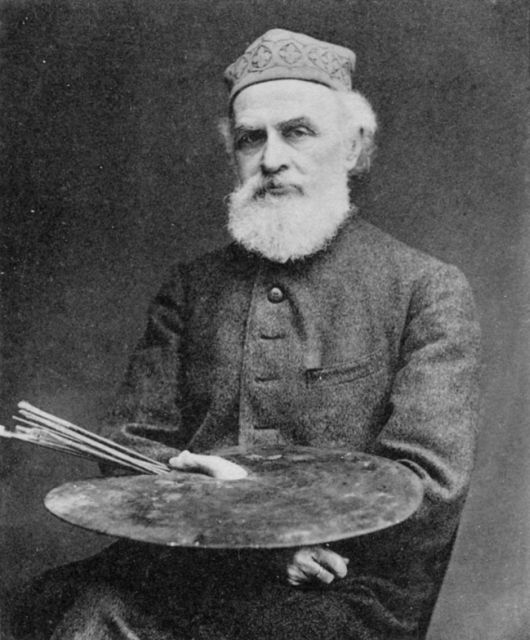
Wislicenus about 1895

Hermann Wislicenus (20 September 1825 – 25 April 1899) was a German historical painter. He is chiefly known for his mural paintings in the Imperial Palace of Goslar.

== Biography ==
Born in Eisenach in the Thuringian Duchy of Saxe-Weimar-Eisenach, Wislicenus studied at the Dresden Academy of Fine Arts and later became a student of Eduard Bendemann and Julius Schnorr. His first art work, "Abundance and Destitution," was purchased by the Dresden Gallery in 1853. A stipend from the Grand Duke of Weimar enabled him to study in Italy (1853–1857) where he lived in Rome and became a follower of Peter von Cornelius and the Nazarene movement.

Upon his return to Germany, he settled in Weimar and opened his own studio. In Spring 1868, he was appointed professor at the Düsseldorf Academy. In 1872 several of his works perished in a devastating fire and were re-created by Wislicenus in the following years.

== Works ==
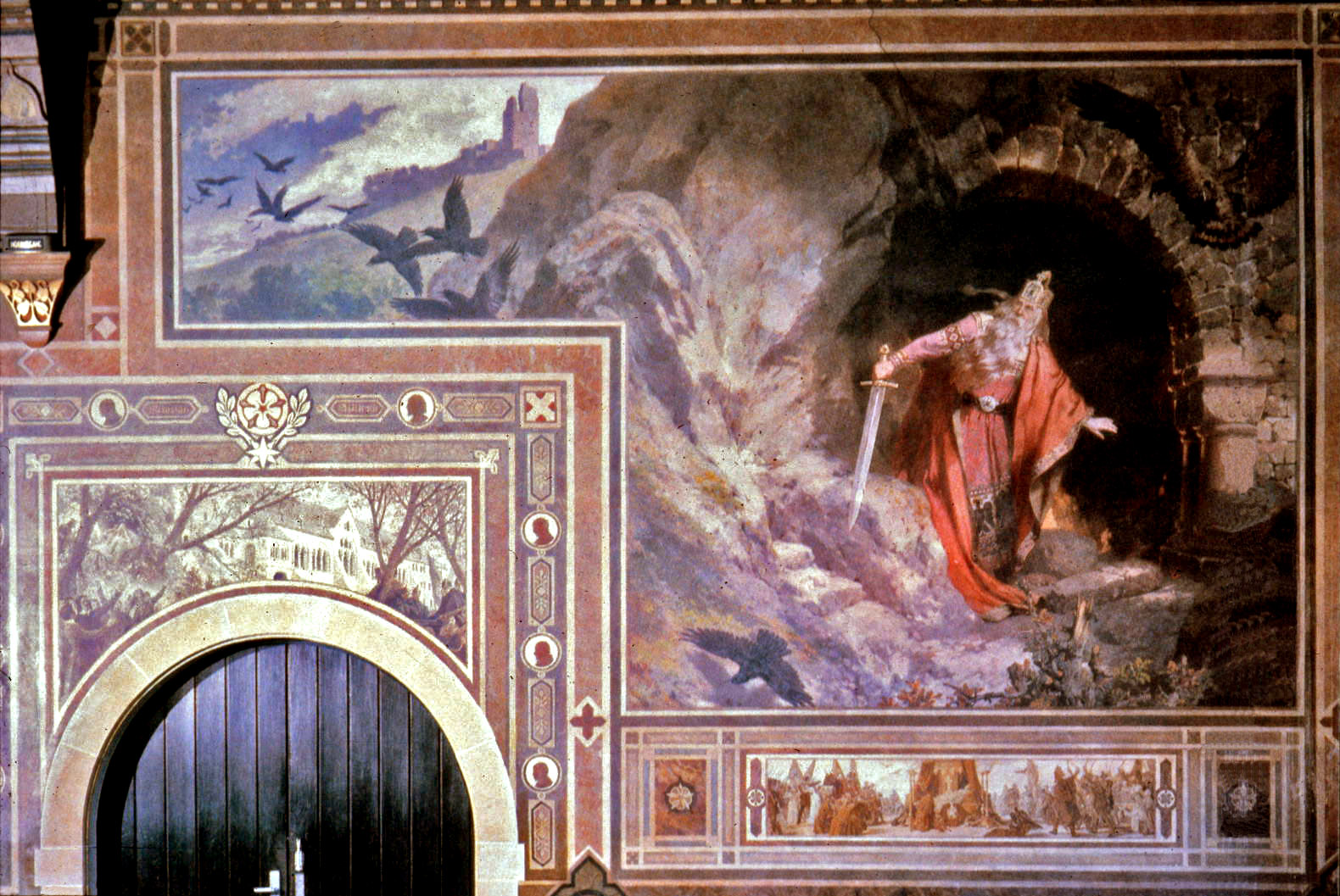
Barbarossa's awakening, Imperial Palace, Goslar

In an 1877 competition for the decoration of the restored Goslar Kaiserpfalz, he won the first prize, and, assisted by some of his pupils, within twenty years completed a series of 68 frescoes postulating a continuity of imperial rule from Charlemagne to the Prussian-led German Empire. In the course of German unification, the Imperial Palace, after century-long decay, was under restoration since 1868. Wislicenus's pictorial agenda became an icon of the Romantic recourse to medieval traditions that served the inner identity of the 'Lesser German' Reich established in 1871.

Among other oil paintings, watercolors, and cartoons, he executed "Night With Its Retinue," for the Grand Duke of Weimar, the "Myth of Prometheus" (1862, Leipzig Museum), "The Flood of Deucalion" (1865, Weimar Museum); the mural paintings "Brutus as Judge of his Sons" and "The Mother of the Gracchi," in the staircase of the Härtel Roman House at Leipzig; "Fancy Borne by the Dreams" (Schaek Gallery, Munich); "Angels Singing Psalms," mural painting (Grand-ducal chapel, Weimar). In Düsseldorf, he painted "The Four Seasons" (1877, National Gallery, Berlin).

== Sources ==
- Gilman, D. C.; Peck, H. T.; Colby, F. M., eds. (1905). "Wislicenus, Hermann" . New International Encyclopedia (1st ed.). New York: Dodd, Mead.
- Siegfried Gehrecke: Hermann Wislicenus 1825–1899, Verlag Erich Goltze, Göttingen 1987, ISBN 3-88452-830-0
