= Eduard Bendemann =

German painter (1811–1889)

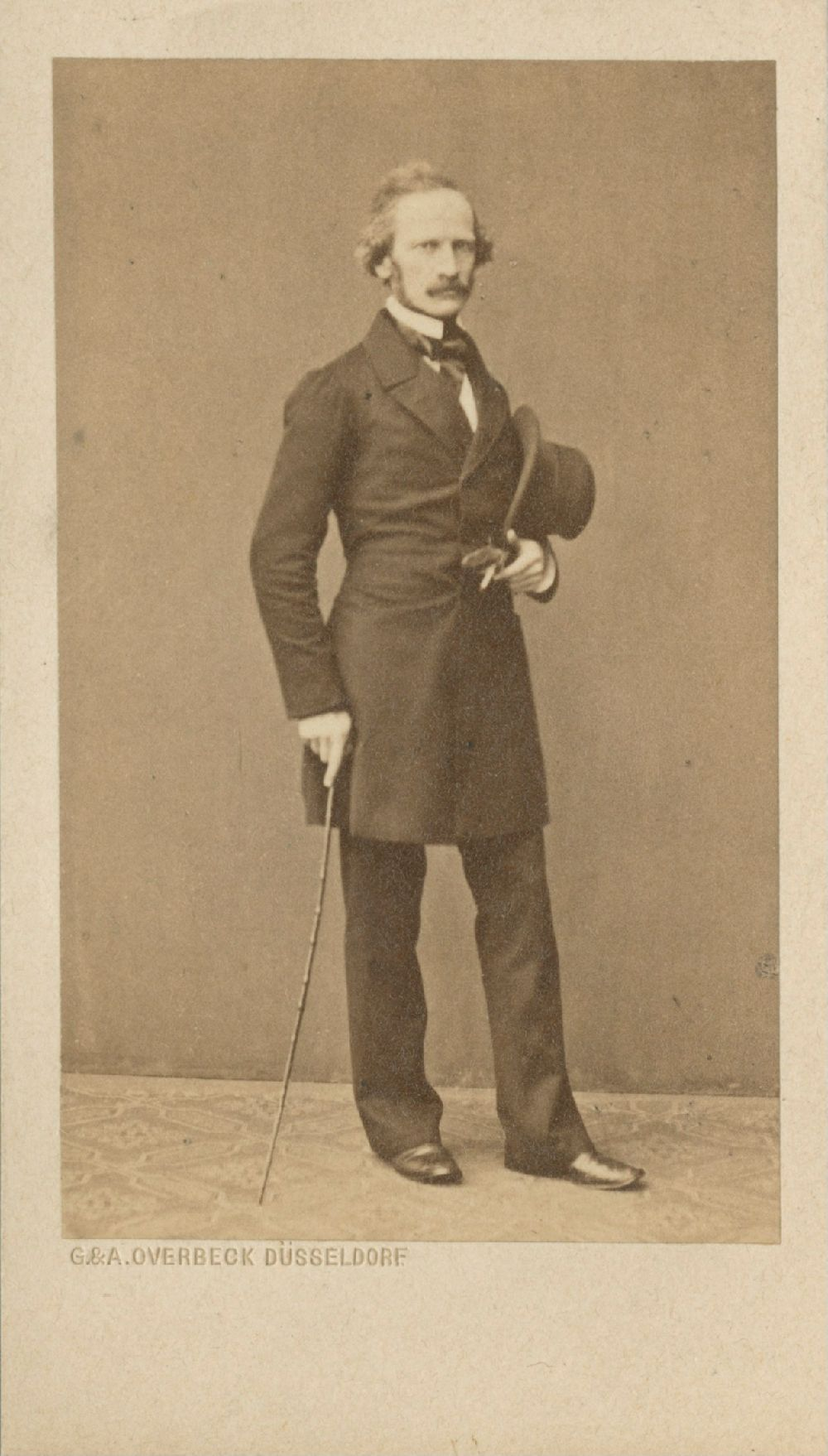
- Eduard Bendemann by G. & A. Overbeck (firm)
- Born: Eduard Julius Friedrich Bendemann; 3 December 1811; Berlin
- Died: 27 December 1889 (aged 78); Düsseldorf, German Empire
- Known for: Painting

Eduard Julius Friedrich Bendemann (3 December 1811 – 27 December 1889) was a German-Jewish painter.

== Biography ==
Bendemann was born in Berlin. His father, Anton Heinrich Bendemann, was a Jewish banker. His mother, Fanny Eleonore Bendemann née von Halle, was a daughter of the Jewish banker Joel Samuel von Halle. His father monitored his education closely and it would have naturally led him to some sort of technical occupation, but his talent and propensity towards art resulted in his being allowed to pursue other interests. After he completed elementary school, he enrolled in the Wilhelm von Schadow's school in Düsseldorf. In 1828 he painted a portrait of his grandmother which attracted some attention. In 1830 he went on a school trip to Italy where he remained for a year.

After a series of jobs, among them with Boas and Ruth, his talent as an artist began to show, especially with his very large 1832 painting titled, The Jews Mourning in Exile which was featured in the Berlin art exhibition. The picture garnered a great deal of attention, which was in part due to the deep and simple feeling and the noble composition of the piece, and finally went to the Wallraf-Richartz Museum in Cologne. Bendemann's second picture, The Two Girls at the Well (1832), was acquired by the North Rhine-Westphalia Art Association. Soon thereafter followed Jeremiah amid the Ruins of Jerusalem for which the artist received a medal in Paris in 1837. This painting was for the most part about the progress of the Jews in Babylon (Royal Palace in Hanover). His best known work is The Harvest. The artist’s first fresco was a symbolic representation of the art at the “Poetry Well” at the house of his parents-in-law in Berlin.

In the year 1838, Bendemann was appointed professor of the Dresden Academy of Fine Arts. He soon had the opportunity to paint even larger frescos. He was commissioned to decorate three halls of the Dresden royal palace with wall paintings: the throne room, the tower room, and the tower hall. In the throne room, on both sides of the throne, there are representations of important rulers and legislators in gold leaf with smaller representations in relief form below, from Moses up to Albert III, Duke of Saxony. On the wall facing the throne there are four paintings depicting events from the life of King Heinrich I each with other pictures attached which explain each of the four events. This exacting work occupied the greater part of his time for fifteen years. From 1859 to 1867, he was director of the Düsseldorf Academy.

Bendemann's uncle was Benedict Heinrich Bendix, noted engraver.

Bendemann died in Düsseldorf.

In 1891, barely 13 months after his death, an estate exhibition of his works was held at the Kunsthalle Düsseldorf, after his widow had previously had the œuvre presented in Berlin, his native city. In these exhibitions, in addition to paintings, sketches and drawing studies made by Bendemann were also shown.

== Family ==
- Felix und Lida Schadow - Felix Schadow and his sister Lida Schadow, later wife of Eduard Bendemann. Painting by Franz Krüger.
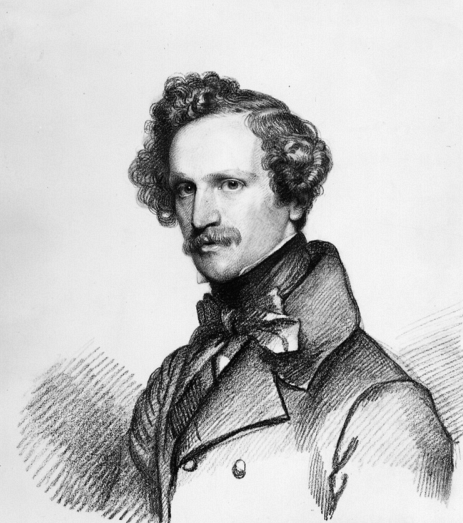
  Portrait of Bendemann by Carl Christian Vogel von Vogelstein, chalk on paper, 1838
- On 28 October 1838 Eduard Bendemann married Lida Schadow (1821–1850), daughter of the famous sculptor Johann Gottfried Schadow and sister of Wilhelm von Schadow. Their children:
  - Gottfried Arnold Bendemann (born 1839, Dresden - 1882), Major, Ritter d. Pour le Mérite m. Hedwig Krüger. Their son is Friedrich Bendemann.
  - Marie Euler Bendemann (born 1841, Dresden – 1874) m. Otto Euler, Councillor of Justice (German: Justizrat). Their son is Eduard Euler, a painter.
  - Ernst Julius Bendemann (born 1844, Dresden – ?) m. Alwine Jung
  - Fanny Mathilde Susanne Bendemann (born 1846, Dresden – ?)
  - Felix Eduard Robert Emil Bendemann (born 1848, Dresden – 1915, Berlin), Royal Admiral, 1905 ennobled m. Helene Sophia Sturz, daughter of Brazilian consul general in Berlin Joh. Jac. Sturz. Their son Eduard, likewise a painter, married the famous female philosopher of Judaism Margarete Susman.
  - Rudolf Christian Eugen Bendemann (1851–1884), historic painter
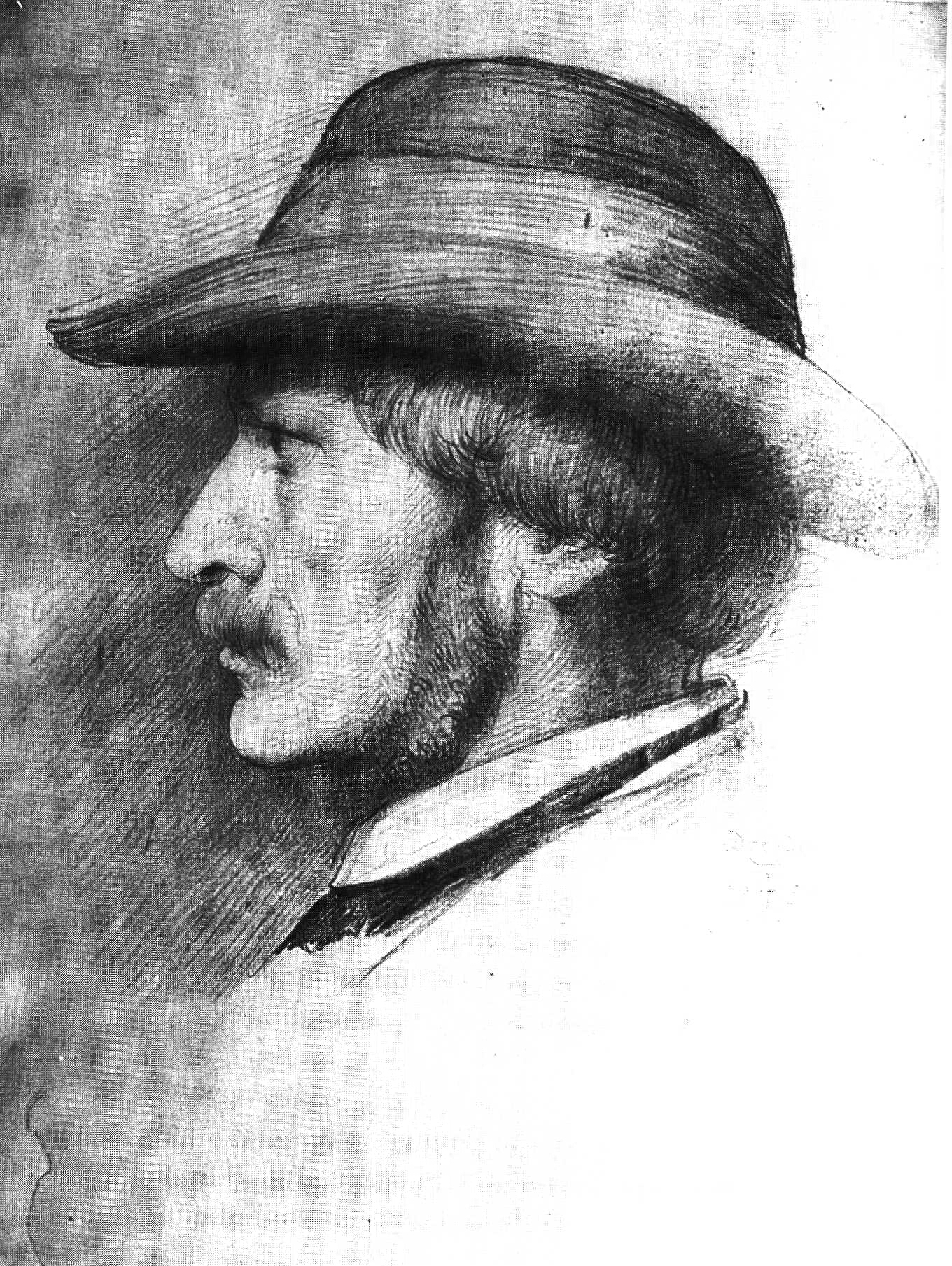
    Eduard Bendemann, Self-Portrait, 1859

== Works ==
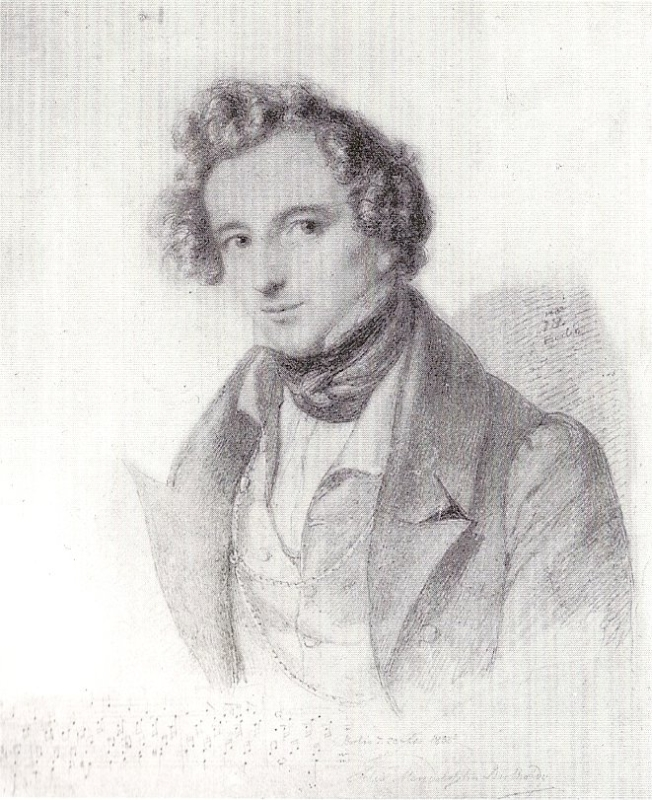
Felix Mendelssohn Bartholdy

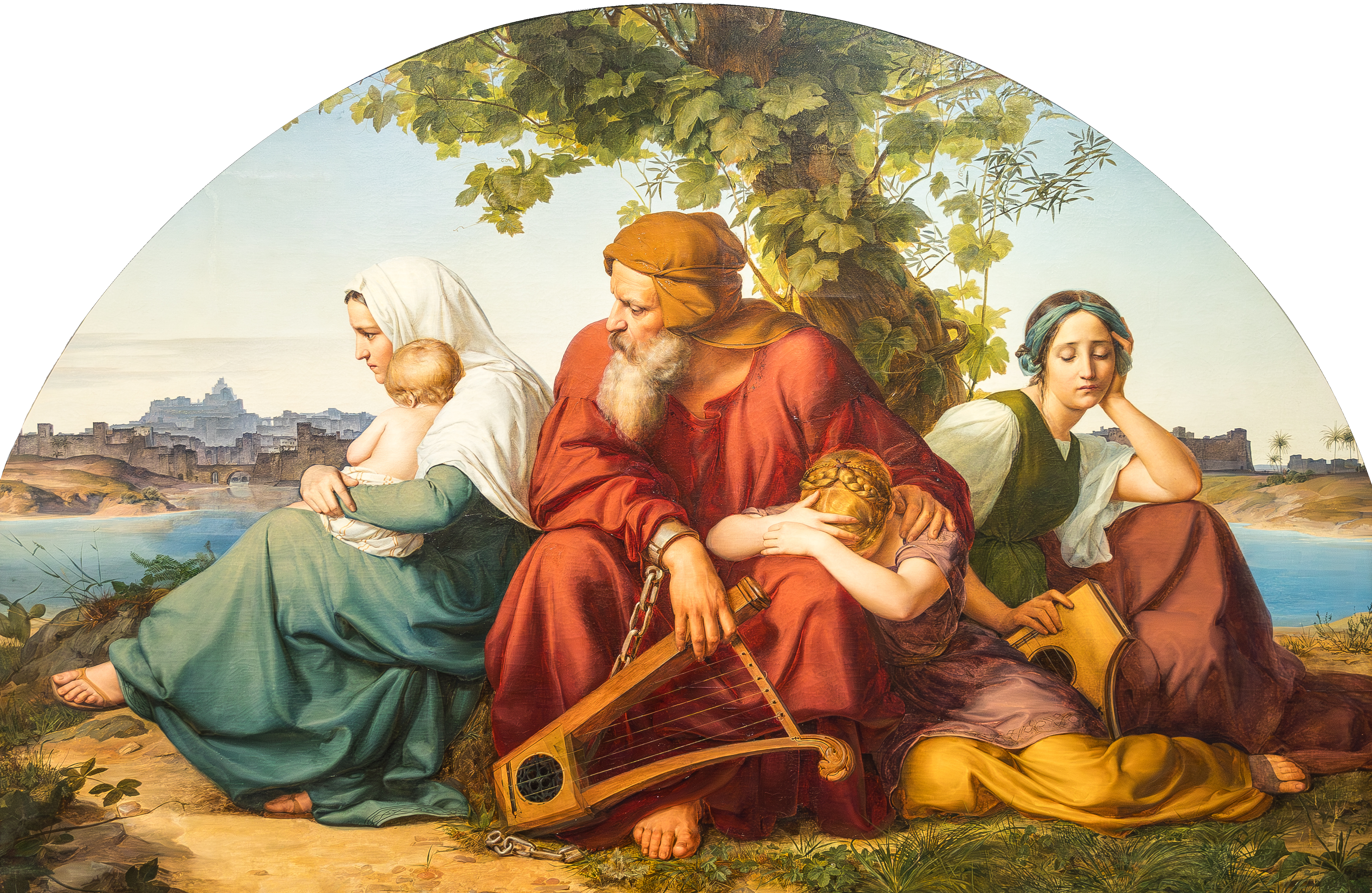
- The Mourning Jews in Exile, c. 1832
  Boas und Ruth
- Die trauernden Juden im Exil (1832)
- Zwei Mädchen am Brunnen (1832)
- Felix Mendelssohn Bartholdy (1833)
- Jeremias auf den Trümmern von Jerusalem (1837)
- Die Künste am Brunnen der Poesie (fresco)
- Die Ernte
- Wegführung der trauernden Juden in die babylonische Gefangenschaft (1872)
- Nathan der Weise
- Penelope (1877)

== Literature ==
- Sigrid Achenbach (ed.): Eduard Bendemann, 1811–1889. Die Werke in den Staatlichen Museen zu Berlin und im Mendelssohn-Archiv der Staatsbibliothek zu Berlin Preußischer Kulturbesitz. Katalog zur Ausstellung des Kupferstichkabinetts Eduard Bendemann. Zeichnungen, Alte Nationalgalerie, 16.11.2007 – 24.02.2008, Berlin: G+H Verlag, 2007.
- Silke Brandmeier: Die Künste am Brunnen der Poesie, Berlin Schadow-Gesellschaft, 2000.
- Margarete Braun-Ronsdorf (1955). "Bendemann, Eduard". Neue Deutsche Biographie (in German). Vol. 2. Berlin: Duncker & Humblot. pp. 36–37.
- Eduard Daelen (1902). "Bendemann, Eduard" . Allgemeine Deutsche Biographie (in German). Vol. 46. Leipzig: Duncker & Humblot. pp. 348–350.
- Josef Schrattenholz: Eduard Bendemann. Betrachtungen und Erinnerungen, Düsseldorf, 1891.

== See also ==
- List of German painters
- Düsseldorf school of painting
- Kunstakademie Düsseldorf
- Berlin University of the Arts
- Dresden Academy of Fine Arts
- Felix von Bendemann
