= Kaspar Braun =

German artist (1807–1877)

Kaspar Braun (13 August 1807 – 29 October 1877) was a German wood engraver.

== Biography ==
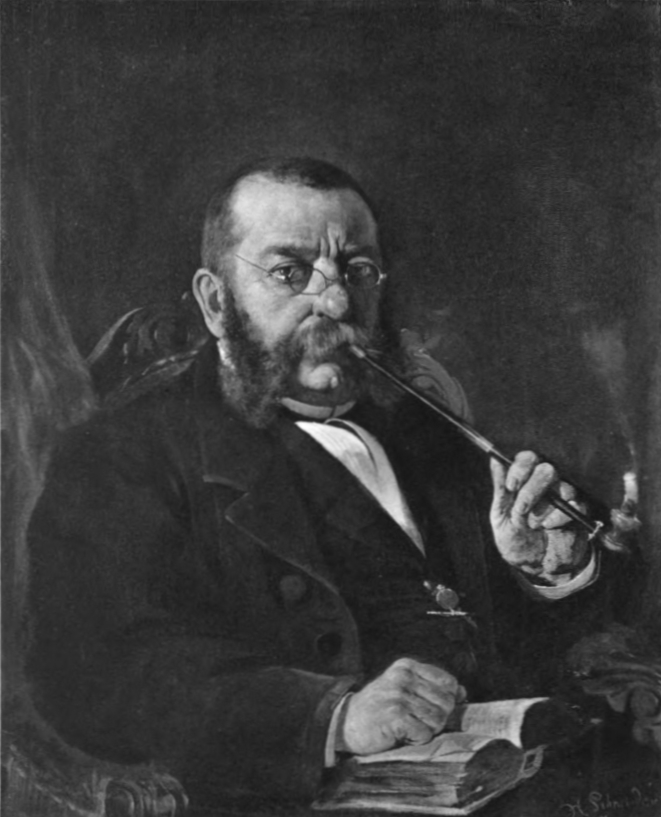
Kaspar Braun

He was born at Aschaffenburg, first studied painting in the Munich Academy, and then turned his attention to wood engraving, in which he received instruction from Brevières in Paris and Dessauer in Munich, and in this branch of art he made his career. In conjunction with Dessauer, he established a graphic art institute in Munich in 1839. He became associated with Friedrich Schneider in 1843, and established the humorous publication Fliegende Blätter.

== Works ==
Among the numerous works to which he contributed engravings are the following:

- Das Nibelungenlied, after the drawings of Schnorr and Neureuther
- Volkskalender, with illustrations after Kaulbach and Cornelius
- Göttz von Berlichingen
- Münchner Bilderbogen
