= St. Apollinaire =

St. Apollinaire may refer to:

== People ==
- Apollinaris of Ravenna
- Apollinaris (disambiguation)

== Geography and churches ==
=== Czech Republic ===
- Church of St. Apollinaire, Prague
- Kostel svatého Apolináře (cs) Modlany

=== France and Quebec ===
- Saint-Apollinaire (disambiguation)
- Église Saint-Apollinaire (fr) Meximieux
- Saint-Appolinaire, Rhône a commune in the Rhône department in eastern France.

=== Germany ===
- St Apollinaris (de) in Düsseldorf
- St Apollinaris (de) in Lindlar
- St. Apollinaris (Obermaubach) in Kreuzau
- Apollinariskirche, Remagen
- St. Apollinaris (Grunewald) in Wermelskirchen
- St. Apollinaris (de) in Winnerath

=== Italy ===
- Sant'Apollinare (disambiguation)
- Basilica of Sant'Apollinare in Classe, Ravenna
- Sant’Apollinare Nuovo, Ravenna
- Sant'Apollinare alle Terme Neroniane-Alessandrine, Rome
