= Calderini =

Calderini is an Italian surname. Notable people with the surname include:

- Apollinare Calderini (16th-17th century), Italian Catholic clergyman and writer
- Domizio Calderini (1444–1478), Italian Renaissance humanist and scholar
- Marco Calderini (1850–1944), Italian painter
- Elio Calderini (born 1988), Italian footballer

== See also ==
- Calderoni
