= Joseph Euler =

20th-century German politician

Joseph Ignaz Euler (20 February 1804 – 27 October 1886) was a Prussian notary and politician of the democratic movement.

== Life ==
Born in Düsseldorf, Euler was a son of the chancery and city court procurator Adrian Euler (1768-1837) and his second wife Josepha née Wilbertz († 1821), who bore the latter thirteen children. After his school education, law studies at the Universität Heidelberg and a trip to Italy and Switzerland, which was financed by paternal grants, Joseph Euler embarked on a career as a notary public. He obtained his first position in Leichlingen, after which he was a notary in Opladen. In 1831, he married Antonie Blin (b. 1812), who bore him four children: Eduard (* 1833), Otto (1835-1925), Berta Margarete Luise (* 1837) and Sophie (b. 1839). In 1837, Euler took over his father's office and notary title in Düsseldorf. He invested his money in properties in Flingern. For economic reasons, the former manor house was later sold to the city, which built the Eulerhof housing estate on the property in the 1920s, named after the Euler estate that once stood there.

In March 1842, the Ober procurator, an organ of the administration of justice in Prussia, instigated an investigation into an alleged misconduct on Euler's part. Euler defended himself against the accusation by writing a defence. This resulted in a specialist publication entitled Über das Notariat in Rheinpreußen mit Rückblicken auf die altpreußischen Provinzen und Frankreich (Leipzig 1844). This was later followed by the publication Handbuch des Notariats in Preußen (Düsseldorf 1858). Both publications earned him high recognition. As a co-founder of the Notariatsverein für Deutschland und Österreich, he was elected its chairman on 7 October 1871. He also played a leading role when the Düsseldorf society Verein was founded in 1842/1843 from the merger of the Lese-, Casino- und Kaufmannsgesellschaft. In 1845 he was one of the founders of the Düsseldorfer Allgemeine Versicherungsgesellschaft für See-, Fluß- und Landtransporte, and in 1848 of the Malkasten. He was also a member of the Dampfschiffahrts-Gesellschaft für den Nieder- und Mittelrhein. In addition, Euler, whose circle of friends and acquaintances included, for example, the composer Robert Schumann and the pianist and composer Clara Schumann, a patron of Düsseldorf's musical life. A notary and judicial councillor, he played the violin in the Düsseldorf orchestra as an aficionado, and as a board member he supported the Städtischer Musikverein zu Düsseldorf from 1845, especially in the preparation of Lower Rhenish Music Festival. A private performance of Bach's Toccata and Fugue in F major by Johannes Brahms took place in Euler's house in autumn 1853.

From the time of the Vormärz, Euler was politically active. After a session of the 7th Rhenish Provincial Diet had rejected the draft of a new Prussian Criminal Code as a backward concept compared to the current Rhenish law and when thereupon the people of Cologne and Düsseldorf held a joyful torchlight procession on 22 June 1843 (Köln-Düsseldorfer Verbrüder). June 1843 held a joyous torchlight procession (Köln-Düsseldorfer Verbrüderungsfest), Euler was one of the initiators of a festival in honour of the Diet, which was held in the Beckerschen Gartenlokal in Düsseldorf on 4 July 1843, to the displeasure of the Prussian authorities. In the year of the March Revolution, Euler stood as a candidate for the Prussian National Assembly as a member of the Verein für demokratische Monarchie, which aspired to a constitutional monarchy, and was elected as a people's representative on 8 May 1848. The Düsseldorf Anton Bloem - like him a member of the bourgeois-democratic movement of the Rhine Province - was also elected to the popular representation that was to give Prussia a new constitution. In new elections the following year, Euler was no longer able to assert himself. Düsseldorf had been a centre of demands for civil liberties during the revolution. Riots that led to the imposition of a state of siege culminated in bloody barricade fights in 1849. After the state of siege was lifted, new democratic associations were formed, in which supporters of the Verein für demokratische Monarchie and some reform conservatives significantly joined forces. One of these associations was the Democratic Association, of which Joseph Euler became the chairman. In 1878, Euler ran for the Prussian House of Representatives.

The Prussian state honoured Joseph Euler in 1874 by awarding him the title of Justizrat and the Order of the Red Eagle fourth class. He died in Düsseldorf in 1886 at the age of 82 after a long illness.

== Important descendants ==
- Euler's first son, Eduard Euler, became a notary in Aachen.
- Daughter Berta married the painter Benjamin Vautier, who sat on the board of directors of the Kunstverein für die Rheinlande und Westfalen.
- Daughter Sophie married the pastor Carl Herbst.
- Euler's second son, Otto Euler, also became a notary. He worked as a lawyer in Düsseldorf until 1892. He was also politically and socially active. From 1879 to 1908 he was a member of the Zentrumspartei, ultimately as its leader, in the city parliament. His art-loving parents, his marriage to Marie Henriette Bendemann (the daughter of the painter Eduard Bendemann and granddaughter of Johann Gottfried Schadow) and his friendship with the painters Ernst Deger, Franz Ittenbach, Karl and Andreas Müller led Otto into the milieu of the Düsseldorf school of painting. As a member of the board of directors and chairman of the Alte Kunsthalle, he was active in the cultural development of his city. Otto's son Eduard (1867-1931) became a Landschaftsmaler.

== Publications ==
- Über das Notariat in Rheinpreußen mit Rückblicken auf die altpreußischen Provinzen und Frankreich, Leipzig 1844
- Handbuch des Notariats in Preußen, Schaub’sche Buchhandlung, Düsseldorf 1858 (Online)
