= Appolinaire =

Appolinaire, Apollinaire, Apollinare or Apolinaire may refer to:

- Apollinaire Bouchardat (1809–1886), French pharmacist and hygienist
- Apollinaire Joachim Kyélem de Tambèla (born 1955), Prime Minister of Burkina Faso
- Appolinaire Djikeng, Cameroonian biologist
- Appolinaire Djingabeye (born 1993), Chadian professional football player
- Apollinaire de Kontski (1825–1879), Polish violinist, teacher and minor composer
- Apolinaire Stephen (born 1995), Vanuatuan cricketer
- Guillaume Apollinaire (1880–1918), French poet

== Apollinare ==
- Apollinare Calderini, a 16th-17th-century Italian Catholic clergyman and writer
- Apollinare Osadca (1916–1997), Ukrainian-American architect
- Apollinare Offredi, a 15th-century Italian philosopher

== See also ==
- Saint-Apollinaire (disambiguation)
- Sant'Apollinare (disambiguation)
