= Apollinaris =

Apollinaris may refer to:

== Personal name ==
- Apollinaris, a correspondent of Pliny the Younger (61–c. 112)
- Apollinaris of Ravenna (flourished 1st or 2nd century), martyr and first bishop of Ravenna, the most prominent of several saints called Apollinaris
- Apollinarius (astrologer), a first or second century AD astrologer
- Apollinaris Claudius, Apollinaris of Hierapolis or Apollinaris the Apologist (flourished 2nd century), bishop of Hierapolis and saint
- Apollinaris (the Elder) (flourished 4th century), Christian grammarian
- Apollinaris of Laodicea or the Younger, also known as Apollinarius of Laodicea (died 390), bishop of Laodicea in Syria, author of the heresy of Apollinarism
- Apollinaris Syncletica, also known as Dorotheus (5th century), female desert ascetic, Catholic and Eastern Orthodox saint
- Apollinaris of Clermont (died 515), son of Sidonius Apollinaris
- Apollinarius (governor), Byzantine governor of the Balearic Islands (flourished 530s)
- Patriarch Apollinarius of Alexandria (died 569), Greek Patriarch of Alexandria
- Apollinaris of Valence (453–520), bishop of Valence and saint
- Saint Apollinaris of Monte Cassino (died 827 or 828), abbot of Monte Cassino
- Saint Apollinaris of Sarsina (flourished 1158), bishop of Sarsina
- Blessed Apollinaris Franco (died 1622), Franciscan friar, martyred in Japan, see list of saints and blesseds in the 17th century

== Ancient Rome ==
- Sidonius Apollinaris (died before 490), Gallo-Roman writer, bishop and saint
- Sulpicius Apollinaris, 2nd century Latin grammarian from Carthage
- Legio XV Apollinaris, a Roman legion

== Other uses ==
- Apollinaris (brand), a German effervescent mineral water named after Saint Apollinaris of Ravenna
- Lily of the valley of Convallaria majalis, flowering plant also historically known as Apollonaris

== See also ==
- Apollonius (disambiguation)
- Appolinaire (disambiguation), including Apollinaire, Apolinare or Apolinaire
- Apolinar, a given name
- Apolinary, also spelled Apollinary, a given name
- Apolinario Mabini (1864–1903), Filipino philosopher, politician and revolutionary
- Apollinarism, a Christological heresy
