= Andreas Müller (painter) =

German painter (1811–1890)

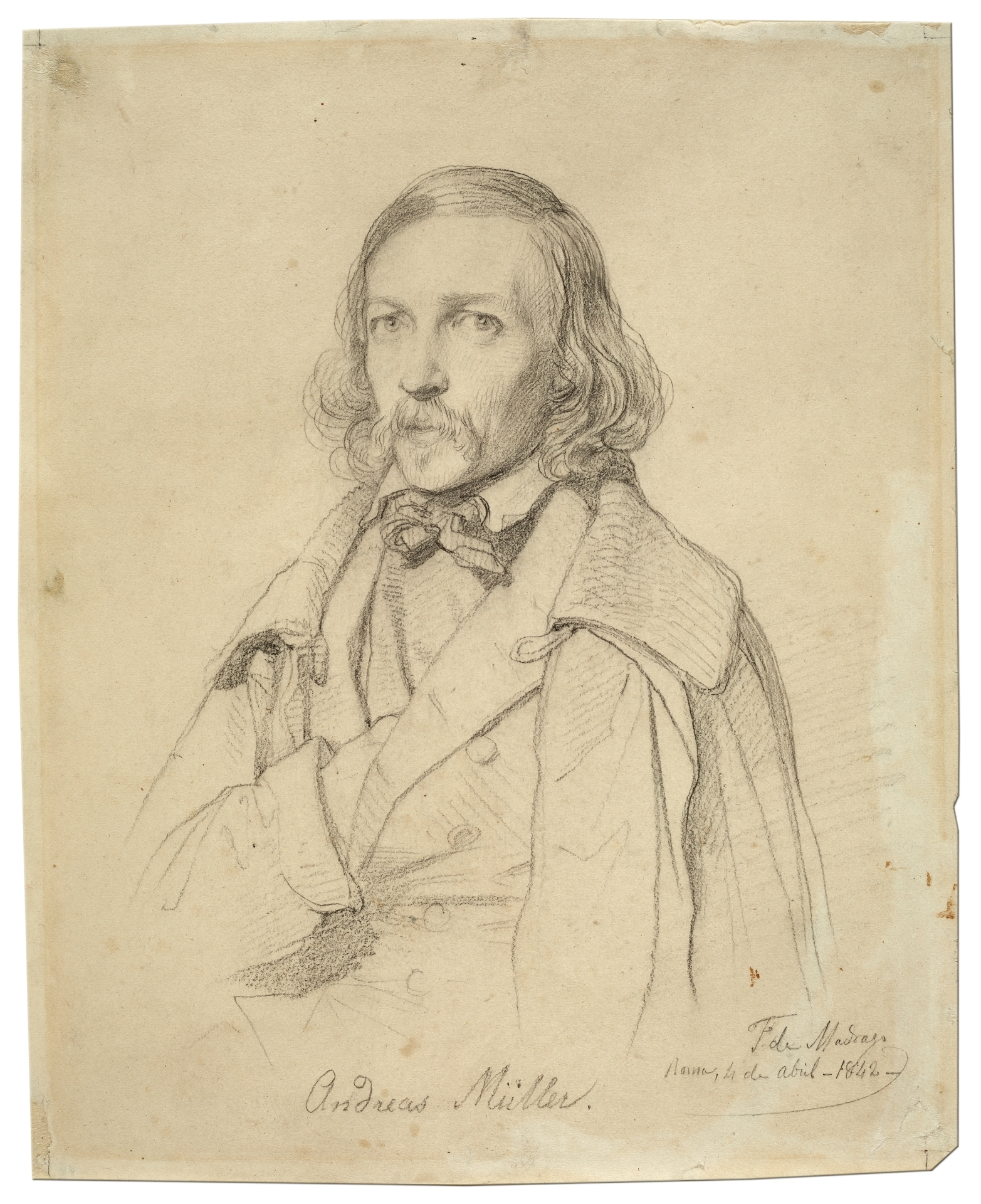
Andreas Müller; by Federico de Madrazo (1842)

Andreas Johann Jacob Heinrich Müller (19 February 1811, Kassel – 29 March 1890, Düsseldorf) was a German religious artist; associated with the Düsseldorfer Malerschule.

== Biography ==
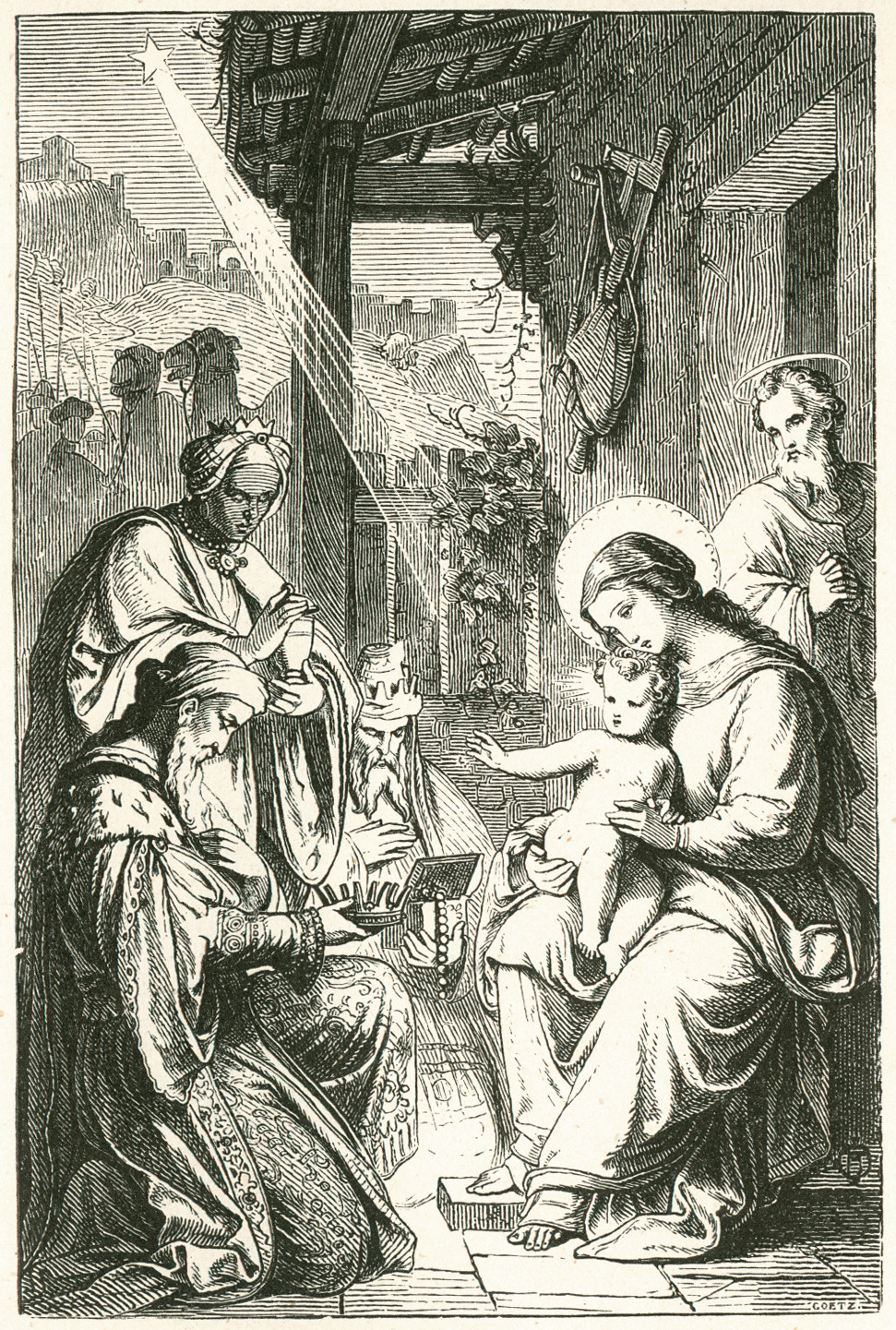
The Three Wise Men

He was the son of a court painter, Franz Hubert Müller who, in 1817, became Director of the Grand Ducal gallery in Darmstadt. His younger brother, Karl was also an artist. He received his first art lessons from his father then, in 1833, enrolled at the Academy of Fine Arts, Munich, where he studied with Julius Schnorr von Carolsfeld and Peter von Cornelius. The following year, to improve his oil painting techniques, he transferred to the Kunstakademie Düsseldorf, under the direction of Friedrich Wilhelm von Schadow. Under the influence of Ernst Deger, he turned to religious art, which had already begun to interest him in Munich. His first work in that genre, "Three Singing Angels", was purchased by Prince Adolphus, Duke of Cambridge in 1836.

This enabled him to accompany Deger to Italy in 1837 where, in Rome, he joined the Nazarene movement. In 1840, he married Maria Katharina Schweden (1814–1883), the daughter of a Master saddler. The following year, he returned to Düsseldorf with Maria and his newborn son, Joseph.

Together with Deger, his brother Karl, and Franz Ittenbach, he was commissioned by Count Franz Egon von Fürstenberg-Stammheim to create wall paintings at the Apollinariskirche, Remagen. That project occupied him from 1843 to 1851. Most of the work was done under his direction, but his personal contribution consisted of four panels near the transept, depicting the life of Saint Apollinaris. He also did smaller figures of various patron saints, associated with the noble families who were financing the work.

In 1855, he was appointed a Professor at the Kunstakademie, succeeding Karl Josef Ignatz Mosler, who had retired. In that position, he taught art history and served as curator of the Krahe Art Collection. In 1872, he and a group of young students were able to save the collection, during a fire that destroyed much of Düsseldorf Castle. Several of his own works, in his studio, including an almost completed altarpiece, were lost. It took him until 1877 to redo it.

His teaching left him less time to devote to his paintings. Nevertheless, he became involved in restorative work; notably on an Assumption by Rubens, at the request of Adolf I, Prince of Schaumburg-Lippe. A major restoration at Bückeburg Castle, also on behalf of Prince Adolf, was incomplete when he suffered a major stroke in 1881. It left him paralyzed and unable to speak until his death in 1890, shortly after his seventy-ninth birthday.

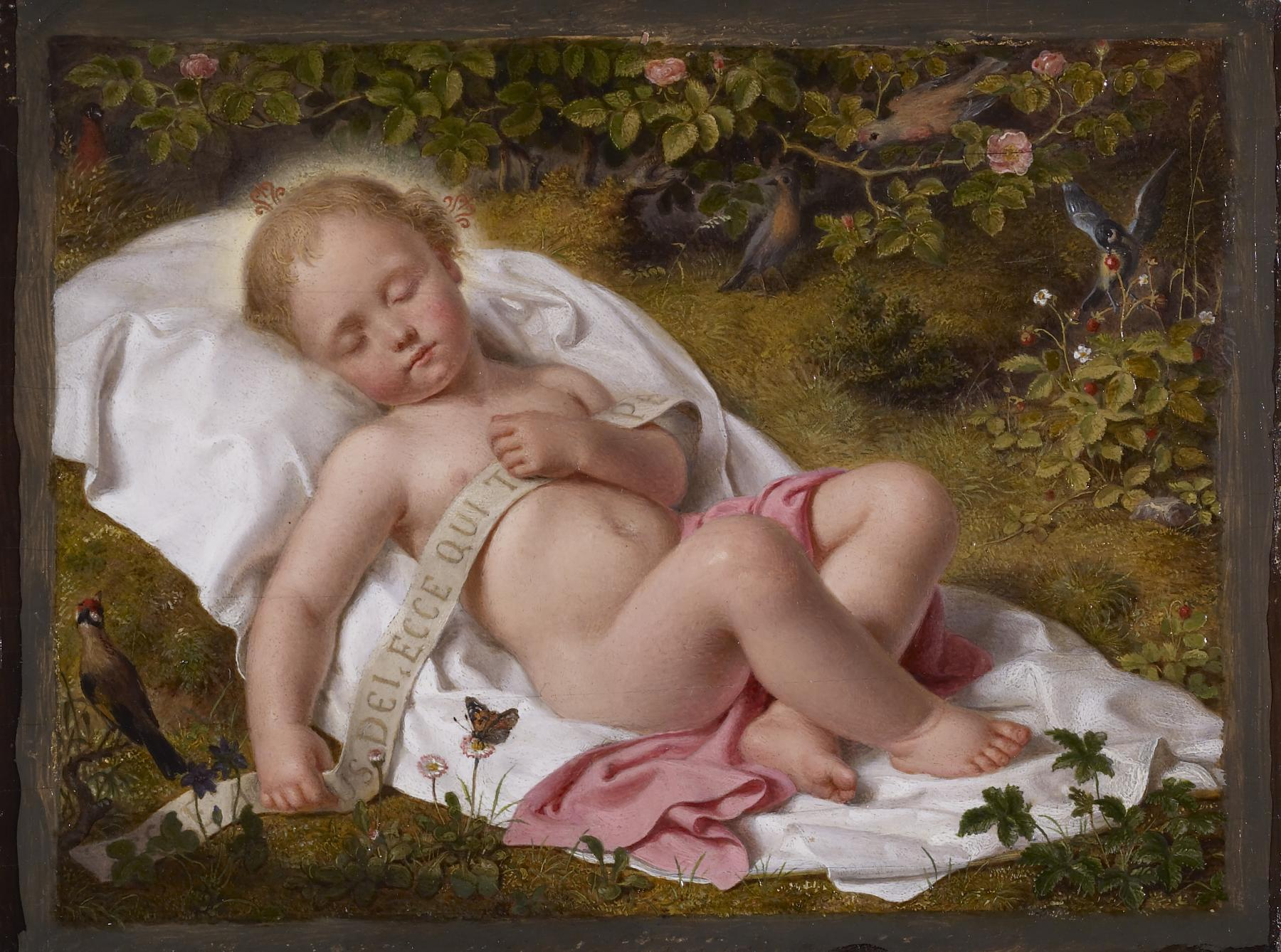
The Christ Child (1849), Walters Art Museum
