= Offredi =

Offredi is an Italian surname. Notable people with the surname include:

- Andrea Offredi (born 1988), Italian footballer
- Apollinare Offredi, 15th-century Italian philosopher
- Daniel Offredi (born 1988), Italian footballer
