= Franz Egon von Fürstenberg =

Franz Egon von Fürstenberg may refer to:

- Franz Egon von Fürstenberg-Heiligenberg
- Franz Egon von Fürstenberg (1737–1825)
- Franz Egon von Fürstenberg-Stammheim
