= Camillo Cabutti =

Italian painter

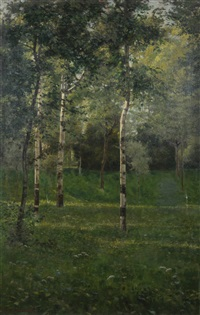
Verde solitudine, 1905

Camillo Cabutti or Camillo Filippo Cabutti (1863–1922) was an Italian painter, mainly of landscapes in an impressionist style.

== Biography ==
He was born in Bossolasco in Cuneo. He attended the Accademia Albertina, and studied with Marco Calderini He was a resident of Turin during most of his career. In 1884 at Turin, he exhibited the following canvases: Fusain; Pascolo; Sere nelle Langhe; and All'ombra. In 1886 at Milan he displayed three canvases: Crepuscolo invernale; Mattino di gennaio; and Il bosco in Febbraio. In 1886, at the Promotrice Exposition of Florence he exhibited: Al rezzo dei castagni and Mattino della Valletta (also exhibited in Venice in 1887). His Mattino di primavera, painted in 1907, is now in the Galleria Civica d’Arte Moderna of Turin. Cabutti died in Turin in 1922.
