= Karl Müller (painter) =

German painter (1818-1893)

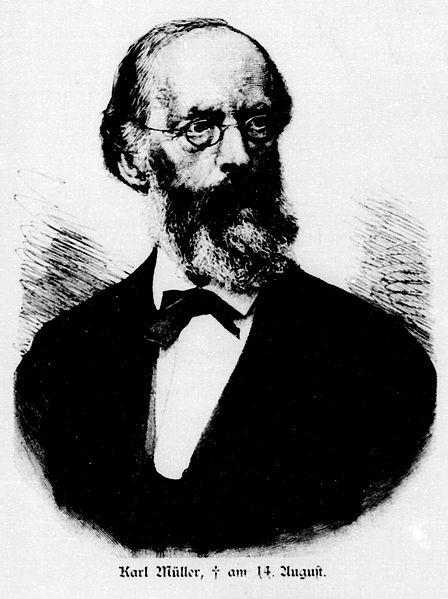
Karl Müller, from the Illustrirte Zeitung (1893)

Karl Müller, also Carl Müller (29 October 1818 – 15 August 1893) was a German late Nazarene painter of the Düsseldorf school of painting.

== Life ==
Born in Darmstadt, Müller was the son of the court painter and gallery director Franz Hubert Müller (1784–1835). Like his older brothers Andreas and Constantin, he attended the Düsseldorf Art Academy after training with his father, where he was enrolled from 1835. After initial lessons with Karl Ferdinand Sohn, he was instructed there from 1836 by Friedrich Wilhelm von Schadow. He was listed as his Meisterschüler in 1849/1850.

In 1839 he undertook a trip to Italy with Franz Ittenbach, accompanied by Schadow, to study fresco painting of the Quattrocento. From 1840 to 1842 he lived in Rome, where he met, among others, Peter von Cornelius and Friedrich Overbeck. From there, he undertook study trips to Tuscany and Umbria. In spring 1843, he studied the monumental Cornelius frescoes in the Munich Ludwigskirche.

From 1844 to 1850, he worked together with Ernst Deger, Ittenbach and his brother Andreas on the painting of the Apollinariskirche in Remagen, a major work of late-Nazarene painting of the Düsseldorf School. In 1857, Müller became professor of history painting at the Düsseldorf Academy and a member of the supervisory board of the Kunstverein für die Rheinlande und Westfalen. From this time on, Müller prepared for the painting of the pilgrimage church Notre-Dame de la Garde in Marseille, a work that was planned for a painting period of ten years, but was not carried out due to financing problems and the Franco-Prussian War.

Together with Karl Woermann, Müller represented the Düsseldorf Academy in 1877 at the inauguration of the New Building of the Academy of Arts Vienna. From 1883 to 1893, Müller took over the direction of the Kunstakademie Düsseldorf from Hermann Wislicenus after disputes arose over the latter's person. Also until 1893, he was in charge of the academy's "Hall of Antiquities".

Müller died in Bad Neuenahr at the age of 74.

== Work ==
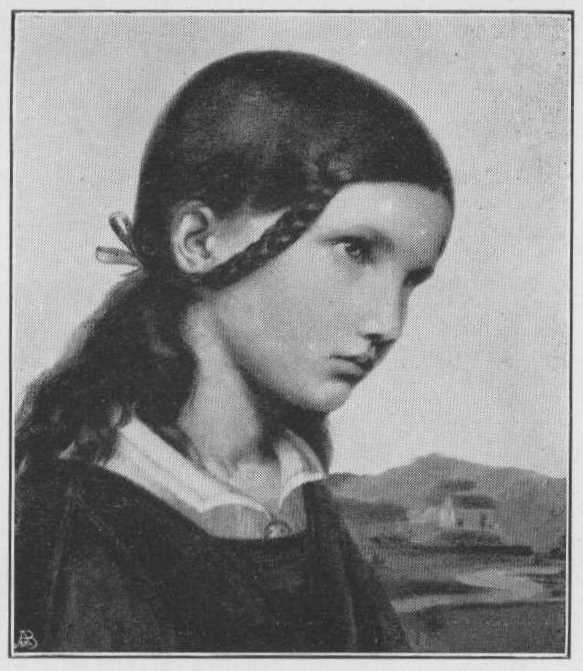
Mädchenkopf, 1835 (Schwarz-Weiß-Foto, 1906)

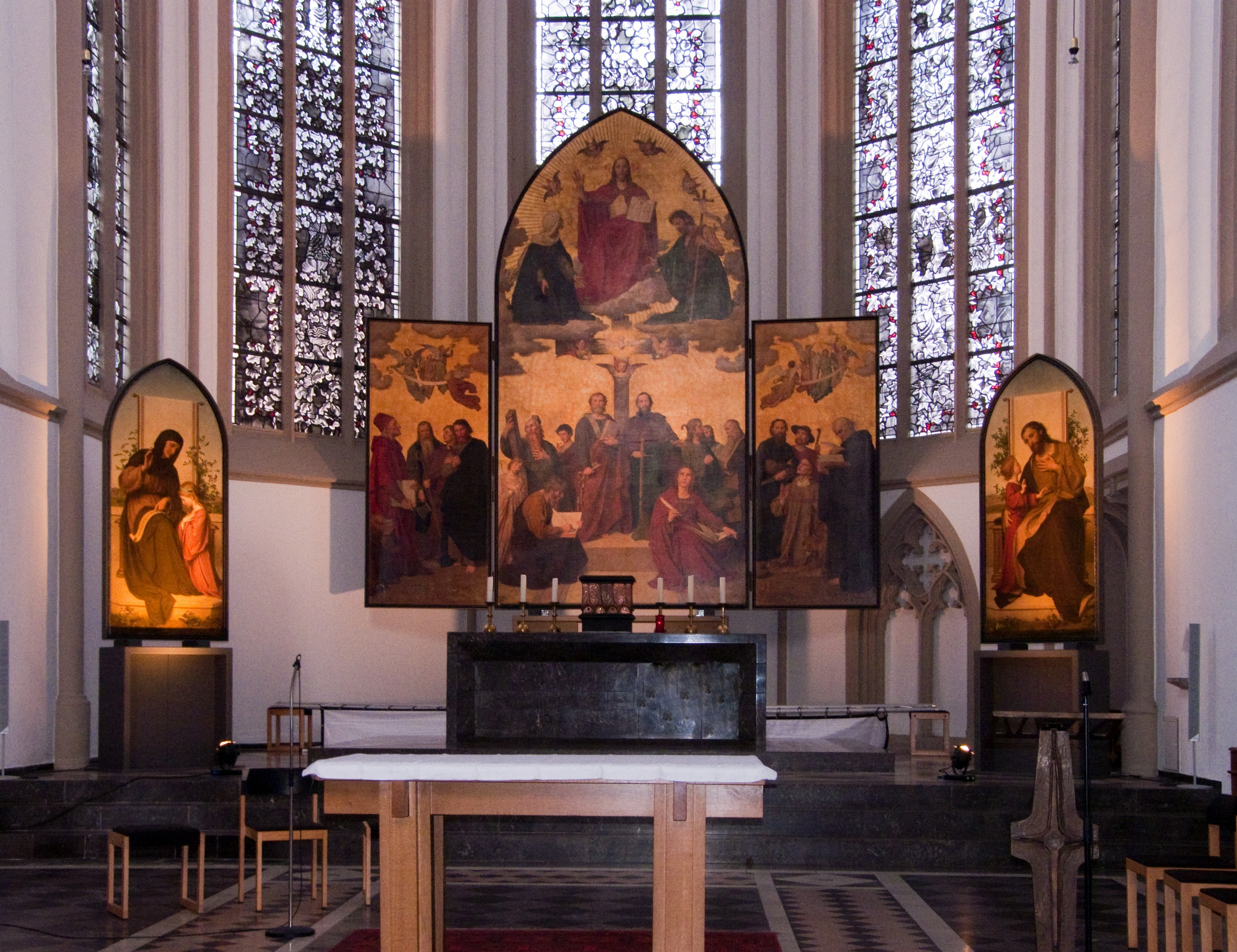
Altarpieces in St. Remigius, Bonn – left: Anna mit Maria, 1882 – right: Josef mit dem Jesusknaben, 1882

Müller mainly created religious paintings in the late Nazarene style. Many of his paintings became known through engravings and photographic reproductions. In addition, Müller was active as a portrait painter.

- Mädchenkopf, 1835
- Der auferstandene Christus in seiner Jünger Mitte, watercolour, 1837
- Christus mit seinen Jüngern im Ährenfelde, watercolour, 1837
- Tobias mit dem Engel, 1838
- Bildnis der Schwester Friederike, Erinnerungsbild um 1838
- Caritas, 1839
- Verkündigung, Sepiazeichnung nach Fra Angelico (Kloster San Marco, Florenz), Museum Kunstpalast
- various Andachtsbilder for the Verein zur Verbreitung religiöser Bilder, from 1841. (for instance Die Hl. Familie bei der Arbeit, Die Hl. Familie auf der Rast, Immaculata conceptio, Mutter des Erlösers, Jungfrau Maria).
- together with Ernst Deger, Franz Ittenbach and Andreas Müller: Ausmalung der Apollinariskirche, Remagen, 1844–1853 (Fresken: Krönung Mariae, Geburt Mariae and Die vorbildlichen Frauen, Die Verkündigung, Apokalyptisches Lamm)
- Madonna mit dem Kinde, inmitten der Heiligen Heinrich und Hedwig, 1854 for the Prince Bishop Heinrich Förster
- Maria und Elisabeth, 1859 von Heinrich Förster erworben
- Bewachsene Burgruine, Aquarell über Bleistiftzeichnung, Darmstadt 1861
- Heilige Familie, Kreidezeichnung, 1872, Metropolitan Museum of Art, New York.
- Madonna vor der Grotte, 1876
- Josef mit dem Jesusknaben, Altarpiece for St. Remigius, Bonn, 1882
- Anna mit Maria, Altarpiece for St. Remigius, Bonn, 1882
