= Ernst Deger =

German religious artist (1809-1885)

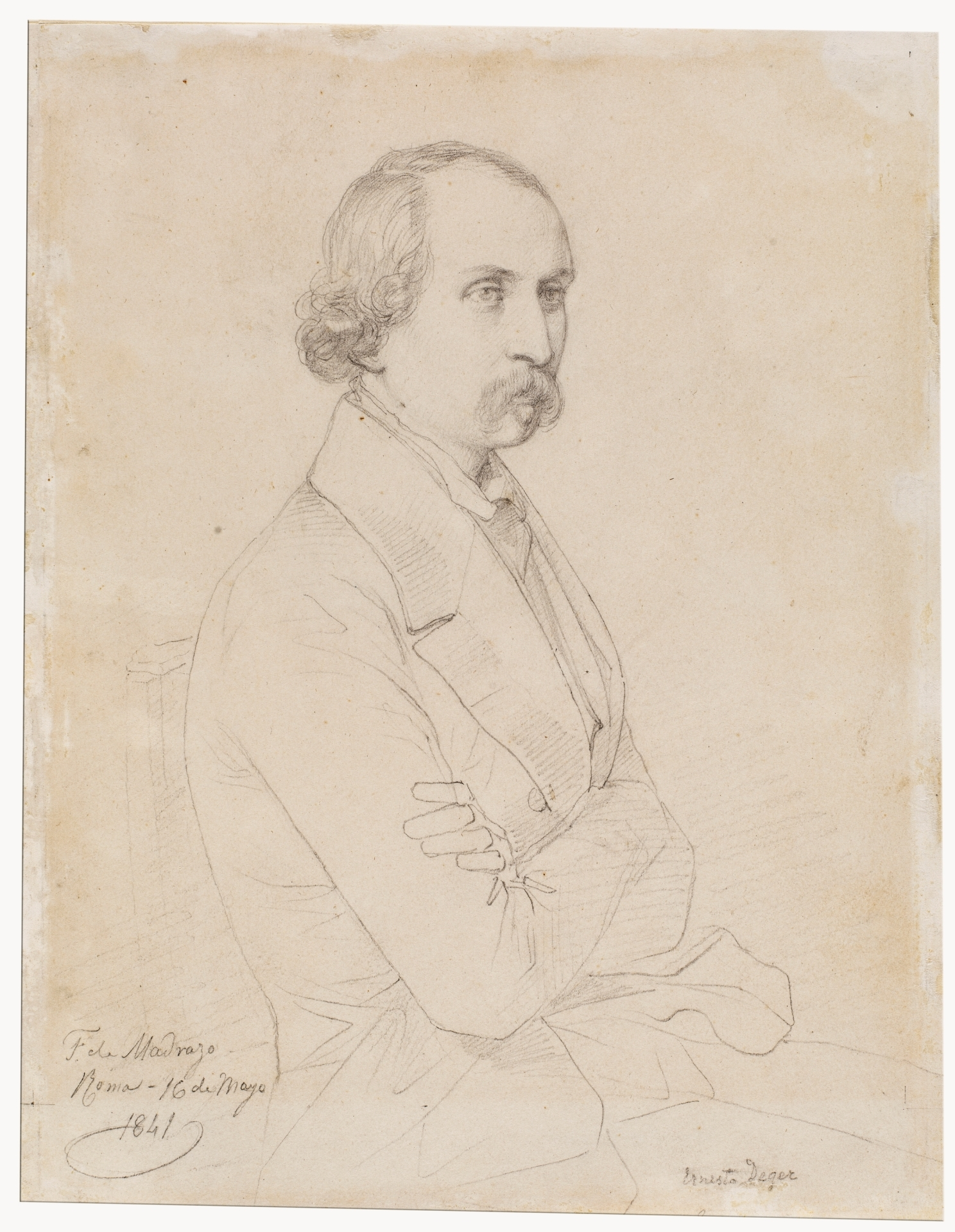
Ernst Deger; sketch by Federico de Madrazo (1841)

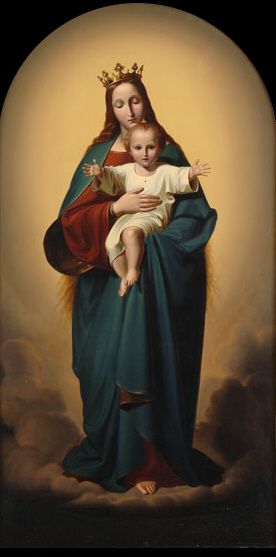
Mary as the Queen of Heaven

Ernst Deger (15 April 1809 – 27 January 1885) was a German religious artist, in the style of the Nazarene movement. He is considered to be the main representative of Christian art in the Düsseldorfer Malerschule.

== Life and work ==
He was born in Bockenem. He began his studies in 1828, at the Berlin Art Academy, then moved to the Kunstakademie Düsseldorf, where he studied with Wilhelm von Schadow. From 1834 to 1835, he was a student in the Master Class. On behalf of the Kunstverein für die Rheinlande und Westfalen (Artists' Association), he created an altarpiece for the Church of St. Andreas, showing Mary as the Queen of Heaven. Following its unveiling in 1837, it became one of the region's most popular religious images and found its way into numerous Catholic prayer books as a small andachtsbilder (devotional image). A notable feature is its depiction of Jesus as a toddler, rather than an infant.

From 1837 to 1842, he travelled through Italy. After his return, on behalf of Count Franz Egon von Fürstenberg-Stammheim, he worked with Karl Müller, Andreas Müller and Franz Ittenbach, creating frescoes of scenes from the life of Christ at the Apollinariskirche, Remagen. This project kept him occupied until 1851.

His next major project, commissioned by King Frederick William IV of Prussia, involved a series of wall paintings at Stolzenfels Castle. During its final phases, he was assisted by Peter Molitor, a struggling young artist from Koblenz. This has come to be considered his most important work.

In 1860, he began teaching at his alma mater, the Kunstakademie. He was appointed Professor of religious history painting in 1869. His best-known students included Franz Paul Massau and Friedrich Stummel. Many of his works have been widely distributed through reproductions.

Deger died in 1885, in Düsseldorf.

== Biblical scenes represented ==
- Adam and Eve in the Garden of Eden
- Fall
- Cain slams Abel
- Sacrifice of Isaac
- King David
- Annunciation of Mary
- Worshipping the Child
- Crucifixion
- Resurrection of Christ
- Ascension of Christ
- Outpouring of the Holy Spirit

== Sources ==
- Friedrich Noack, "Deger, Ernst", In: Allgemeines Lexikon der Bildenden Künstler von der Antike bis zur Gegenwart, Vol. 8: Coutan–Delattre, E. A. Seemann, Leipzig 1912 (Online)
- Eduard Daelen (1903). "Deger, Ernst" . Allgemeine Deutsche Biographie (in German). Vol. 47. Leipzig: Duncker & Humblot. pp. 641–642.
- Stadt Bockenem, Ausstellung zum 100. Todestag des Historienmalers Ernst Deger. Kultur- und Fremdenverkehrsamt, Bockenem 1985
- Anne Schiffer: Die malerische Ausstattung der Schlosskapelle von Stolzenfels durch Ernst Deger. Ein Beitrag zur Kunstgeschichte des 19. Jahrhunderts. Lang, Frankfurt am Main, 1992, ISBN 3-631-45200-4
