= Hasan Mohammed Jinnah =

State public prosecutor of Tamil Nadu, India

Hasan Mohamed Jinnah (born 1977) is an Indian lawyer, human rights activist, and author. He is the former Tamil Nadu State Public Prosecutor, having served in the role from 2021 to 2026. He is a criminal lawyer in South India and has served as a regional advisor to UNESCO CENTRE.

Jinnah practiced law at Madras High Court after graduating from Tamil Nadu Dr. Ambedkar Law University. He often takes up public interest litigation. Jinnah has frequently placed gender issues on the radar of human rights violations. The Sarika Shah case was an important moment in his career. It involved an incident of eve-teasing at Ethiraj College and set a precedent for the Tamil Nadu Protection of Eve Teasing Act in 1999.

== Early life and education ==
Hasan Mohamed Jinnah was born in Atthikadai, Thiruvarur district in 1977. He completed his schooling in Thiruvarur and Nagapattinam. In 1999, he received his law degree from Tamil Nadu Dr. Ambedkar Law University and also completed his post-graduation in law.

Jinnah is known for his public interest legal lawsuits that for the youth's cause. He filed a Public Interest Litigation in the same year he started his professional career as a lawyer, demanding the reinstallation of the Kannagi statue at the same location from which it was dethroned, at the Marina beach, Tamil Nadu. He successfully persuaded the Madras High Court to issue an interim order to place the statue in safe custody at the Government Museum in Chennai.

== Career ==
=== Early legal practice ===
Hasan Mohammed Jinnah enrolled as an advocate in June 1999. He began his practice under his father, who was serving as Public Prosecutor and Government Pleader. At the age of 21, he appeared in several criminal cases, including murder trials, on behalf of the police prosecution. In 2000, he began practicing independently at the Madras High Court.

In 2001, he filed a Public Interest Litigation before the Madras High Court seeking the reinstallation of the Kannagi statue at Marina Beach. The statue was put in the custody of the Government Museum and later reinstalled at the beach in 2006.

=== Public appointment ===
From 2006 to 2009, Jinnah served as Government Advocate (Criminal Side) in the Madras High Court. In 2009, he was appointed as Additional Public Prosecutor. He also served as Standing Counsel for the Chennai Metropolitan Development Authority (CMDA) and the Tamil Nadu Waqf Board. In the CMDA matters, he worked alongside senior law officers, including the then Additional Advocate General.

In 2004, he participated in the American Council of Young Political Leaders delegation to the United States. During the visit, he met with then U.S. Secretary of State Colin Powell and discussed India's candidature for permanent membership in the United Nations Security Council.

He later served as a member of the Central Board of Film Certification and was part of the regional board that reviewed the film Vishwaroopam. The certification process was conducted by a panel comprising members from multiple communities, as per the standard procedures of the board.

=== Tenure as State Public Prosecutor ===
In 2021, Jinnah was appointed as the State Public Prosecutor of Tamil Nadu. In this role, he introduced a system to communicate court orders from the High Court and Supreme Court to relevant authorities, and monitored compliance with judicial directions. He cleared backlogged files and implemented a process for issuing legal opinions within a one-week timeframe. Infrastructure upgrades were made to the offices in Chennai and Madurai during his tenure.

He advocated for maintaining cooperative engagement between the police and prosecutors, and for recognizing occupational stress experienced by law enforcement personnel. He also opposed the use of legal mechanisms for personal retaliation through improper FIRs and supported procedural integrity in criminal prosecutions.

In 2024, he held additional charge as Director of Prosecution in charge. During this period, pending promotion panels were finalized, vacant posts were addressed, and administrative delays in the Directorate were reduced.

=== Legal reforms ===
During his tenure as State Public Prosecutor, Hasan Mohammed Jinnah contributed to structural and procedural legal reforms. He proposed the separation of investigation and prosecution functions within the police force to enhance institutional clarity. He was involved in drafting the Tamil Nadu Model Prison Rules, 2024, aimed at standardizing prison administration practices. In 2024, he submitted a draft policy before the Madras High Court for the inclusion of transgender and gender-diverse persons in state welfare, education, and public employment, which the court acknowledged and directed the government to finalise within three months. In relation to the safety of female athletes, Jinnah submitted interim guidelines to the Madurai Bench of the Madras High Court, which appreciated the state's intention to introduce legislation for protecting women in sports. The Court recorded appreciation of both the Chief Secretary and Jinnah, and posted the matter for further orders.

In the Kaniyamoor arson case, Jinnah informed the Madras High Court that the investigation was progressing systematically, with 56 arrests and digital evidence being analysed. He also submitted status reports from the CB-CID and School Education Department. In 2023, he issued a recommendation suggesting that FIRs under Section 498A IPC include only the husband's name unless others were specifically implicated. He advised that public prosecutors treat police personnel with dignity and professionalism, citing concerns about disrespectful conduct. Circulars were issued to ensure humane treatment, emphasising that flaws in investigation should not result in mistreatment. In 2025, he reiterated that prosecutors should avoid summoning police unnecessarily and instead use electronic communication or video conferencing. He also suggested appointing designated officers in district units to handle digital case documentation and interaction.

In 2025, Jinnah appeared before the Madras High Court in connection with the Karur Velusamypuram stampede incident during actor-politician Vijay’s roadshow. Representing the State government, he informed the Court that an FIR had been registered and five individuals, including senior party officials, were named and arrested. He stated that investigations were progressing and that the government was not shielding any party members.

== Notable cases ==
- Kannagi Statue PIL (2001): Filed a Public Interest Litigation in the Madras High Court seeking reinstallation of the Kannagi statue on Marina Beach after it was removed by the state government.
- Qatari Death Row Case (2010): Provided legal assistance in drafting petitions and representation concerning Indian nationals facing death sentences in Qatar.
- Eve-Teasing PIL (1999): Filed a PIL advocating for stricter legal response to eve-teasing, referencing the Sarika Shah case. The initiative contributed to the enactment of specific state laws against harassment.
- Property Subletting Regulation: Raised concerns on unauthorized subletting, prompting FIR registration orders and a public awareness campaign led by the DGP.
- Transgender Policy Draft (2024): As State Public Prosecutor, submitted a draft policy to the Madras High Court for the inclusion of transgender and gender-diverse individuals in education, employment, and welfare schemes.
- Sexual Harassment Guidelines in Sports (2025): Represented the government in a case concerning athlete safety. The court acknowledged his role in presenting interim guidelines to prevent harassment of women athletes.
- FIR Reform in Dowry Cases (2023): Wrote to the DGP of Tamil Nadu, suggesting that only the husband's name be included in FIRs under Section 498A, unless there is direct evidence against relatives.
- Shivashankar Baba Case (2022): Argued for the recall of a quashing order in a child sexual abuse case. The court reinstated the FIR following his submissions on procedural lapses and lack of victim representation.
- POCSO & Minor Rape Cases (2023–2025): Represented the State in high-profile child sexual abuse cases, including one where the death penalty was reduced to life imprisonment by the Madras High Court.
- Karur Stampede Case (2025): Appeared before the Madras High Court representing the State government following the death of 41 persons during a political roadshow, and confirmed arrests in connection with the case.
