= Apolinar =

Apolinar is a masculine given name which may refer to:

- Apolinar de Jesús Soto Quesada (1827–1911), Bolivian politician
- Apolinar Serrano (1833–1876), Spanish bishop of Havana
- Apolinar Velez (1865–1939), Filipino politician

== See also ==
- Apolinar's wren, endemic to the Andean regions of Colombia
- Apollinaris (disambiguation)
