= Appolinaire Djikeng =

Cameroonian biologist

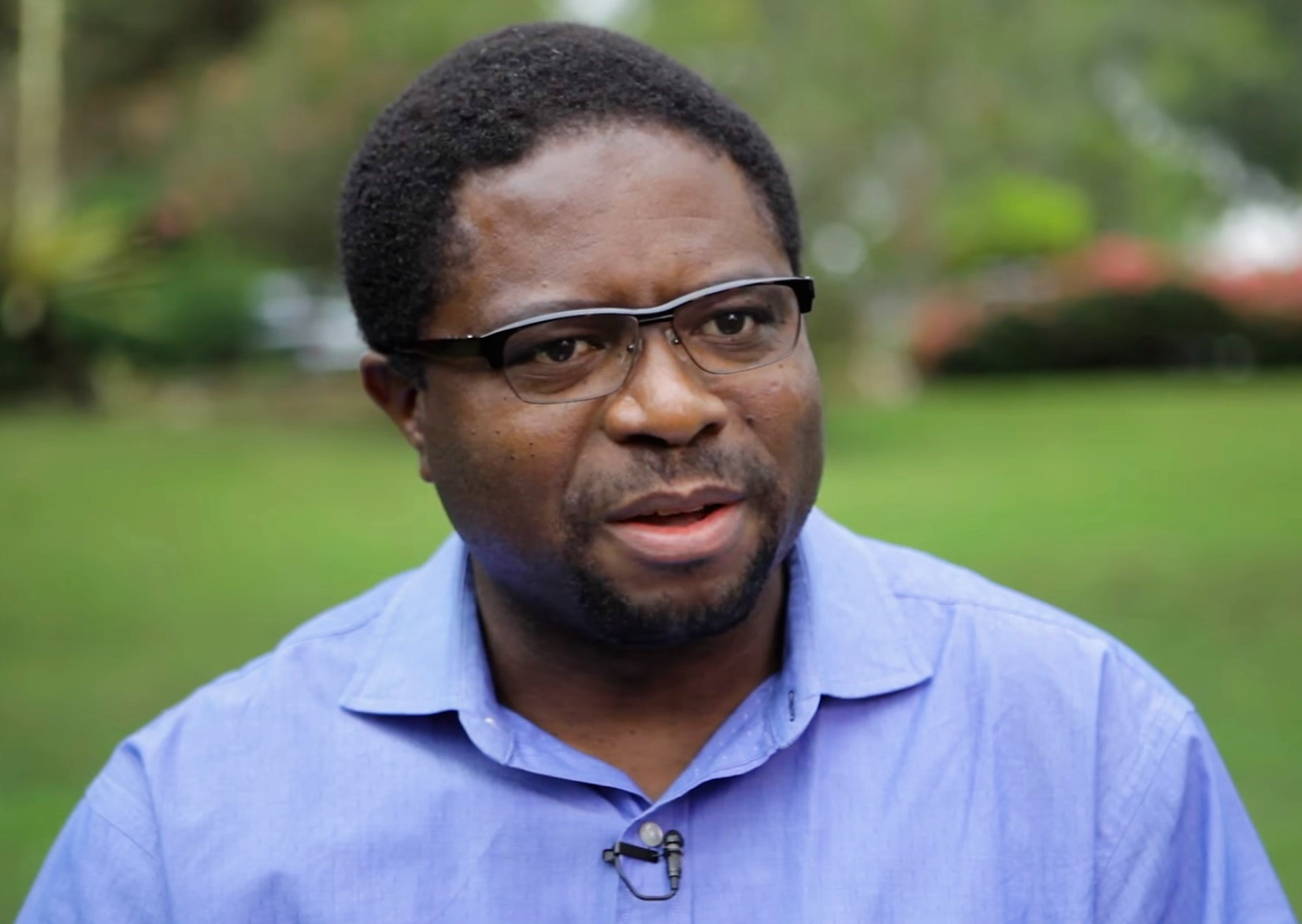
- Djikeng speaks for the International Livestock Research Institute in 2016
- Born: Cameroon
- Education: University of Yaoundé I Brunel University London
- Scientific career
- Workplaces: University of Edinburgh; Roslin Institute; Yale University

Appolinaire Djikeng is a Cameroonian biologist and Professor and Chair for Tropical Agriculture and Sustainable Development and Director of the Tropical Livestock Genetics and Health at the University of Edinburgh. He was awarded the 2020 UNESCO Center for Peace Nelson Mandela Justice award in recognition of his international peace work.

== Early life and education ==
Djikeng is from Cameroon. He earned his bachelor's and master's degrees in biology at the University of Yaoundé I. Djikeng earned his doctoral degree at Brunel University London where he studied the genome of Trypanosoma brucei. After earning his doctorate, in 1999 Djikeng moved to the United States. Here he joined Yale University where he worked in the J. Craig Venter Institute on gene expression, next generation sequencing and RNA interference. While working at Yale University, Djikeng started volunteering for the UNESCO Center for Peace.

== Research and career ==
In 2009 Djikeng moved to the International Livestock Research Institute in Nairobi, where he helped to establish the Biosciences eastern and central Africa (BecA) initiative. In 2013 he was appointed Director of BecA. In this capacity Djikeng was responsible for building research capabilities of biosciences research teams across Africa. He oversaw the formation of novel partnerships, including identifying new donors, university collaborators and programmes in developing countries. At BecA he specialised in livestock genetics and animal health.

In 2017 Djikeng joined the Roslin Institute at the University of Edinburgh, where he works as a livestock genomic scientist. He looks to create sustainable solutions to improve the productivity, sustainability and resilience of livestock in low-income countries. He was made Director of the Centre for Tropical Livestock Genetics and Health (CTLGH). Here he works on livestock that are resistant to disease, such that farming can be healthier and more productive. On 19 January 2023, he was appointed the Director General of ILRI and CGIAR Senior Director of Livestock-Based Systems.

He was awarded the 2020 UNESCO Center for Peace Nelson Mandela Justice award in recognition of his international peace work. The award was signed by Chris Van Hollen, and during his presentation, Djikeng outlined how the CTLGH contributes to the Sustainable Development Goals.

== Select publications ==
- Berriman, Matthew; Ghedin, Elodie; Hertz-Fowler, Christiane; Blandin, Gaëlle; Renauld, Hubert; Bartholomeu, Daniella C.; Lennard, Nicola J.; Caler, Elisabet; Hamlin, Nancy E.; Haas, Brian; Böhme, Ulrike (15 July 2005). "The Genome of the African Trypanosome Trypanosoma brucei". Science. 309 (5733): 416–422. Bibcode:2005Sci...309..416B. doi:10.1126/science.1112642. ISSN 0036-8075. PMID 16020726. S2CID 18649858.
- Berriman, Matthew; Haas, Brian J.; LoVerde, Philip T.; Wilson, R. Alan; Dillon, Gary P.; Cerqueira, Gustavo C.; Mashiyama, Susan T.; Al-Lazikani, Bissan; Andrade, Luiza F.; Ashton, Peter D.; Aslett, Martin A. (2009). "The genome of the blood fluke Schistosoma mansoni". Nature. 460 (7253): 352–358. Bibcode:2009Natur.460..352B. doi:10.1038/nature08160. ISSN 1476-4687. PMC 2756445. PMID 19606141.
- El-Sayed, Najib M.; Myler, Peter J.; Blandin, Gaëlle; Berriman, Matthew; Crabtree, Jonathan; Aggarwal, Gautam; Caler, Elisabet; Renauld, Hubert; Worthey, Elizabeth A.; Hertz-Fowler, Christiane; Ghedin, Elodie (15 July 2005). "Comparative Genomics of Trypanosomatid Parasitic Protozoa". Science. 309 (5733): 404–409. Bibcode:2005Sci...309..404E. doi:10.1126/science.1112181. ISSN 0036-8075. PMID 16020724. S2CID 2403838.
- Djikeng, A.; Shi, H.; Tschudi, C.; Ullu, E. (1 November 2001). "RNA interference in Trypanosoma brucei: cloning of small interfering RNAs provides evidence for retroposon-derived 24-26-nucleotide RNAs". RNA. 7 (11): 1522–1530. ISSN 1355-8382. PMC 1370195. PMID 11720282.
