= Peter Molitor =

German painter (1821–1898)

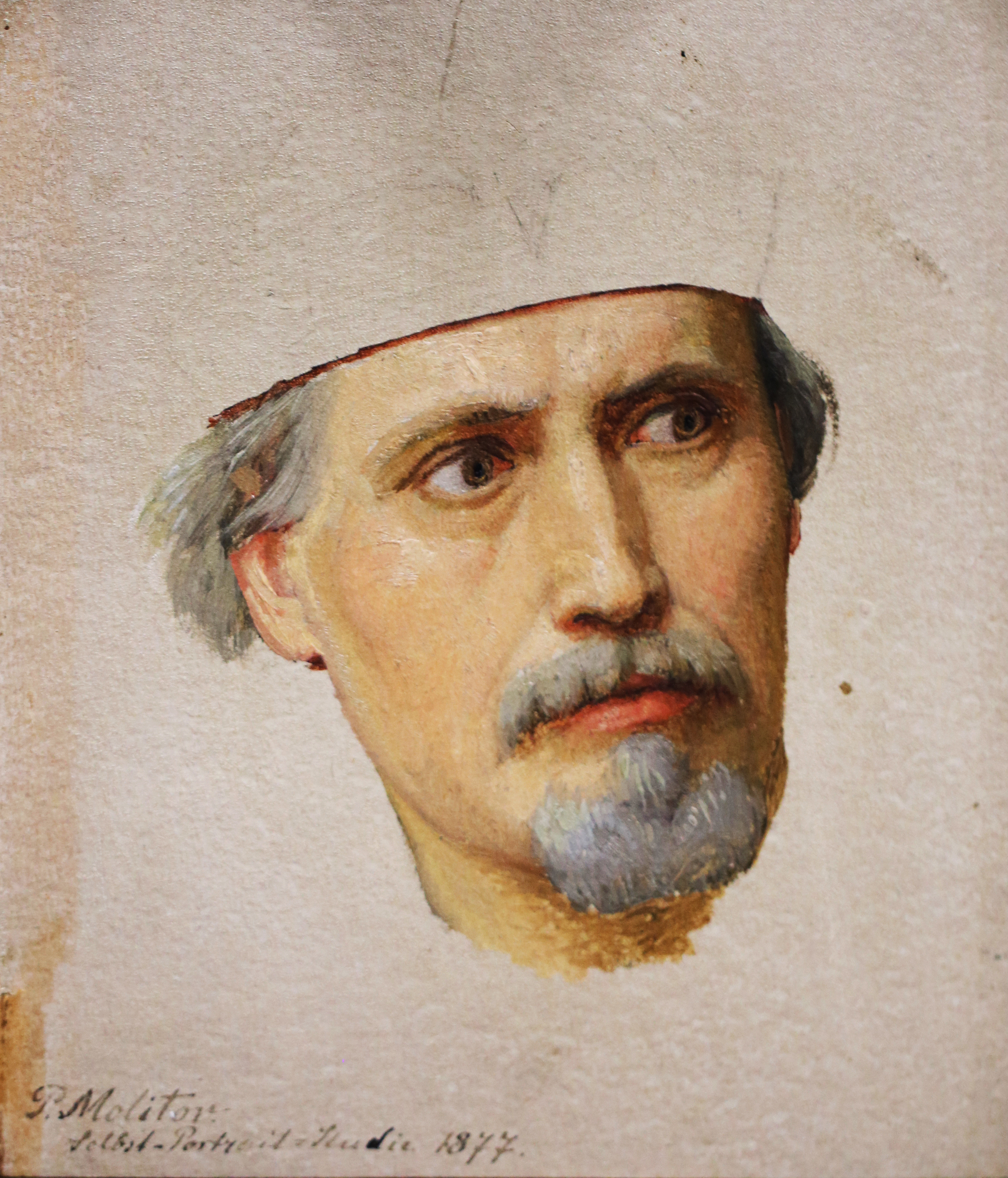
Self-portrait (1877)

Peter Joseph Molitor (19 September 1821 in Koblenz – 15 May 1898 in Oberlahnstein) was a German painter, associated with the Düsseldorfer Malerschule.

== Life and work ==
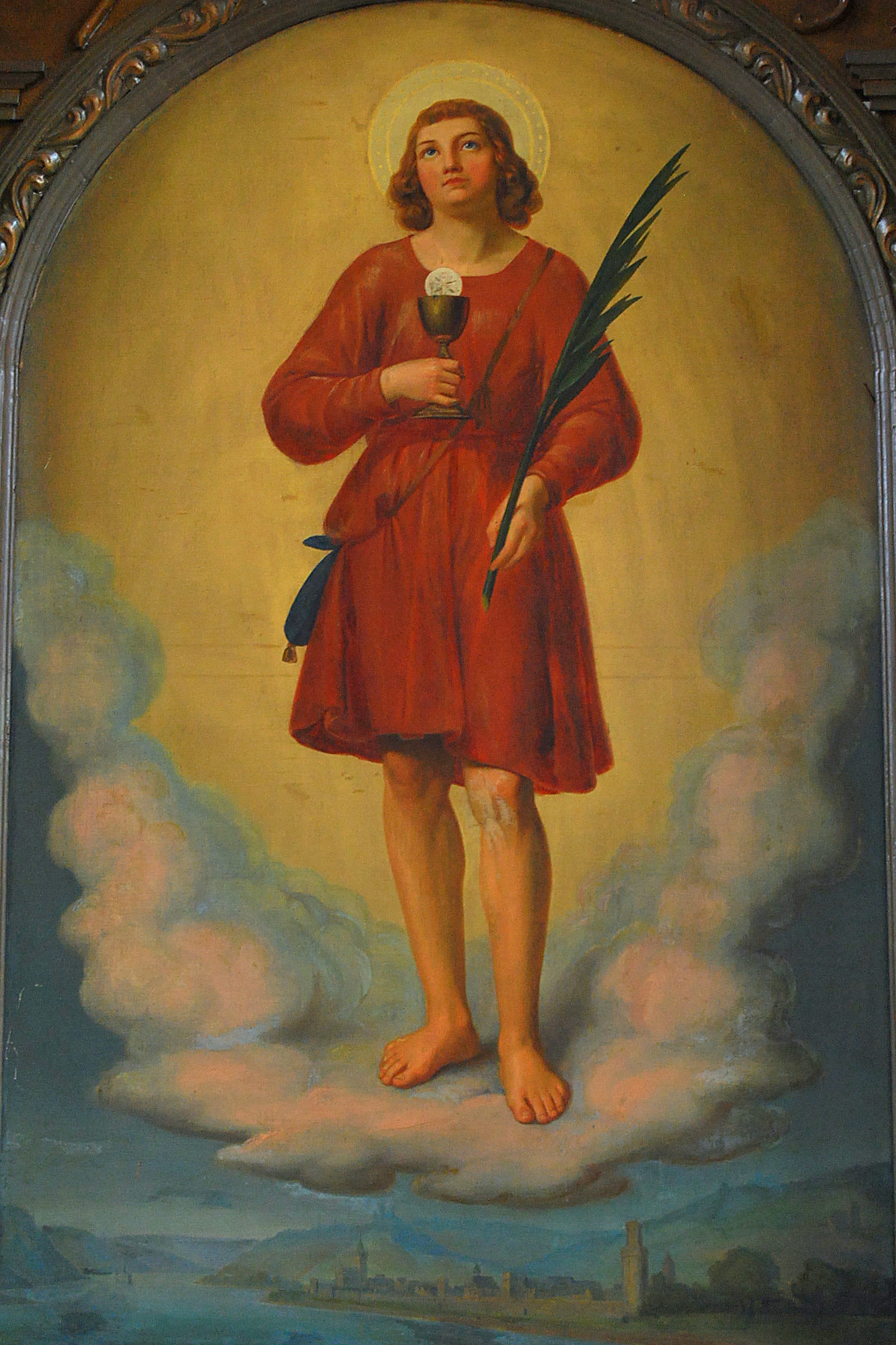
"The Boy Werner"

He was the son of Peter Ferdinand Marcus Molitor (1772–1838), a baker, originally from Meudt, and his wife, Maria Anna née Aleff. His father also served on the Koblenz city council. It is likely that he displayed artistic talent at an early age and received lessons from private tutors. At that time, Koblenz lacked a fine arts academy, so when he had become relatively proficient at the age of sixteen, he left home to continue his training at the Kunstakademie Düsseldorf, under the direction of Friedrich Wilhelm von Schadow.

He was there for less than a year when his studies were interrupted. His parents died within a few months of each other, so he had to return home to attend to the family's business. He was able to return to the Akademie in 1841 and studied portrait painting with Karl Ferdinand Sohn. He also developed an interest in history painting. His studies were completed in 1844, and his first known painting, depicting Werner of Oberwesel, dates from the following year. Except for a visit to Munich, nothing is known of his whereabouts from then until he returned to Koblenz around 1850.

In 1851, thanks to the religious artist Ernst Deger, he was able to get work assisting Alfred Rethel, a fellow student from the Akademie, with a project at the Aachen Town Hall, which had been started in 1847 but was delayed due to Rethel's poor health. Back in Koblenz, in 1854, he married Amalia Schneider, daughter of the court carpenter, Jakob Franz Schneider. In 1857, with his wife and infant daughter, he accepted another job offer from Deger and moved to Kapellen (now part of Koblenz), where their son, Franz, was born. This project involved wall paintings commissioned by King Frederick William IV of Prussia for Stolzenfels Castle.

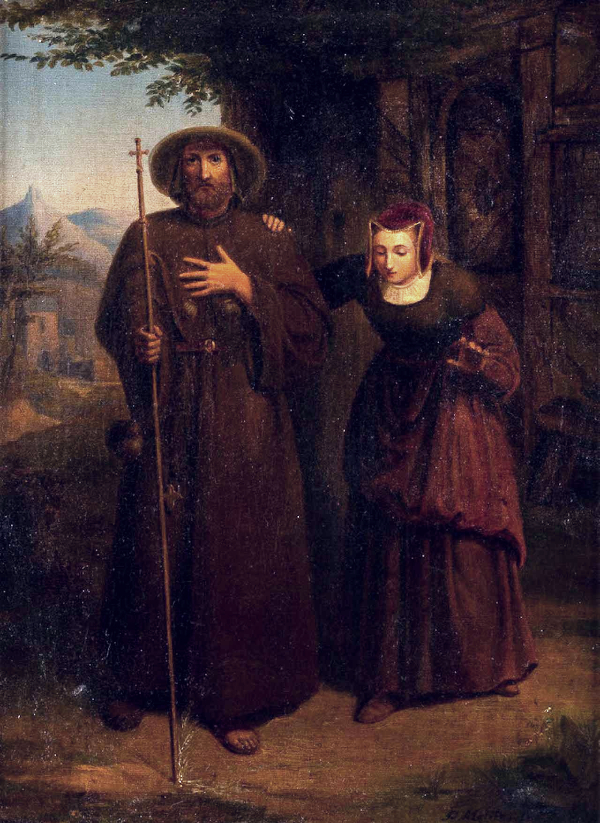
Cleric Leading a Blind Woman

After completing his work there, he returned to Düsseldorf with his young family, where their third child, a son, was born in 1860. That same year, he joined the progressive artists' association, Malkasten. Until 1882, he participated in the construction of the Church of Saint Nikolaus, commuting between Düsseldorf and Koblenz. The Passion Cycle, a series of ten large wall paintings, occupied him for six years. Some of the stained glass windows based on his drawings were destroyed in World War II.

In 1891, he resigned from Malkasten without stating a reason. From then until 1895, he was occupied with creating small format drawings on behalf of the Association for the Dissemination of Religious Images. The drawings were then turned into engravings by Josef Kohlschein, and reproduced for distribution.

In 1897, he sold his home in Düsseldorf and went to live with relatives in Oberlahnstein, near Lahneck Castle. Nine months later, he died of a stroke, aged seventy-six.
