= Apolinary =

Apolinary or Apollinary is a masculine given name. People who bear the name include:

- Apollinary Goravsky (1833–1900) was a Belarusian painter
- Apolinary Hartglas (1883–1953), Polish Jewish lawyer and Zionist activist
- Apolinary Kątski, birth name of Apollinaire de Kontski (1825–1879), Polish violinist, teacher and composer
- Apolinary Kotowicz (1859–1917), Polish painter
- Apolinary Szeluto (1884–1966), Polish pianist and composer
- Apollinary Vasnetsov (1856–1933), Russian painter
- Apolinary Wnukowski, Bishop of Płock from 1904 to 1908; see List of bishops of Płock

== See also ==
- Apollinaris (disambiguation)
