= Calderoni =

Calderoni is an Italian surname. Notable people with the surname include:

- Alex Calderoni (born 1976), Italian footballer
- Guillermo González Calderoni (1949–2003), Commander of the Mexican Federal Judicial Police
- Marco Calderoni (born 1989), Italian footballer
