= Saint-Apollinaire =

Saint-Apollinaire may refer to:

== Canada ==
- Saint-Apollinaire, Quebec, a municipality in Quebec

== France ==
- Saint-Apollinaire, Hautes-Alpes, a commune in the department of Hautes-Alpes
- Saint-Apollinaire, Côte-d'Or, a commune in the department of Côte-d'Or
- Saint-Apollinaire-de-Rias, a commune in the department of Ardèche

== See also ==
- Apollinaire (disambiguation)
