= Apollinarius (astrologer) =

First or second century AD astrologer

Apollinarius was a first or second century AD astrologer who wrote in Greek. He is a source for Vettius Valens and Galen.
