= Apollinarius (governor) =

Governor of Ibiza, Majorca and Menorca
- In office c. 534 CE – Unknown

Personal details
- Born: Unknown Italian Peninsula
- Died: Unknown Unknown

Apollinarius was a Byzantine governor of the Balearic Islands, appointed in 534. The main source about him is Procopius.

== Biography ==
Apollinarius was a native of the Italian Peninsula, but apparently settled in the Vandal Kingdom of North Africa while still underage. He grew up to serve King Hilderic (r. 523–530) and was reportedly rewarded "with great sums of money". When Hilderic was overthrown by Gelimer (r. 530–534), Apollinarius escaped to Constantinople. He and other political exiles asked Justinian I (r. 527–565) to intervene. Justinian soon started the Vandalic War.

Apollinarius served under Belisarius in the War and "proved himself a brave man". He took part in the Battle of Tricamarum (15 December, 533) and his contact earned him the favour of Belisarius. In 534, Apollinarius was rewarded with appointment as governor over the islands of Ibiza, Majorca and Menorca. His authority possibly extended over the rest of the Balearic Islands, but they are not named in primary sources. His subsequent activities are unknown.

== Sources ==
- Martindale, John R., ed. (1992). The Prosopography of the Later Roman Empire: Volume III, AD 527–641. Cambridge: Cambridge University Press. ISBN 0-521-20160-8.
- Procopius of Caesarea; Dewing, Henry Bronson (1914), History of the wars. vol. 2, Books III-IV, Cambridge University Press, ISBN 0-674-99054-4
