= Franz Ittenbach =

German painter

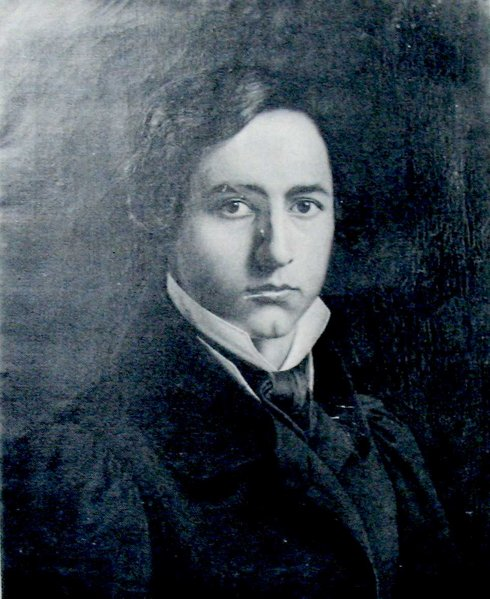
Self Portrait (1857)

Franz Ittenbach (18 April 1813 – 1 December 1879) was a German religious painter, in the Nazarene style, associated with the Düsseldorfer Malerschule.

== Life and work ==
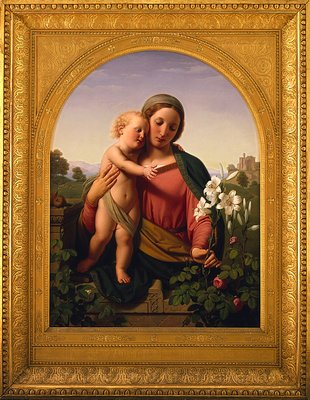
Madonna and Child (1855)

Ittenbach was born in Königswinter. He began his art education as a student of Kaufmann, then left to study under Franz Katz in Cologne. In 1832, Ittenbach became a pupil, at the age of 19, of the Düsseldorf Academy, where he also received private lessons from its president, Friedrich Wilhelm Schadow. He is associated with the Düsseldorf school of painting. He was a member of the Nazarene movement and associated himself mainly with three of his friends and fellow-students: Karl Müller and Andreas Müller, and Ernst Deger. The four men travelled about in Germany, studying and painting together. From 1839 to 1842, Ittenbach lived in Italy. On his return, he stayed in Munich for some time. In 1849, he returned to Düsseldorf. He died there in 1879. From 1859 until his death, he was a member of the artists' club "Malkasten".

Ittenbach was exceedingly religious and persistently declined any commissions for mythological or pagan subjects. As a rule, he devoted his energies exclusively to church decoration. He would precede the execution of his greatest works with devout religious exercises, including confession and communion.

His finest paintings are said to be found at Bonn, in the St. Remigius, and in Breslau in a church dedicated to the same saint. There is also a remarkable "Holy Family" dated 1861, painted for Prince Liechtenstein in his private chapel near Vienna. Most of his other works can be found in various Catholic churches in Germany. His only important fresco was painted in 1844 in a church at Remagen.

Ittenbach was a popular painter in court circles, a member of most of the European academies, and the recipient of many medals and decorations. He painted a few portraits, although his main work was his altar-pieces.
