= Apollinare Offredi =

Italian philosopher (15th century)

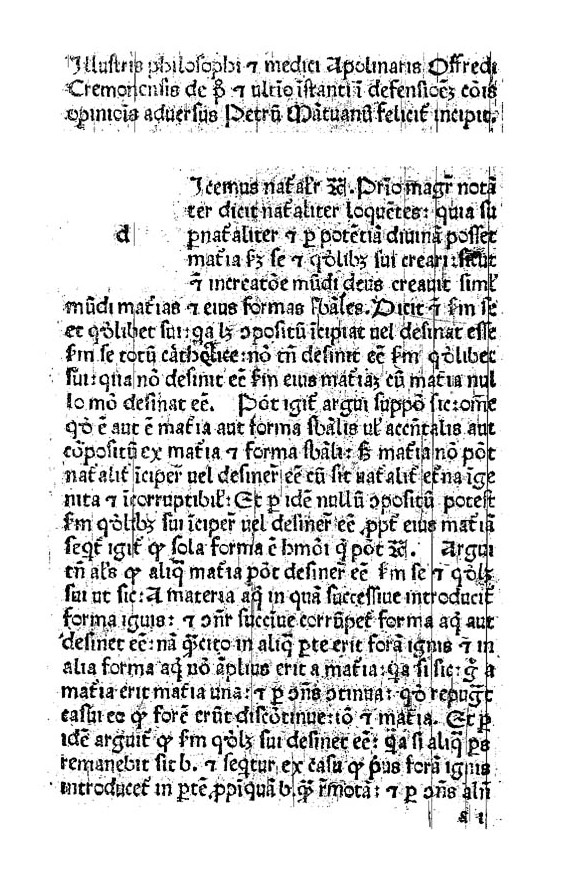
De primo et ultimo instanti in defensionem communis opinionis adversus Petrum Mantuanum, 1478

Giovan Pietro Apollinare Offredi was a 15th-century Italian philosopher.

== Works ==
- De primo et ultimo instanti in defensionem communis opinionis adversus Petrum Mantuanum (in Latin). Colle di Val d'Elsa: Bonus Gallus. 1478.
