= Apollinare Calderini =

Italian clergyman and writer (16th-17th century)

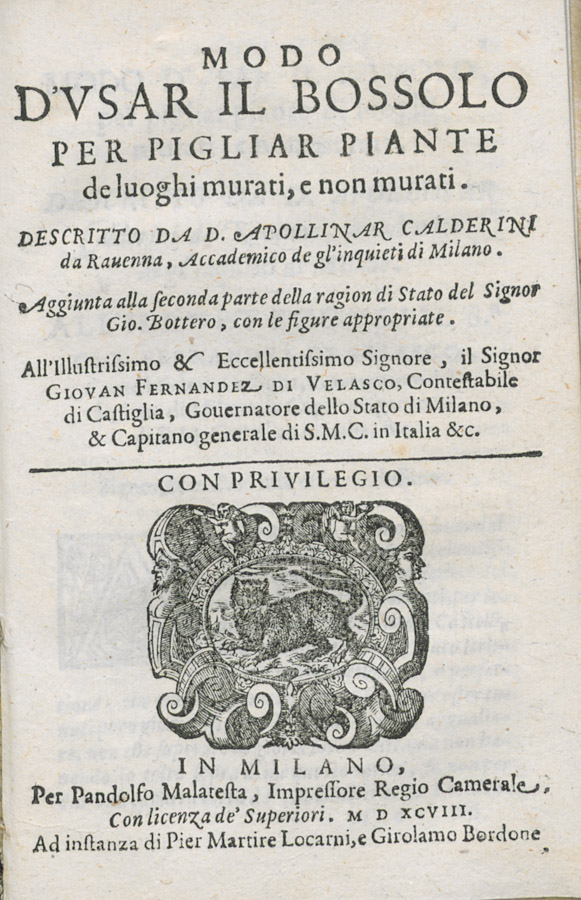
Modo d'usar il bossolo per pigliar piante de luoghi murati, e non murati (1598)

Apollinare Calderini (Ravenna, second half of the 16th century – first half of the 17th century) was an Italian Catholic clergyman and writer. Deeply devoted to ministry and preaching, he studied the work of the philosopher Giovanni Botero in depth.

== Biography ==
Little biographical information is available about Apollinare Calderini. It is known that he was born in Ravenna and, after receiving an initial humanistic education, he moved to Milan, where he began an ecclesiastical career by joining the Canons Regular of the Lateran.

In 1597, he published Discorsi sopra la Ragione di Stato del Signor Giovanni Botero ("Discourses on the Reason of State by Signor Giovanni Botero") in Milan, dedicating it to Ranuccio Farnese, Duke of Parma and Piacenza. The aim of the work was to disseminate and promote the treatise The Reason of State by the Jesuit philosopher Giovanni Botero. Clearly rooted in Baroque tradition, Calderini's work seeks to reconcile moral law with the utilitarian practices of politics.

He was a member of the Accademia degli Inquieti in Milan.

== Works ==
- Discorsi sopra la Ragione di Stato del Signor Giovanni Botero (in Italian). Milan: Pietro Martire Locarno. 1597.
- Modo d'usar il bossolo per pigliar piante de luoghi murati, e non murati (in Italian). Milan: Pandolfo Malatesta. 1598.
