= UNESCO Center for Peace =

The UNESCO Center for Peace is a non-profit organization founded in 2004 in Maryland USA. It promotes the ideals of the United Nations Educational, Scientific and Cultural Organization (UNESCO).

UNESCO Center for Peace is partner to Frederick County Public Schools, Hood College, Frederick Community College, Maryland School for the Deaf (MSD) on a variety of community projects that include various after school programs, Distinguished Speaker Series, Regional Model United Nations, International Model United Nations, Celebrations and Commemorations of major United Nations International Days, the Frederick Stamp Festival, National and International Exchange Programs for High School and College level students and schools. UNESCO Center for Peace is also the flagship bearer of the U.S. Federation of UNESCO Centers and Associations USFUCA) and the U.S. National Commission for UNESCO Clubs, Centers and Associations (USNCUC).
