= Franz Egon von Fürstenberg-Stammheim =

German aristocrat and politician

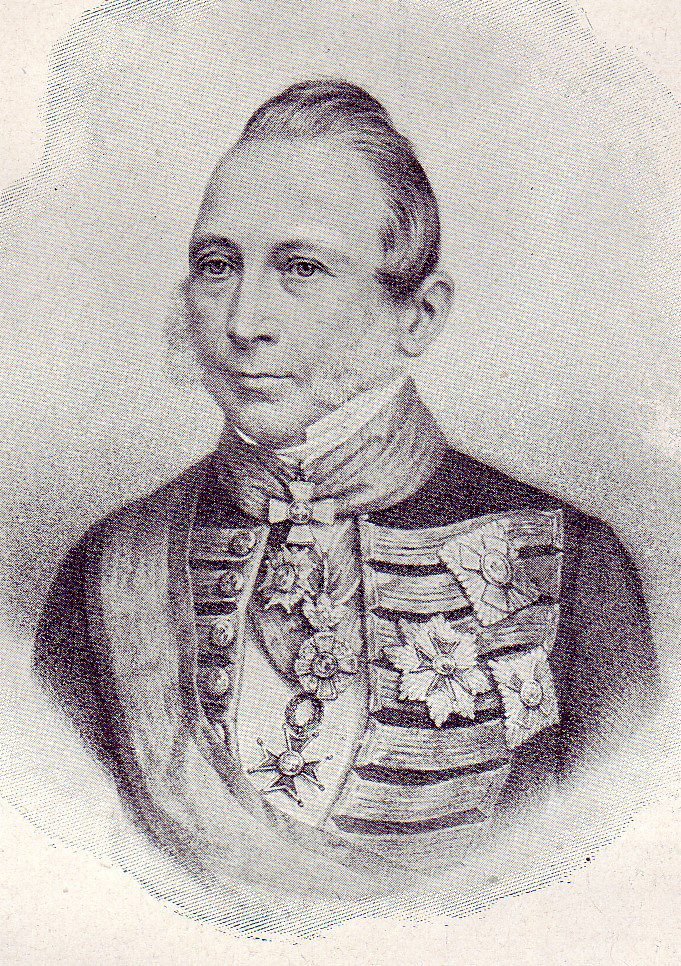
Franz Egon von Fürstenberg-Stammheim (1854)

Franz Egon Graf von Fürstenberg-Stammheim (24 March 1797 – 20 December 1859) was a German aristocrat, landowner and politician. He was a member of the House of Fürstenberg, a Westphalian noble family.

Franz Egon was an enthusiastic patron of art, who advocated the completion of Cologne Cathedral. He also erected the new church of St Apollinaris near Remagen on the Rhine. He was a member of the Prussian Upper House in 1849, collaborated in founding the Preußisches Wochenblatt newspaper, and was an ardent defender of Catholic interests.
