= Sant'Apollinare (disambiguation) =

Sant'Apollinare may refer to:

- Sant'Apollinare, a comune in the province of Frosinone, Italy
- Sant'Apollinare, a frazione of Rovigo, Italy
- Sant'Apollinare, a frazione of Arcevia, Italy
- Sant'Apollinare di Vito, a frazione of Reggio Calabria, Italy
- Sant'Apollinare, a frazione of San Vito Chietino, Italy
- Sant'Apollinare, an island of the Brissago Islands
- Basilica of Sant'Apollinare in Classe, a church in Ravenna
- Basilica of Sant'Apollinare Nuovo, a church in Ravenna
- Sant'Apollinare alle Terme Neroniane-Alessandrine, a church in Rome
