= Marco Calderini =

Italian painter

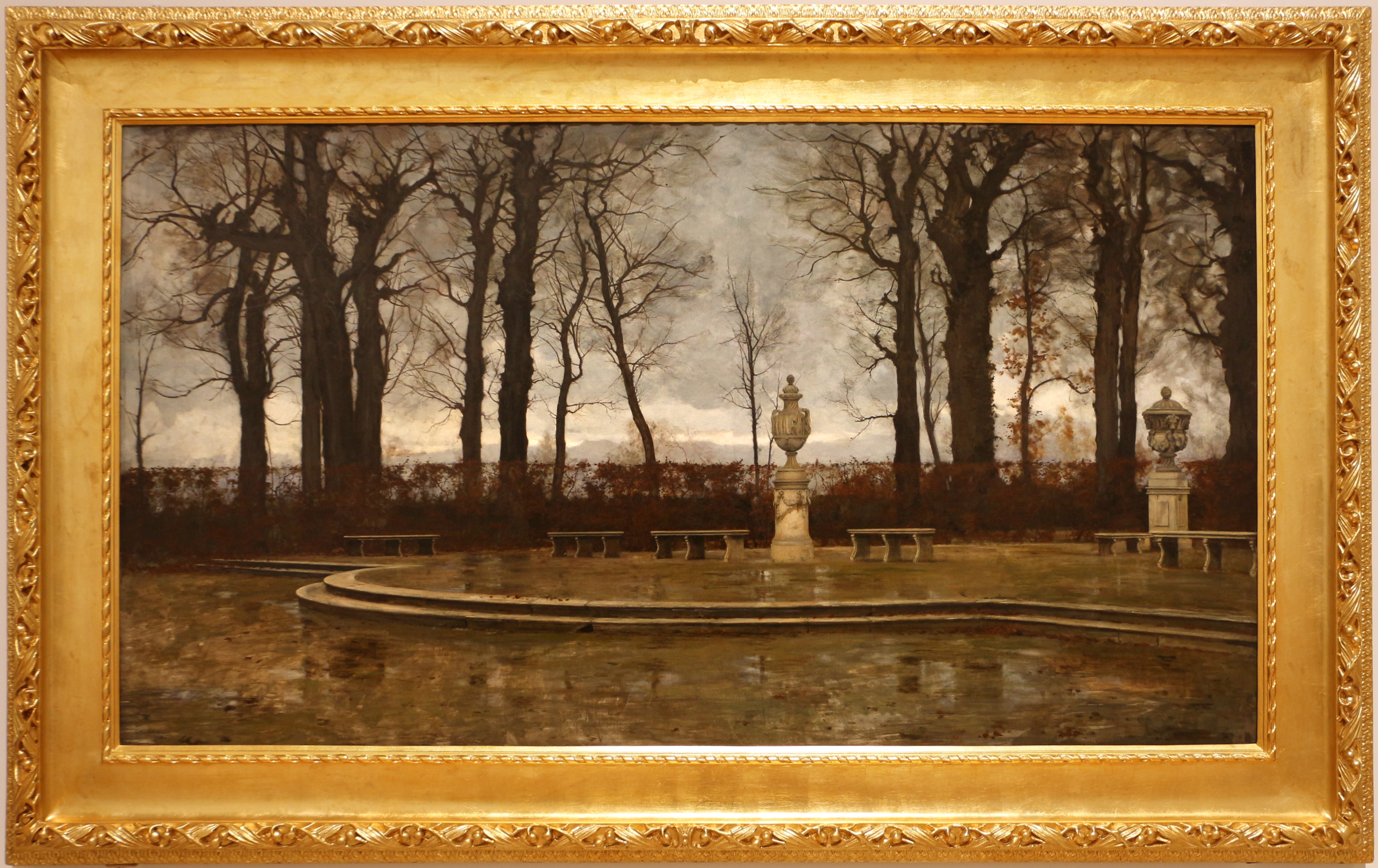
Tristezza invernale, 1884, Rome, GNAM

Marco Calderini (Turin, 20 July 1850 - Turin, 26 February 1941) was an Italian painter, mainly of land- and cityscapes (vedute) in a Romantic style.

He studied at the Accademia Albertina of Turin under Gamba, Gastaldi, and Fontanesi. He published a laudatory biography of Fontanesi. He exhibited routinely at the Promotrice of Turin from 1870 to 1928. He was a member of the Superior Council of Public Education. He wrote art criticisms and was a lithographer.
