= Apollinaris of Ravenna =

Syrian bishop and saint

Saint Apollinaris of Ravenna
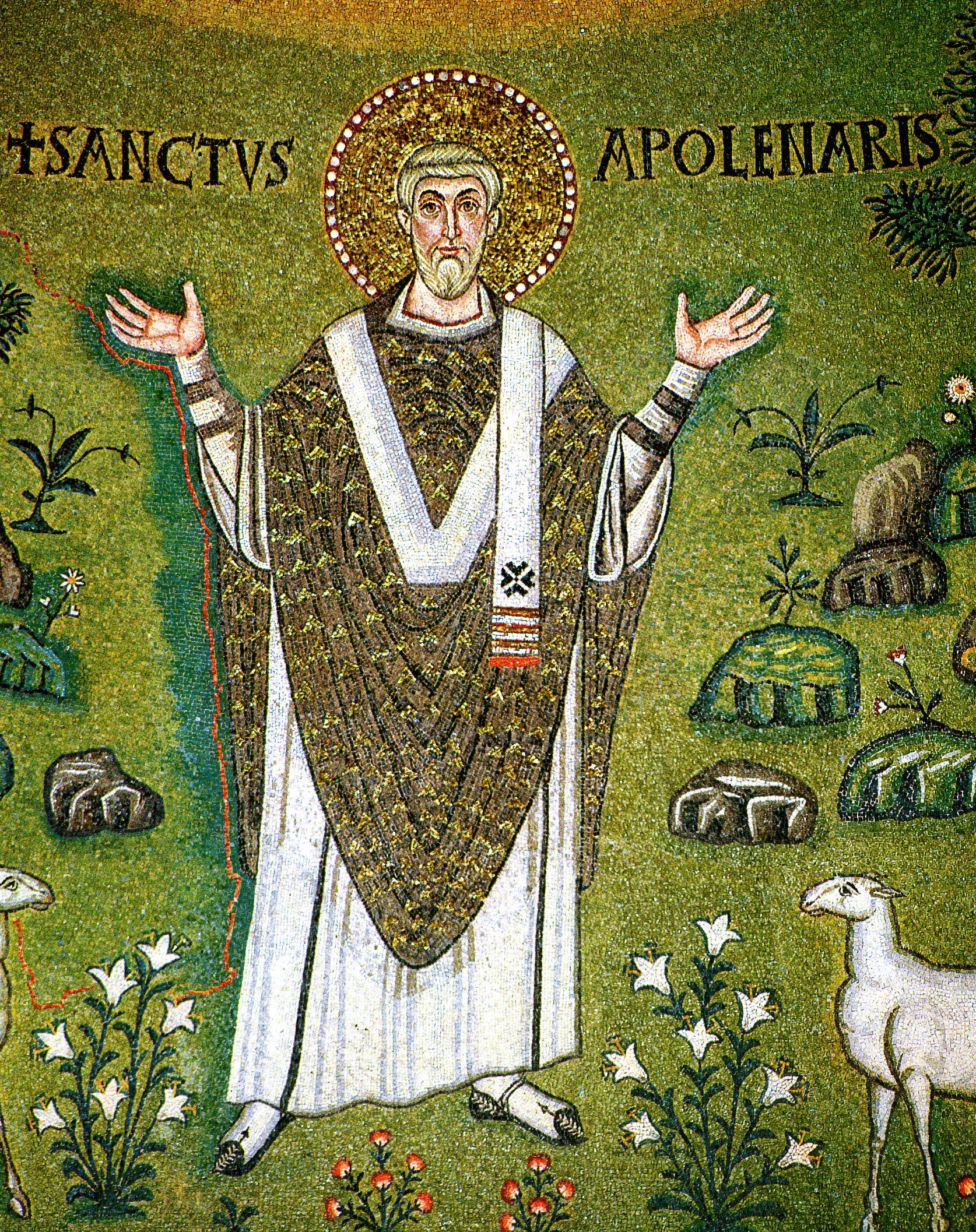
- Portrait Mosaic of Saint Apollinarisat the Basilica of Sant'Apollinare in Classe, Ravenna

Bishop of Ravenna, Hieromartyr
- Born: Antioch, Syria (now Antakya, modern-day Turkey)
- Died: Ravenna, Italy
- Venerated in: Eastern Orthodox Church; Roman Catholic Church
- Feast: 23 July (pre-1969 General Roman Calendars, Eastern Orthodox Church); 20 July (in Roman Rite of Catholic Church)
- Attributes: Sword
- Patronage: epilepsy; gout; Emilia-Romagna region (Italy); Aachen, Burtscheid, Düsseldorf, Ravenna, Remagen

Apollinaris of Ravenna (Italian: Apollinare; Greek: Ἀπολλινάριος, Apollinarios, Late Latin: Apolenaris) is a Syrian saint, whom the Roman Martyrology describes as "a bishop who, according to tradition, while spreading among the nations the unsearchable riches of Christ, led his flock as a good shepherd and honoured the Church of Classis near Ravenna by a glorious martyrdom."

== Biography ==
It is not certain what was his native place, though it was probably Antioch in the Roman province of Syria. It is not certain that he was one of the seventy-two disciples of Christ, as has been suggested, but he was apparently a disciple of Saint Peter, who may have consecrated and commissioned him as the first Bishop of Ravenna during the reign of the Emperor Claudius, the fourth Roman emperor from 41 to 54 A.D. The precise date of his consecration as Bishop cannot be ascertained. He dedicated himself to the work of evangelization in Emilia-Romagna. During his twenty-six year tenure as bishop of Ravenna, he faced nearly constant persecution.

Christian inscriptions dating from the 2nd century have been discovered near Classe, confirming the presence of Christianity in Ravenna at a very early date. According to the list of the bishops of Ravenna compiled by Bishop Marianus (546–556), the 12th Bishop of Ravenna was named Severus; and he is among those who signed at the Council of Sardica in 343. Thus, the epoch of Saint Apollinaris may be estimated as possibly to the last decades of the 2nd century, placing his martyrdom possibly under Emperor Septimius Severus.

The Passio Sancti Apollinaris presents historical difficulties. It was probably written by Archbishop Maurus of Ravenna (642–671), who presumably wanted to demonstrate the early origin of his see and a connection to Saint Peter, in an effort to achieve a degree of autonomy from Rome. (In 666 Emperor Constans II granted the request of Bishop Maurus, allowing Ravenna to consecrate its bishop without approval from Rome, and declared that the Pope had no jurisdiction over the Archbishop of Ravenna, since that city was the seat of the exarch, his immediate representative.)

== Traditional narrative ==
The miracles Apollinaris wrought soon attracted official attention, for they and his preaching won many converts to the Faith, while at the same time bringing upon him the fury of the idolaters, who beat him cruelly and drove him from the city. He was found half-dead on the seashore, and kept in concealment by the Christians, but was captured again and compelled to walk on burning coals and a second time expelled. But he remained in the vicinity, and continued his work of evangelization.

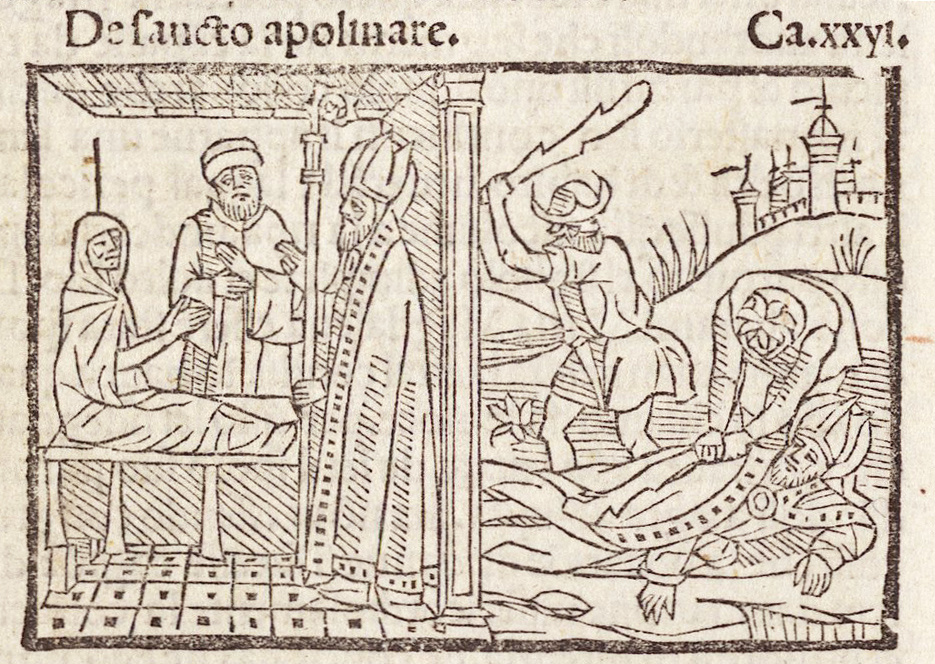
Apollinaris in the Golden Legend (1497)

He then journeyed to Aemilia. A third time he returned to Ravenna. Again he was captured, beaten and tortured, and flung into a dungeon, loaded with chains, to starve to death; but after four days he was put on board a ship and sent to Greece. There the same course of preachings, miracles, and sufferings continued; and when his very presence caused the oracles to be silent, he was, after a cruel beating, sent back to Italy.

All this continued for three years, and a fourth time he returned to Ravenna. By this time Vespasian was Emperor, and he, in answer to the complaints of the pagans, issued a decree of banishment against the Christians. Apollinaris was kept concealed for some time, but as he was passing out of the gates of the city, was set upon and savagely beaten, probably at Classis, a suburb, but he lived for seven days, foretelling meantime that the persecutions would increase, but that the Church would ultimately triumph.

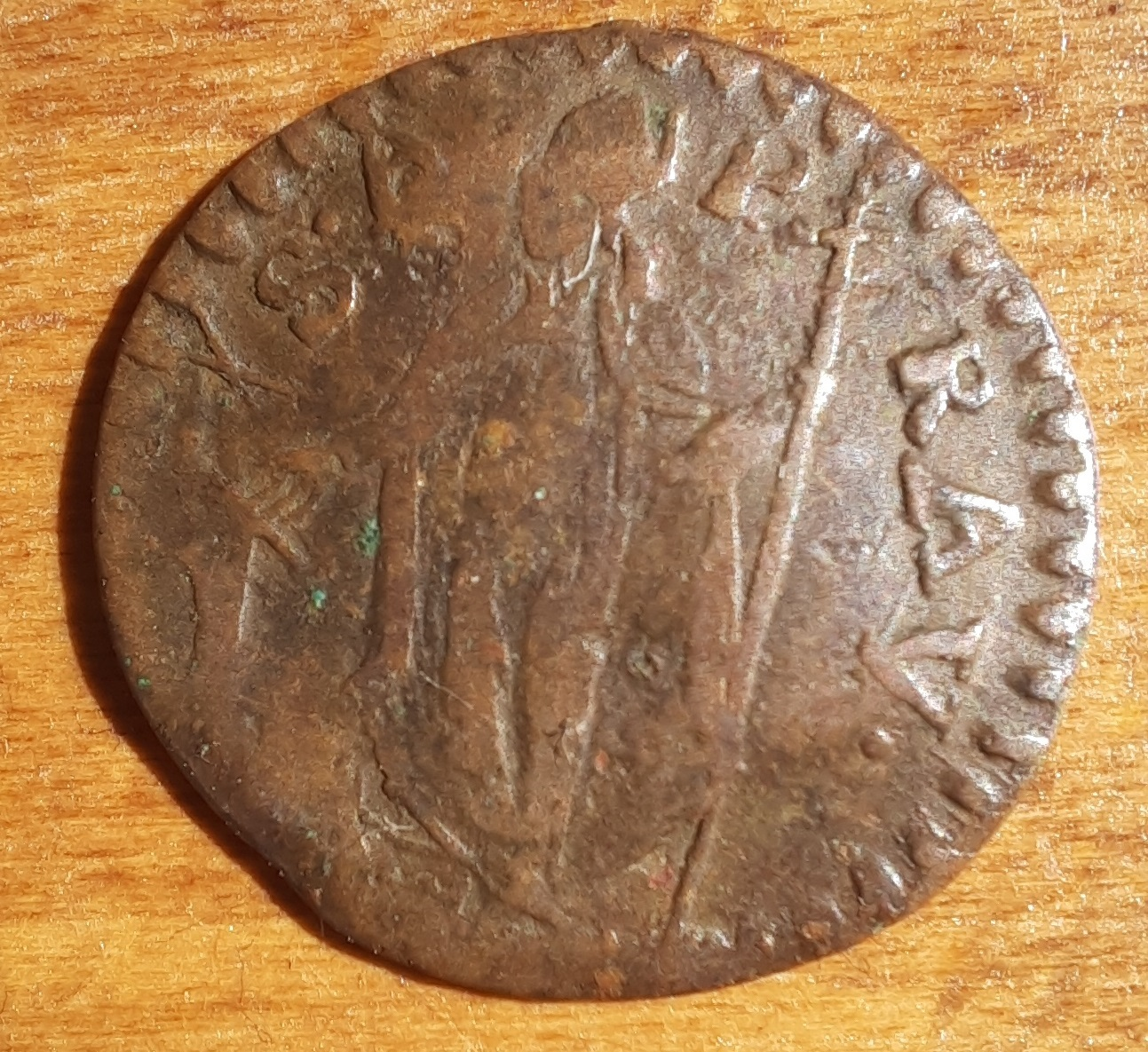
Apollinaris depicted on a quattrino from Ravenna

== Veneration ==
His movement quickly spread beyond the city limits. Popes Simmachus (498–514) and Honorius I (625–638) encouraged its spread to Rome, while the Frankish king Clovis dedicated a church to Apollinaris near Dijon. In Germany it probably spread thanks to the Benedictine and Camaldolese monasteries. A church was also dedicated to him in Bologna in the area of the Palazzo del Podestà, but was demolished in 1250.

=== Feast day ===
His memorial in the General Roman Calendar is 20 July. It was previously a lesser Double feast 23 July, the day he is believed to have been martyred. The liturgical celebration was removed by the decree of Mysterii Paschalis in 1969. 23 July in the current General Roman Calendar is the feast of Saint Bridget of Sweden, since it is also the day she died and she is now better known in the West than Saint Apollinaris, being one of the patron saints of Europe. in the 2002 edition of the Roman Missal, with the date of celebration changed to 20 July, the nearest day not taken up with other celebrations. The Roman Martyrology mentions Saint Apollinaris both on 20 July and also (Note: "At Classis, near Ravenna in Flaminia, the martyrdom of Saint Apollinaris, bishop, whose memorial is celebrated on 20 July.") on 23 July.

=== Relics ===
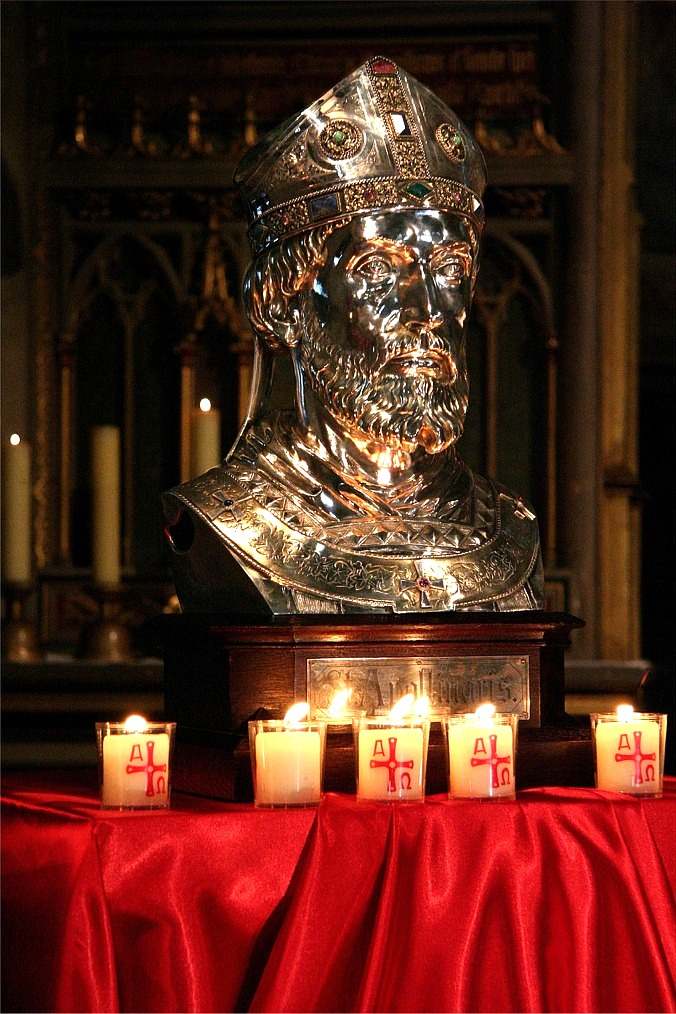
Reliquary of St Apollinaris in Remagen

His relics were held at the Basilica of Sant'Apollinare in Classe, on the traditional site of his martyrdom. In 856, they were transferred to the Basilica of Sant'Apollinare Nuovo in Ravenna because of the threat posed by frequent pirate raids along the Adriatic coast. There are also relics of Apollinaris at (St. Lambertus (Düsseldorf)). Additional relics are housed at the Apollinariskirche, Remagen.

There are churches dedicated to him in Aachen, and Burtscheid in Germany, where his veneration was probably spread by Benedictine monks. The Frankish king Clovis built a church dedicated to him in Dijon, and another dedicated to Saint Apollinaris also existed in Bologna, but was destroyed in 1250. Bořivoj II, Duke of Bohemia, founded a church with a collegiate chapter dedicated to Saint Apollinaris in Sadská (then an important centre of the Czech state) in 1117/1118. On behalf of Charles IV, Holy Roman Emperor, the chapter was later transferred from Sadská to recently founded New Town of Prague in 1362 and another church of St Apollinaris built there. Both of these churches in Bohemia stand to the present time. In 1957, a church venerating St. Apollinaris was founded in Napa, California.

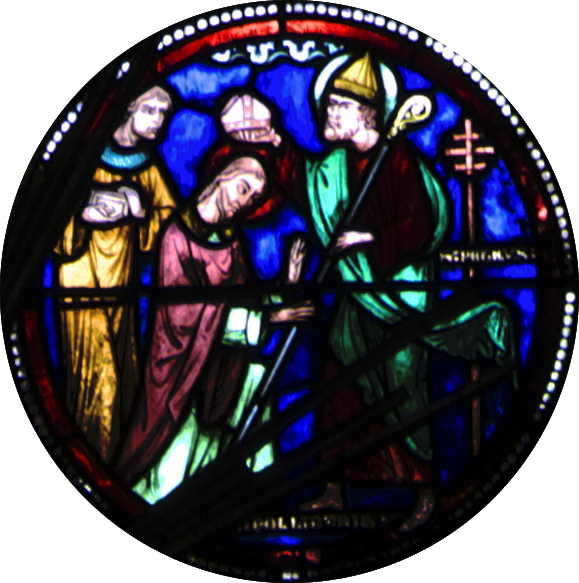
Ordination of St. Apollinaris, Troyes Cathedral

=== Patronage ===
Apollinaris is the patron saint of Ravenna, and Emilia-Romagna. He is also the patron saint of Düsseldorf, Germany. A noted miracle worker, Saint Apollinaris is considered especially effective against gout, venereal disease and epilepsy.

=== Iconography ===
Saint Apollinaris is represented with a pastoral staff, palm, and pallium. The story of Saint Apollinaris is told in stained glass in the Troyes Cathedral.

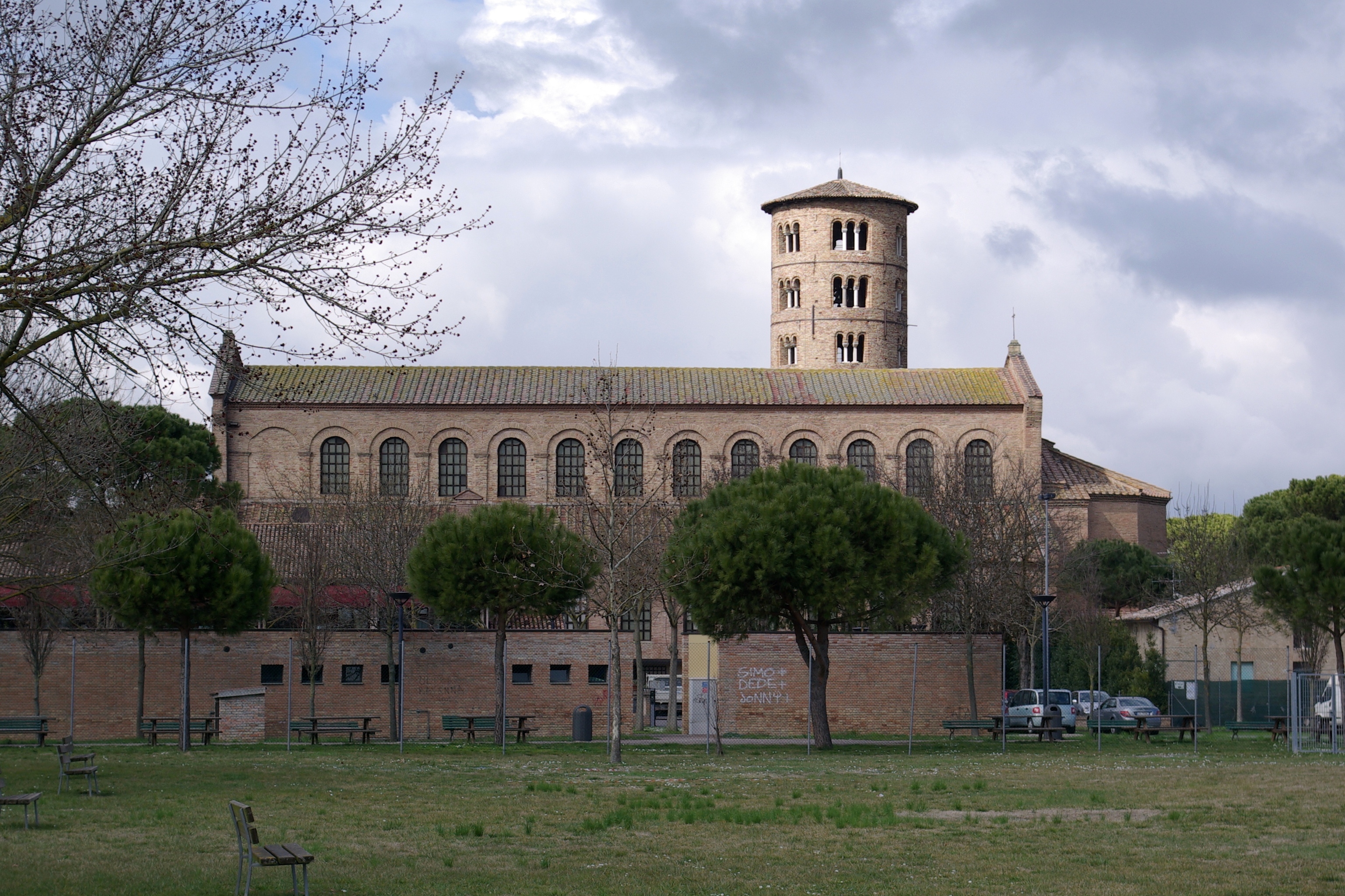
Sant'Apollinare in Classe, Ravenna

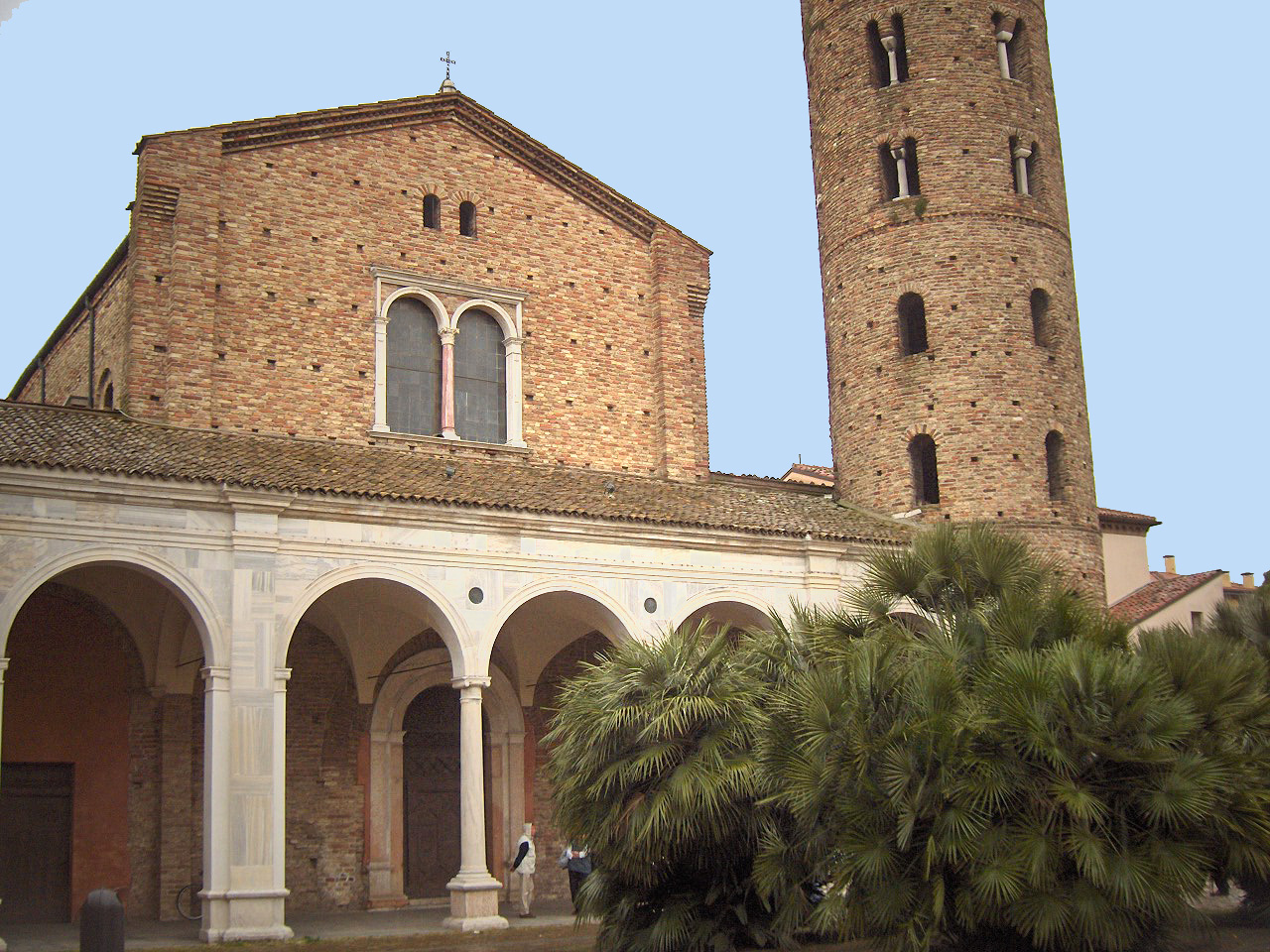
Sant'Apollinare Nuovo, Ravenna

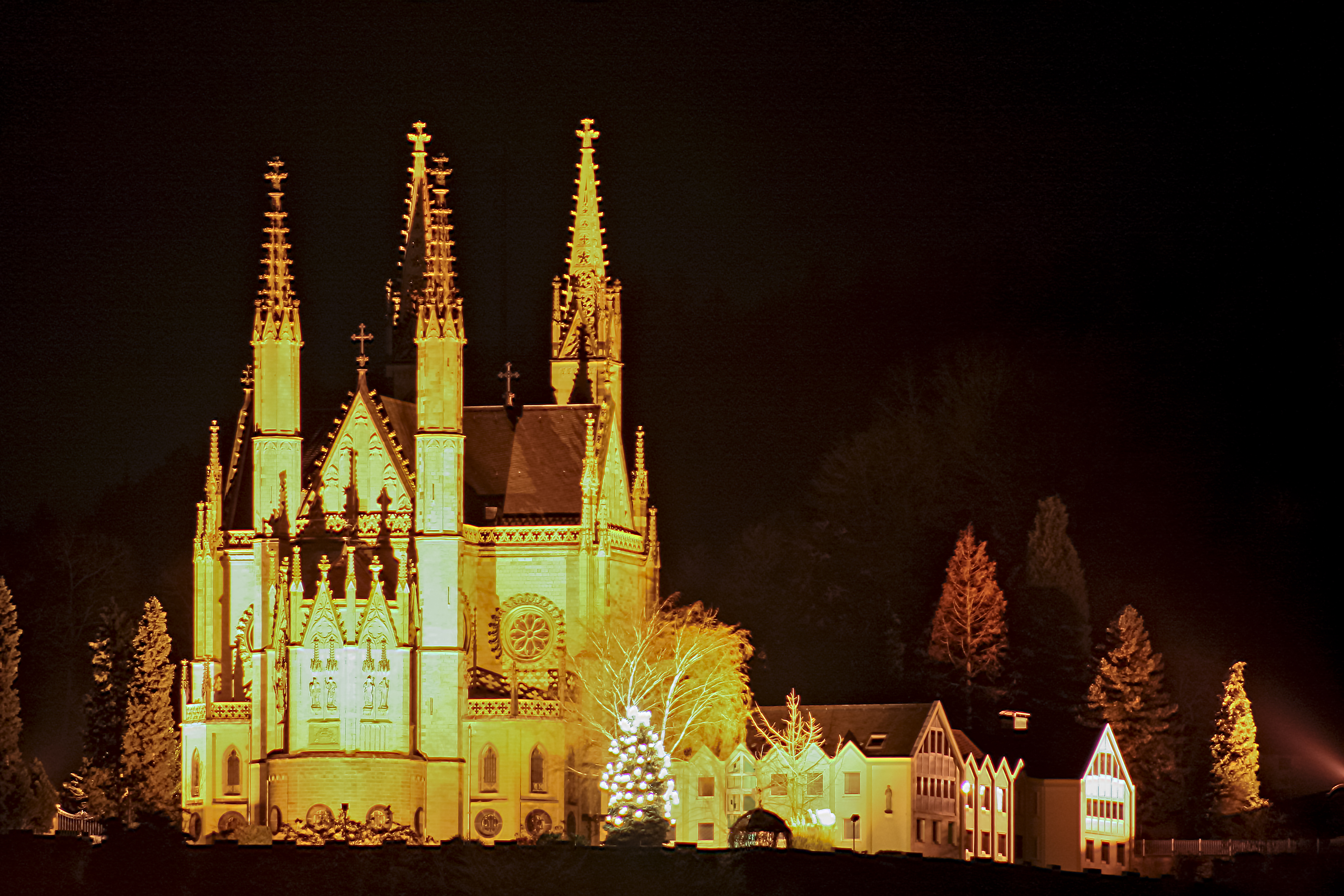
Apollinariskirche, Remagen

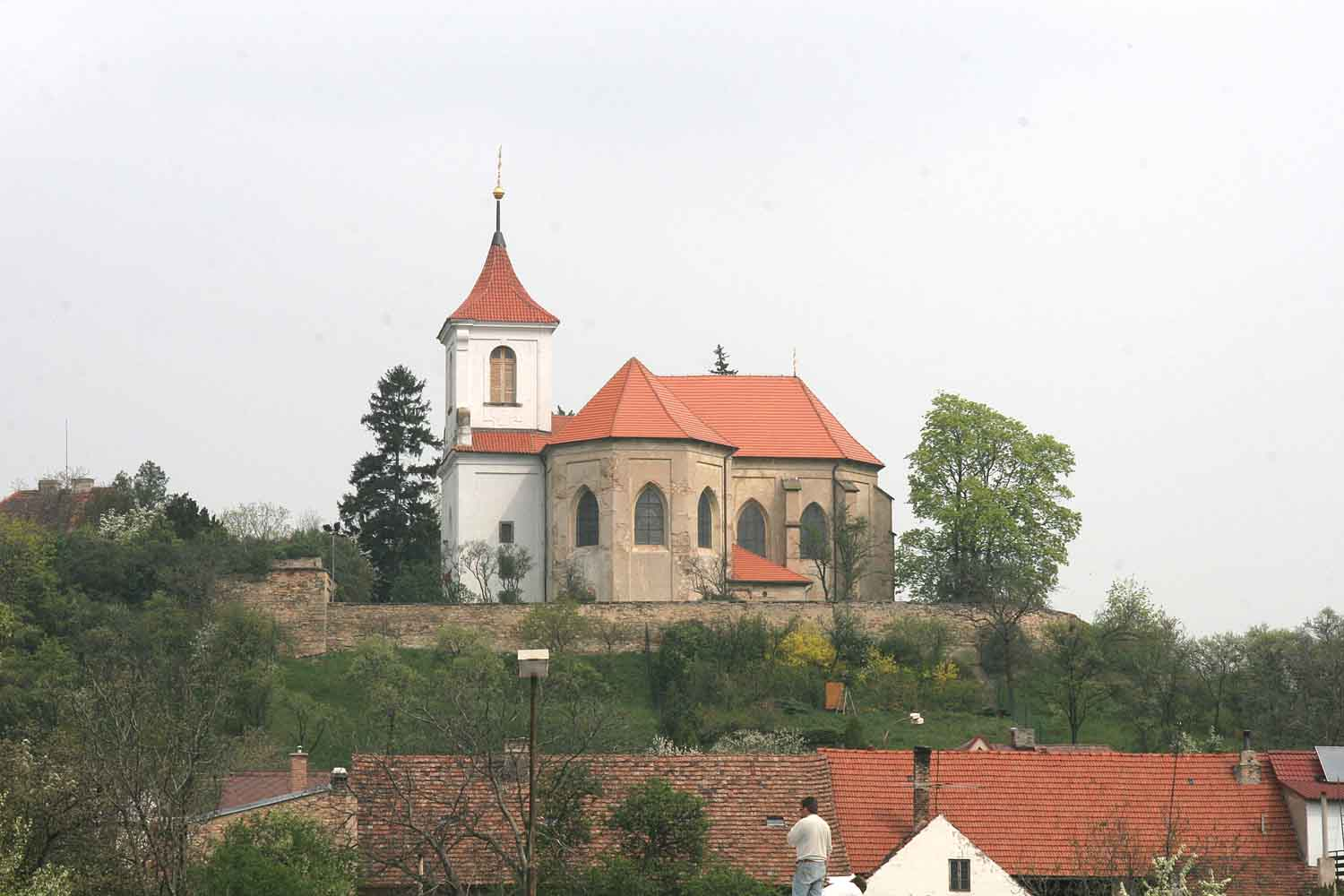
Church of St. Apollinaris, Sadská, Czech Republic

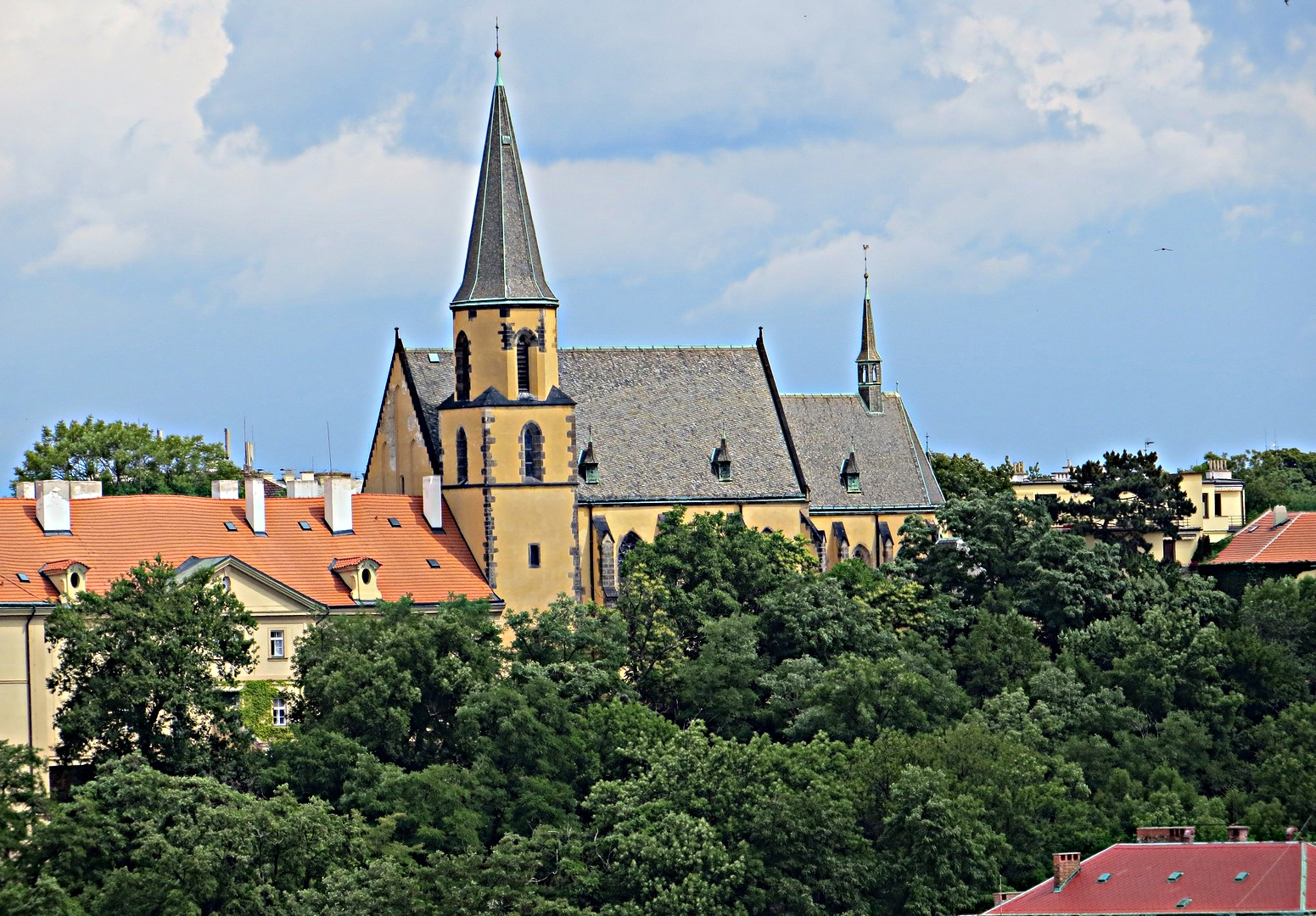
Church of St. Apollinaris, Prague

== Sources ==
- Everett, Nicholas (2016). Patron Saints of Early Medieval Italy, c. 350–800 AD. PIMS/Durham University Press. pp. 139–170.
- Ælfric of Eynsham (1881). "Of Saint Apollinaris" . Ælfric's Lives of Saints. London, Pub. for the Early English text society, by N. Trübner & co.
