= Apollinariskirche, Remagen =

Roman Catholic church in Remagen, Germany

Coordinates: 50°34′52″N 7°13′17″E

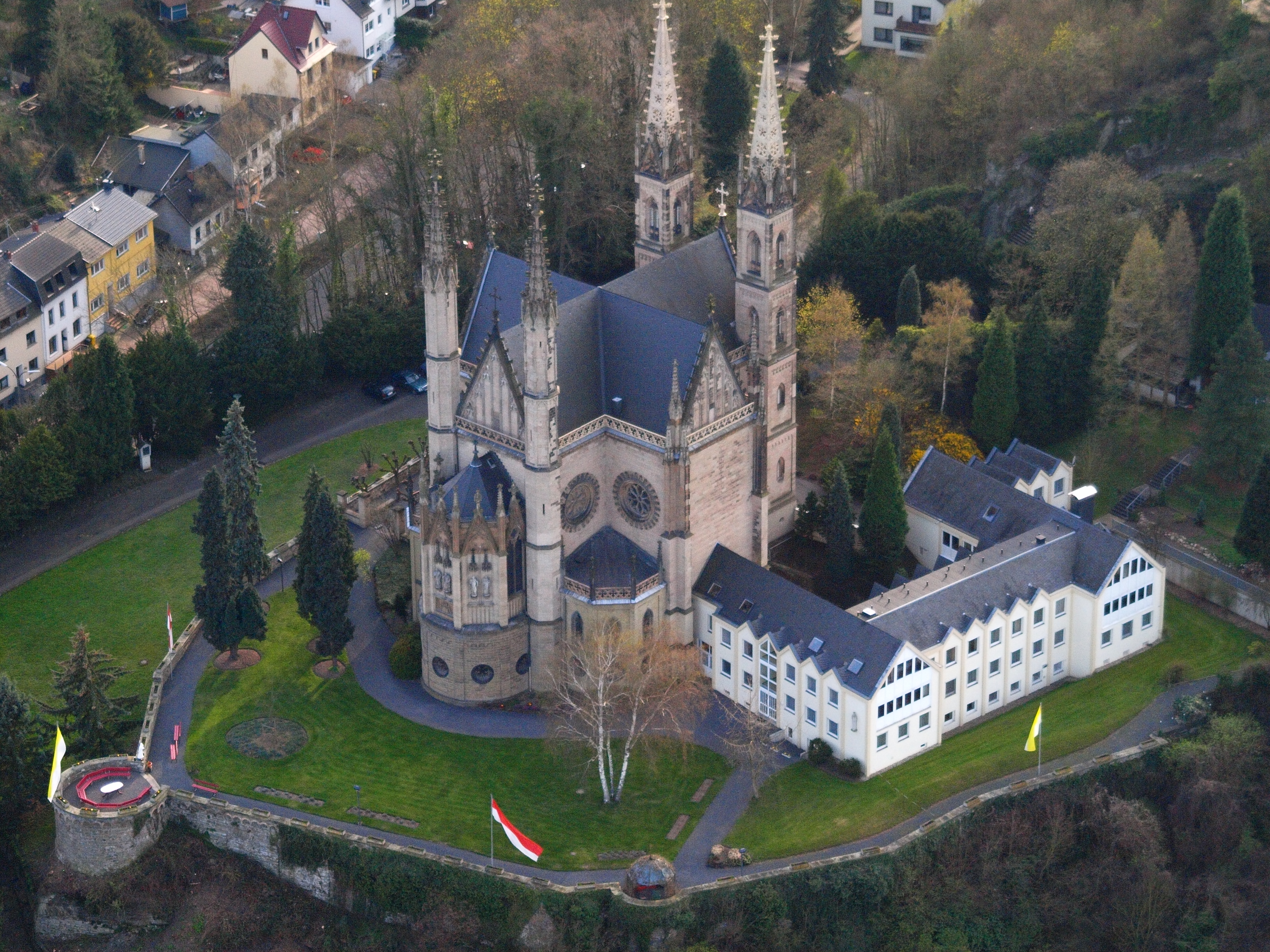
An aerial view of the Apollinariskirche

The Apollinariskirche is a church on the site of a Roman temple on the Apollinarisberg, a hill above the German town of Remagen. That hill was known as the Martinsberg in the 5th and 6th centuries, presumably after a Frankish chapel there dedicated to Saint Martin, patron of the Franks. In the 9th century this chapel was replaced by a Romanesque church.

In 1110 the Benedictines of the Michaelsberg Abbey, on the initiative of the people of Remagen, set up a provost there. The relics of Saint Apollinaris of Ravenna probably arrived on the mountain at the end of the 14th century, since a pilgrimage to the Apollinarisberg is recorded in 1384. The sarcophagus is the main relic in the 14th century crypt of the church.

A new Neo-Gothic church was built on the site from 1837 to 1852.
