= ERGO-Platz/Klever Straße station =

Underground rail station

ERGO-Platz/Klever Straße
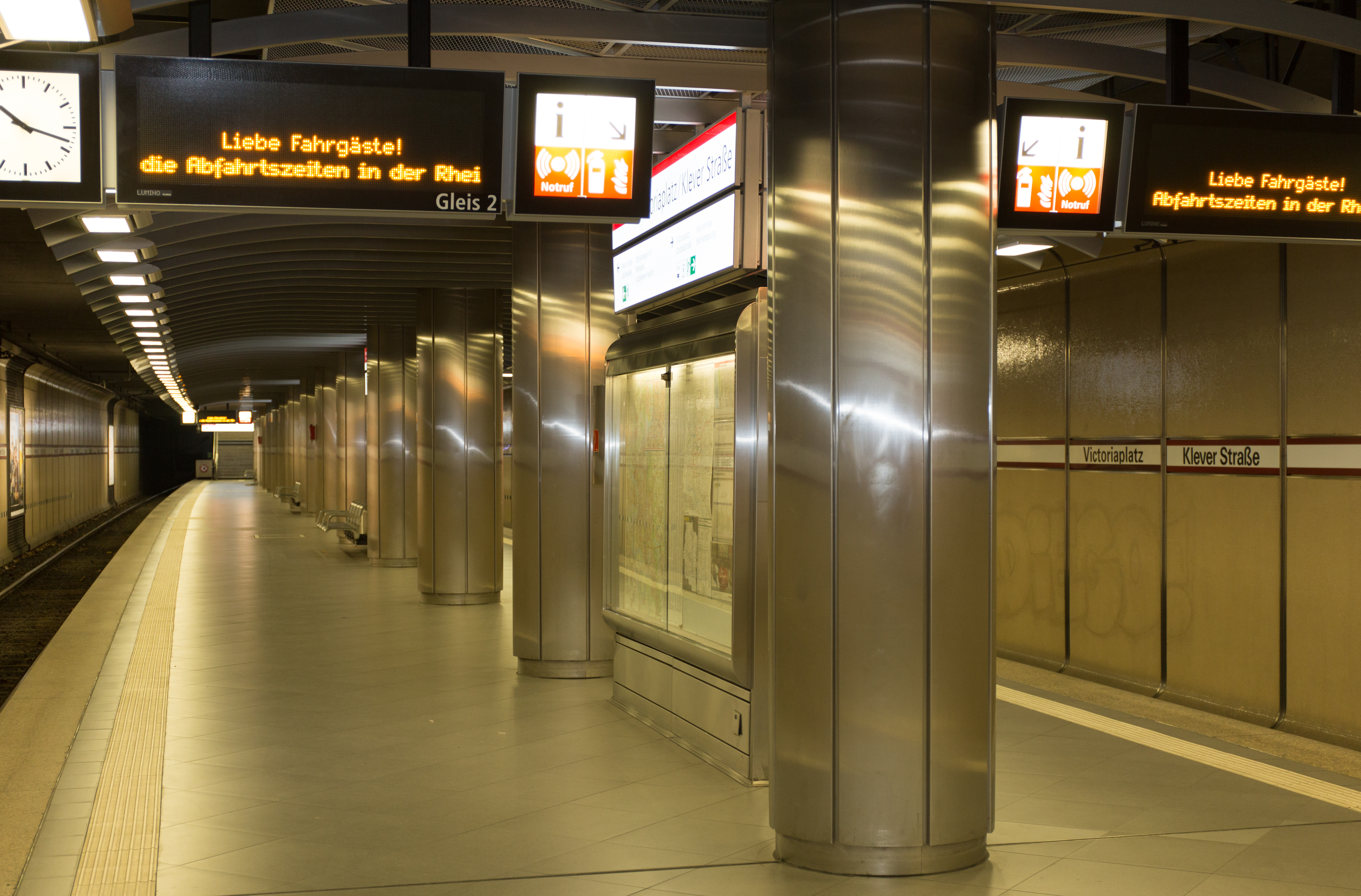
- ERGO-Platz/Klever Straße station platform in 2016

General information
- Location: Düsseldorf; Germany
- Coordinates: 51°14′22″N 6°46′24″E
- Platforms: 1 island platform
- Tracks: 2

Construction
- Structure type: Underground

History
- Opened: 3 October 1981
- Previous names: Victoriaplatz/Klever Straße

Services
Preceding station	Rhine-Ruhr Stadtbahn	Following station
Kennedydamm towards Merkur Spiel-Arena/Messe Nord	U78	Nordstraße towards Düsseldorf Hbf
Kennedydamm towards Duisburg-Meiderich Süd	U79	Nordstraße towards Universität Ost/Botanischer Garten
Location

ERGO-Platz/Klever Straße station is an underground station on the Düsseldorf Stadtbahn lines U78 and U79 in Düsseldorf. The station lies on Klever Straße near ERGO-Platz in the district of Pempelfort, close to the district of Golzheim.

The station was previously named Victoriaplatz/Klever Straße until 2023, but was renamed ERGO-Platz/Klever Straße at the request of ERGO Insurance Group, after Victoriaplatz was renamed ERGO-Platz in 2018. The company's headquarters is located near the station.

The station was opened on 3 October 198 and has one island platform with two faces.
