= Nordstraße station =

Underground rail station

Nordstraße
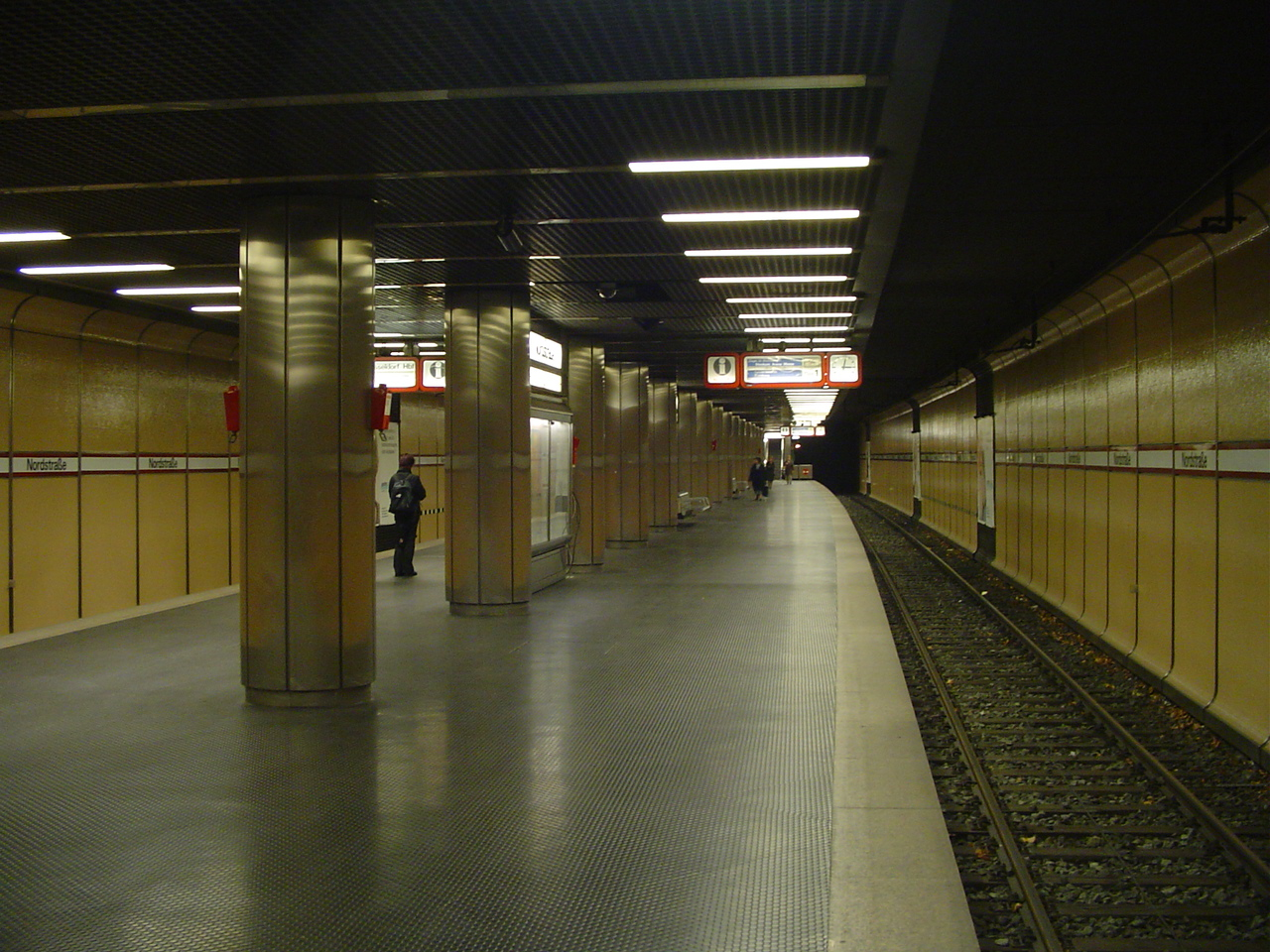
- Nordstraße station platform in 2006

General information
- Location: Düsseldorf; Germany
- Coordinates: 51°14′7″N 6°46′38″E
- Platforms: 1 island platform
- Tracks: 2
- Connections: Dusseldorf tram: 701, 705

Construction
- Structure type: Underground

History
- Opened: 3 October 1981

Services
Preceding station	Rhine-Ruhr Stadtbahn	Following station
Victoriaplatz/Klever Straße towards Merkur Spiel-Arena/Messe Nord	U78	Heinrich-Heine-Allee towards Düsseldorf Hbf
Victoriaplatz/Klever Straße towards Duisburg-Meiderich Süd	U79	Heinrich-Heine-Allee towards Universität Ost/Botanischer Garten
Location

Nordstraße station is an underground station on the Düsseldorf Stadtbahn lines U78 and U79 in Düsseldorf. The station lies on Nordstraße in the district of Pempelfort.

The station was opened on October 3, 1981, and consists of one island platform with two rail tracks. Tram lines 701 and 705 stop on the surface near the station.

In 2003, a 50-year-old man drove his car into the entrance of the station on street level (without going all the way in) when he thought it was entrance to a car park. Likewise, in 2007, a 52-year-old woman drove her car into the entrance staircase, also thinking it would lead to a car park.
