= Steinstraße/Königsallee station =

Underground rail station

Steinstraße/Königsallee
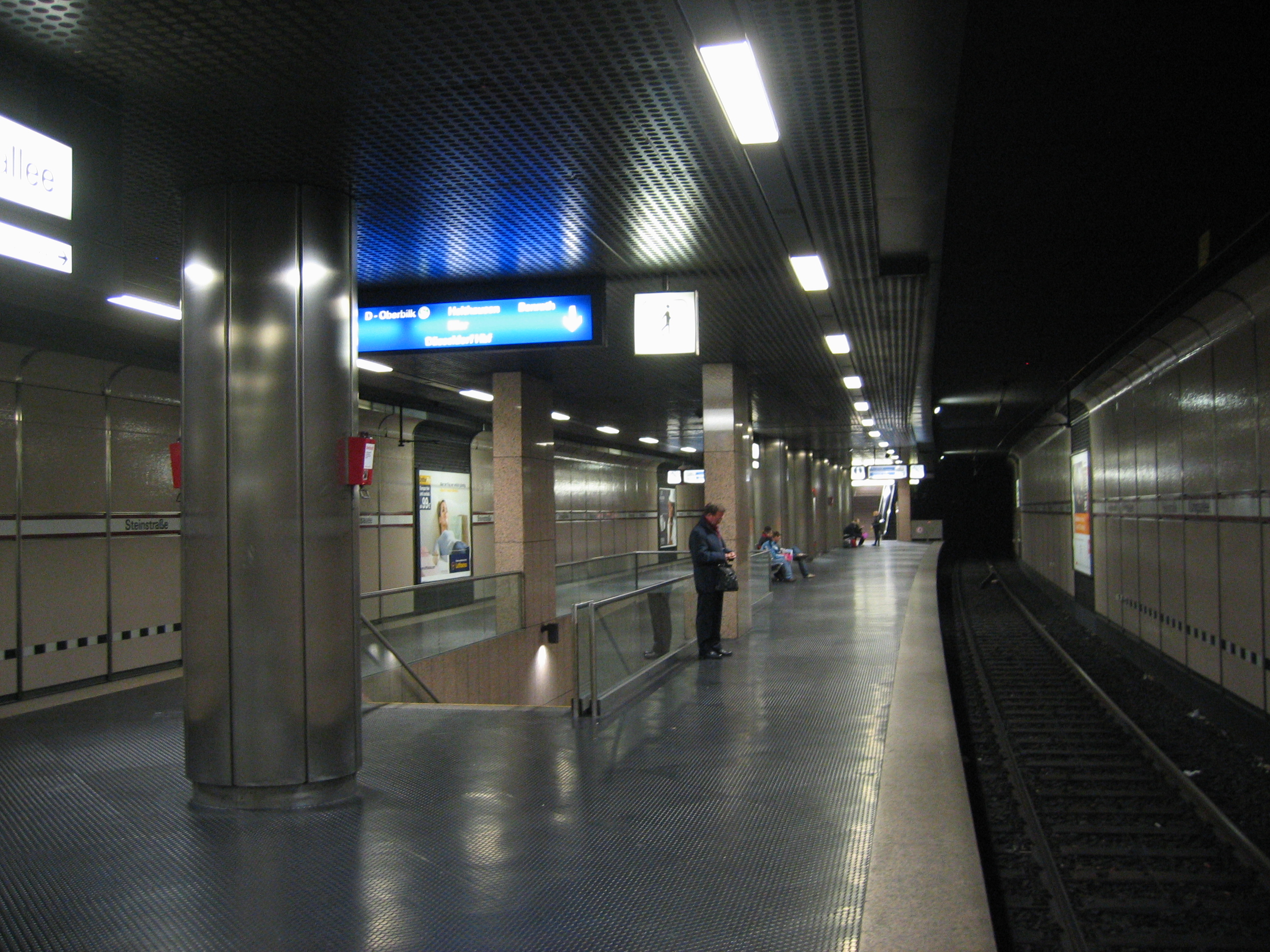
- Steinstraße/Königsallee station platform in 2006

General information
- Location: Düsseldorf; Germany
- Coordinates: 51°13′23″N 6°46′51″E
- Platforms: 1 island platforms (upper level); 1 island platform (lower level)
- Tracks: 2 (upper level); 2 (lower level)
- Connections: Dusseldorf tram: 701, 705, 706

Construction
- Structure type: Underground
- Platform levels: 2

History
- Opened: 7 May 1988

Services
Preceding station	Rhine-Ruhr Stadtbahn	Following station
Heinrich-Heine-Allee towards Krefeld Rheinstraße	U70	Oststraße towards Düsseldorf Hbf
Heinrich-Heine-Allee towards Meerbusch-Görgesheide	U74	Oststraße towards Holthausen
Heinrich-Heine-Allee towards Neuss Hbf	U75	Oststraße towards Eller Vennhauser Allee
Heinrich-Heine-Allee towards Krefeld Rheinstraße	U76	Oststraße towards Handelszentrum/Moskauer Straße
Heinrich-Heine-Allee towards Am Seestern	U77	Oststraße towards Holthausen
Heinrich-Heine-Allee towards Merkur Spiel-Arena/Messe Nord	U78	Oststraße towards Düsseldorf Hbf
Heinrich-Heine-Allee towards Duisburg-Meiderich Süd	U79	Oststraße towards Universität Ost/Botanischer Garten
Location

Steinstraße/Königsallee station is a major underground station on the Düsseldorf Stadtbahn lines U70, U74, U75, U76, U77, U78 and U79 in Düsseldorf. The station lies on the junction of Steinstraße and Königsallee in the district of Stadtmitte.

The station was opened in 1988 and consists of two island platform with four rail tracks on three levels. On the surface, Interchange to Tram lines 701, 705 and 706 is possible.
