= Oststraße station =

Underground rail station

Oststraße
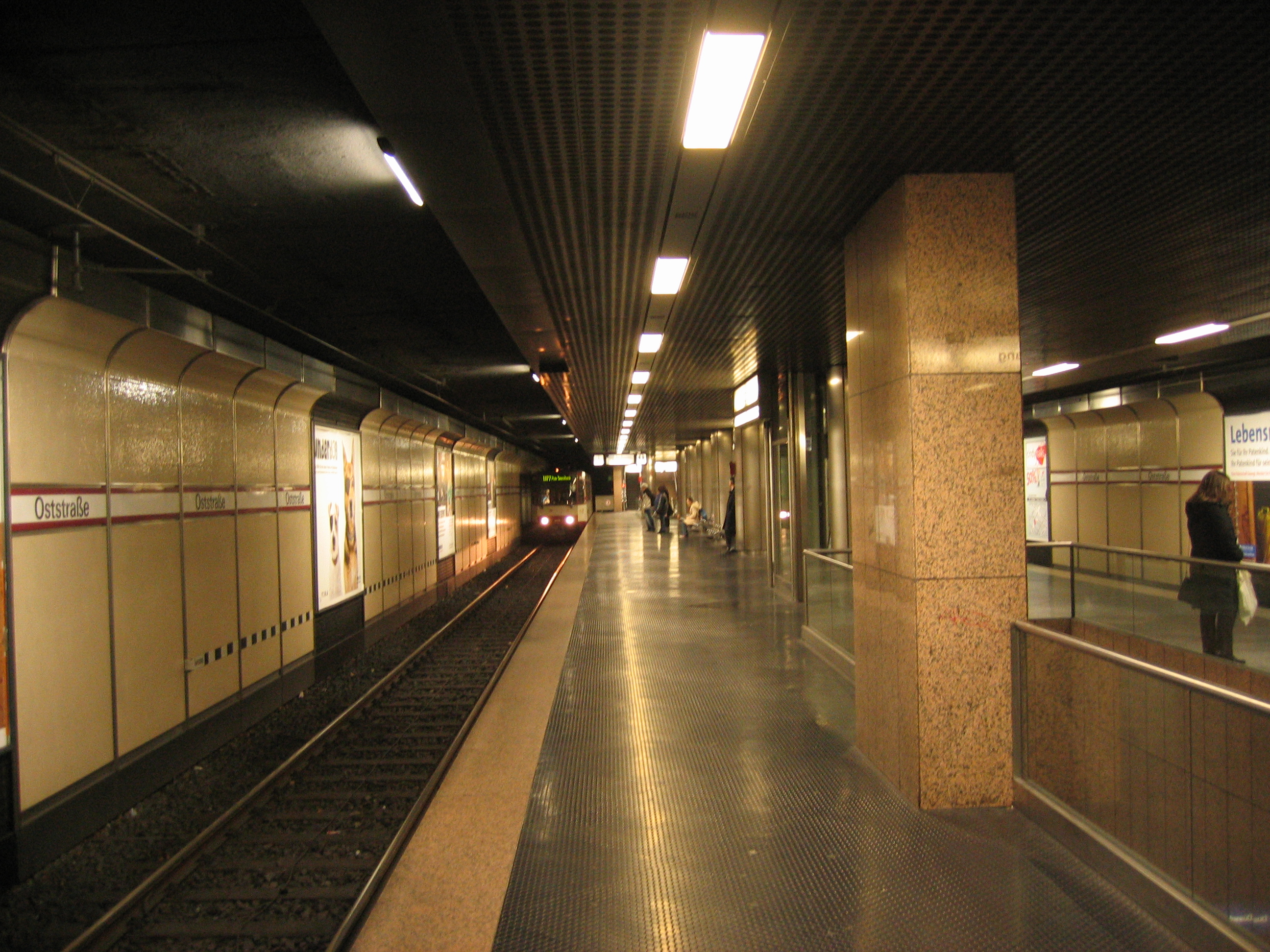
- Oststraße station platform in 2006

General information
- Location: Düsseldorf; Germany
- Coordinates: 51°13′22″N 6°47′12″E
- Platforms: 1 island platforms (upper level); 1 island platform (lower level)
- Tracks: 2 (upper level); 2 (lower level)
- Connections: Dusseldorf tram: 707

Construction
- Structure type: Underground
- Platform levels: 2

History
- Opened: 7 May 1988

Services
Preceding station	Rhine-Ruhr Stadtbahn	Following station
Steinstraße/Königsallee towards Krefeld Rheinstraße	U70	Düsseldorf Hbf Terminus
Steinstraße/Königsallee towards Meerbusch-Görgesheide	U74	Düsseldorf Hbf towards Holthausen
Steinstraße/Königsallee towards Neuss Hbf	U75	Düsseldorf Hbf towards Eller Vennhauser Allee
Steinstraße/Königsallee towards Krefeld Rheinstraße	U76	Düsseldorf Hbf towards Handelszentrum/Moskauer Straße
Steinstraße/Königsallee towards Am Seestern	U77	Düsseldorf Hbf towards Holthausen
Steinstraße/Königsallee towards Merkur Spiel-Arena/Messe Nord	U78	Düsseldorf Hbf Terminus
Steinstraße/Königsallee towards Duisburg-Meiderich Süd	U79	Düsseldorf Hbf towards Universität Ost/Botanischer Garten
Location

Oststraße station is a major underground station on the Düsseldorf Stadtbahn lines U70, U74, U75, U76, U77, U78 and U79 in Düsseldorf. The station lies on Oststraße in the district of Stadtmitte.

The station was opened in 1988 and consists of two island platform with four rail tracks on three levels. On the surface, Charlottenstraße/Oststraße station is located within walking distance and offers connections to Tram line 707.
