= Düsseldorf Wehrhahn station =

Railway station in Düsseldorf, Germany

Düsseldorf Wehrhahn
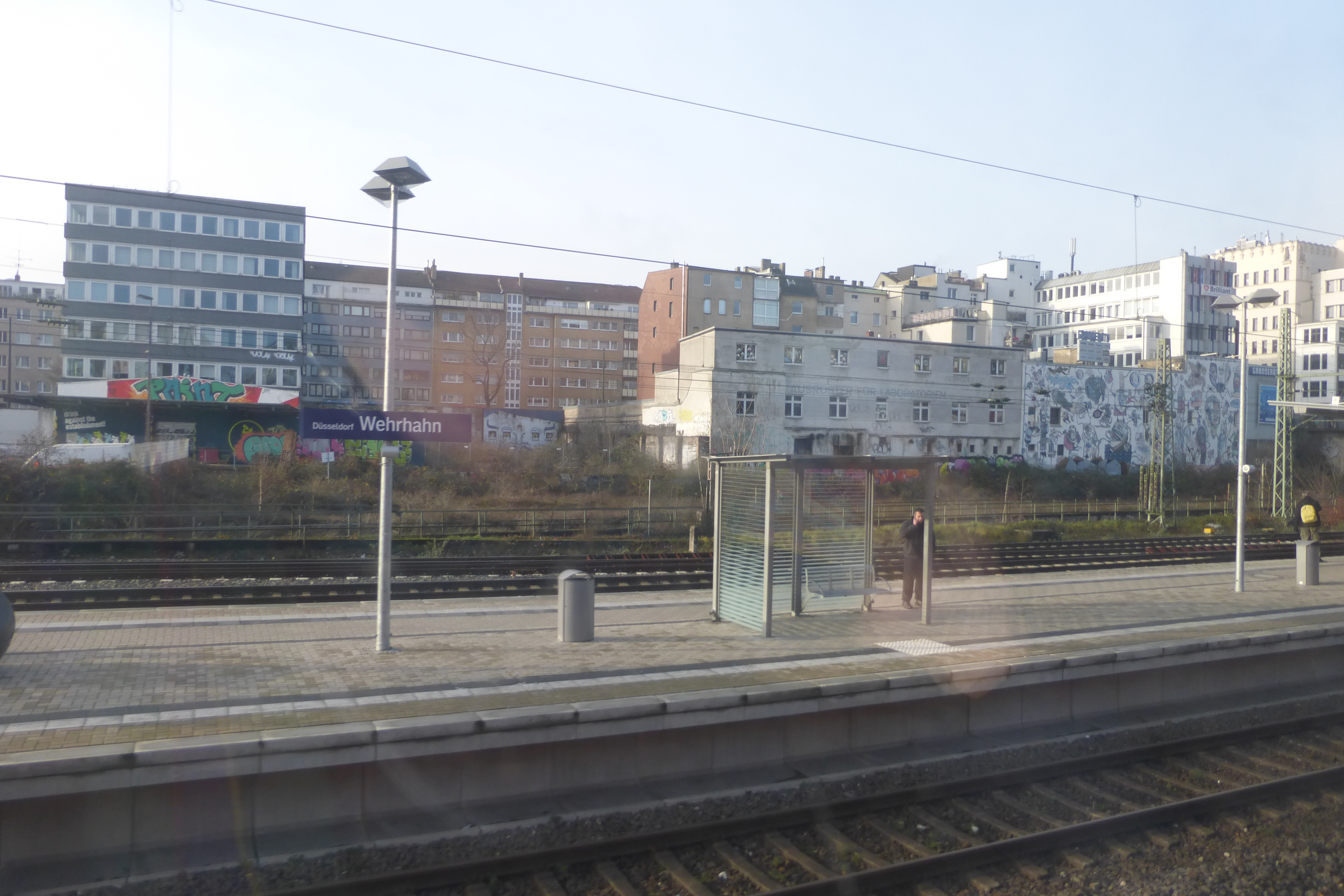

General information
- Location: Düsseldorf, NRW; Germany
- Coordinates: 51°13′46.5″N 6°47′51.8″E
- Lines: Cologne–Duisburg (KBS 415); Düsseldorf–Essen
- Platforms: 2

Construction
- Accessible: Yes

Other information
- Station code: 1403
- DS100 code: KDW
- IBNR: 8001582
- Category: 4
- Fare zone: VRR: 430; VRS: 1430 (VRR transitional zone)
- Website: www.bahnhof.de

History
- Opened: 1967

Passengers
- 15,000–20,000

Services
Preceding station	Rhine-Ruhr S-Bahn	Following station
Düsseldorf Hbf towards Solingen Hbf	S1	Düsseldorf Zoo towards Dortmund Hbf
Düsseldorf Hbf towards Köln-Nippes	S6	Düsseldorf Zoo towards Essen Hbf
Preceding station	Cologne S-Bahn	Following station
Düsseldorf Hbf towards Bergisch Gladbach	S11	Düsseldorf Zoo towards Düsseldorf Airport Terminal
Preceding station	Rhine-Ruhr Stadtbahn	Following station
Uhlandstraße towards Düsseldorf-Rath	U71	Pempelforter Straße towards Benrath Betriebshof
Uhlandstraße towards Hellriegelstraße	U72	Pempelforter Straße towards Ratingen Mitte
Uhlandstraße towards Universität Ost/Botanischer Garten	U73	Pempelforter Straße towards Düsseldorf-Gerresheim
Uhlandstraße towards Gerresheim Krankenhaus	U83	Pempelforter Straße towards Benrath Betriebshof
Location
- Location within North Rhine-Westphalia

Düsseldorf Wehrhahn station is located about one kilometre north of Düsseldorf Hauptbahnhof in central Düsseldorf in the German state of North Rhine-Westphalia. It is on the Cologne–Duisburg line and is classified by Deutsche Bahn as a category 4 station.

Düsseldorf Wehrhahn is also a stop for several bus routes. It is also stop of the new Wehrhahn-line which consists four Stadtbahn lines.

== Station layout ==
The station is centrally located between the districts of Düsseldorf-Stadtmitte, Düsseldorf-Flingern and Düsseldorf-Düsseltal. The station is located below a road bridge, over which buses and Stadtbahn cross the station area and which is also the beginning of Grafenberger Allee.

== Lines ==
The station is served by Rhine-Ruhr S-Bahn lines S1 (every 30 minutes during the day) and S6 (every 20 minutes) and Cologne S-Bahn line S11 (every 20 minutes). Six tram lines and seven bus routes stop at Düsseldorf Wehrhahn stop above the station and at Birkenstraße and Elisabethkirche stops, which are located on the exit to Ackerstraße in Flingern-Nord district.

== Stadtbahn ==
The Düsseldorf Stadtbahn has a tunnel from Düsseldorf-Bilk station to Düsseldorf-Wehrhahn station, known as the Wehrhahn line (German: Wehrhahn-Linie). This 3.5 km tunnel was completed in 2016. Just as every other underground line opened previously in Düsseldorf, the Wehrhahn line is a replacement for current surface tram lines. The trams on this line enter the new tunnel via a ramp at Bilk station and run from there underneath the city centre towards the north-east, where they emerge shortly before Wehrhahn railway station, hence the line's nickname. Five new underground stations and the station Heinrich-Heine-Allee are part of the line, which serve an estimated daily passenger volume of approximately 53,000. These new stations are Pempelforter Straße, Schadowstraße, the existing station Heinrich-Heine-Allee, Benrather Straße, Graf-Adolf-Platz and Kirchplatz (Düsseldorf) in the direction from Wehrhahn station to Bilk station.
