= Kunsthalle Düsseldorf =

Museum in Germany

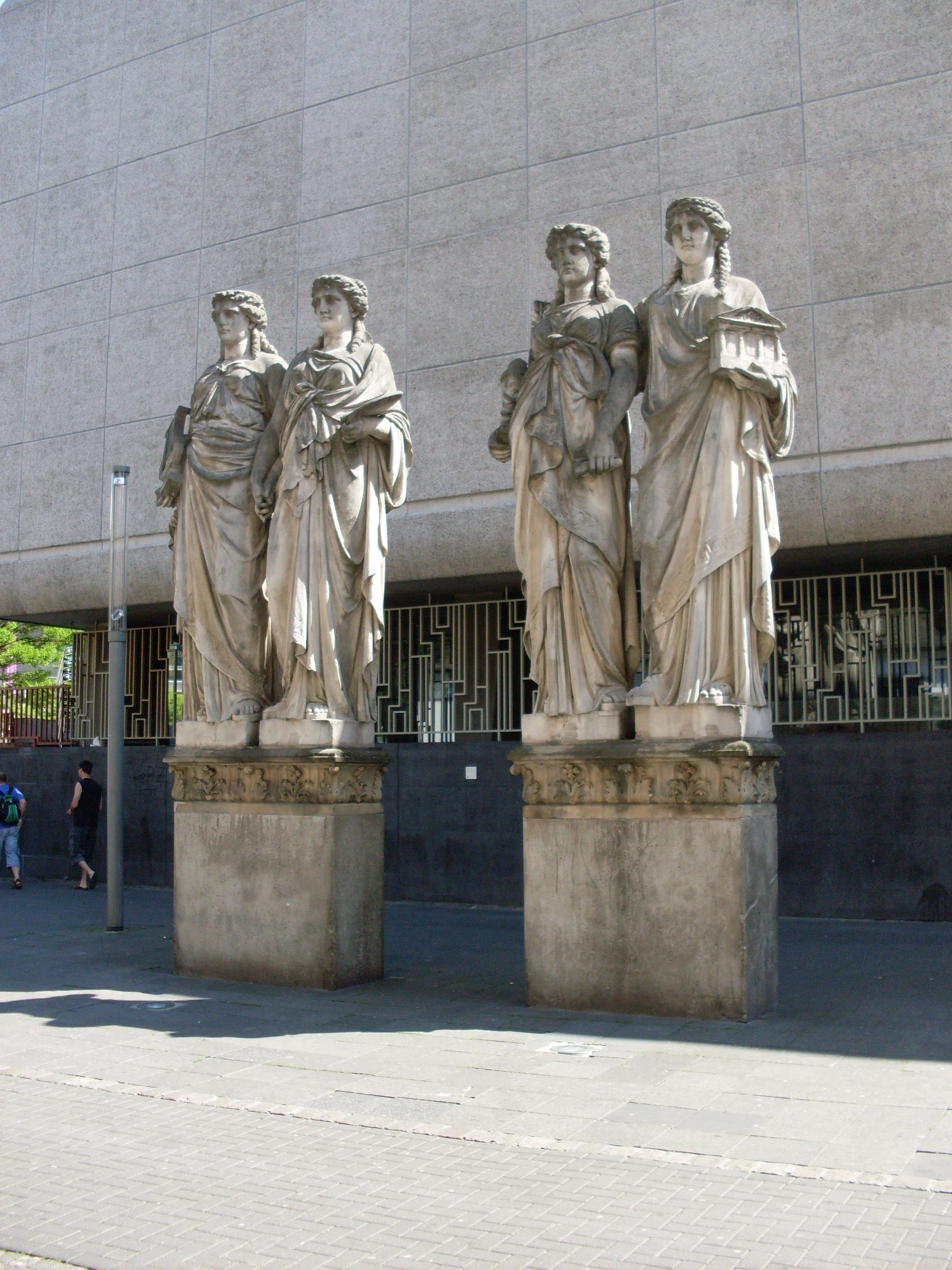
- Caryatid figures by Leo Müsch in front with the concrete facade of the Kunsthalle
- Established: 1967
- Location: Düsseldorf
- Coordinates: 51°13′39″N 6°46′33″E
- Type: Contemporary art
- Director: Gregor Jansen
- Public transit access: Düsseldorf Stadtbahn: U70 U74 U75 U76 U77 U78 U79 at Heinrich-Heine-Allee
- Website: www.kunsthalle-duesseldorf.de

Kunsthalle Düsseldorf is an exhibition hall for contemporary art in Düsseldorf.

== Building ==
The present art centre was built in 1967 in Brutalist architecture by the architects Konrad Beckmann and Brockes. They used commercially available precast concrete for the construction work.

== History ==
Ever since the building on the Grabbeplatz opened, it has housed two independent institutions, the Kunsthalle and the Kunstverein für die Rheinlande und Westfalen. Not merely externally different from all of the other museums in Düsseldorf, the Kunsthalle's conceptual direction is also distinct. Hosting an array of exhibitions, but without its own collection, contemporary art movements and positions, as well as their historical and local points of reference, were crucial to the Kunsthalle's program from the start. Pioneering shows were seen here, such as the series of "Prospect" exhibitions between 1968 and 1976, and so a number of international artists entered the European art market through the Düsseldorf Kunsthalle. It is the Kunsthalle's job to stimulate discussions and explorations of today's art, in its immediacy as well as in the context of current developments – meaning, a kind of art that is articulate, that enters into social discourse. Mediating contemporary art, revealing its roots and its continuity within the artistic discourse is of central importance.

At the end of the 1990s, Düsseldorf artists and citizens were successful in their efforts to retain the Kunsthalle. The building was temporarily closed for extensive renovation and modernization, which was carried out by the architectural team from rheinflügel. It has been open to visitors again since July 2002. Visitors are captivated by the inside of the building, thanks to its simple arrangement and the generous dimensions of its galleries. After renovation, the characteristics of these rooms were emphasized and optimized for presenting art. Discordant surfaces and technical additions were removed from floors, walls, and ceilings in favor of a new, smooth, glistening sheath that now hides installed technical equipment. The new lighting concept underscores the proportions of the rooms, and the façade of the entrance and the foyer zone, which extends from the ground floor to the second floor, once again fulfill the tasks of reception and orientation, as was foreseen in the original 1967 concept. The presence and form of the cashier's desk, bookshop, bar, and information desk have been designed to echo the cubist architecture of the Kunsthalle.

The tradition of the Kunsthalle Düsseldorf continued under the direction of Ulrike Groos from 2002 to 2009. With exhibitions like "Back to Concrete — The Beginnings of Punk and New Wave in Germany 1977– '82," "Ready to Shoot — Fernsehgalerie Gerry Schum, videogalerischum" (2003), "Palermo" (2007), "Sonic Youth etc.: Sensational Fix" (2009), and "Eating the Universe. Food in Art" (2009/2010) proved extremely popular. In the exhibition series "Compilation I — IV" younger artists, too, were presented.

Since January 2010, Gregor Jansen has been artistic director of the Kunsthalle Düsseldorf. Under his direction, international currents and Düsseldorf positions, new talents and "big" names will continue to find their place in this out-of-the-ordinary venue.

In 2023, they expanded into publishing, hosting an annual art book fair called Between Books.

== See also ==
- Kunst im Tunnel
