= Heinrich-Heine-Allee station =

Underground rail station

Heinrich-Heine-Allee
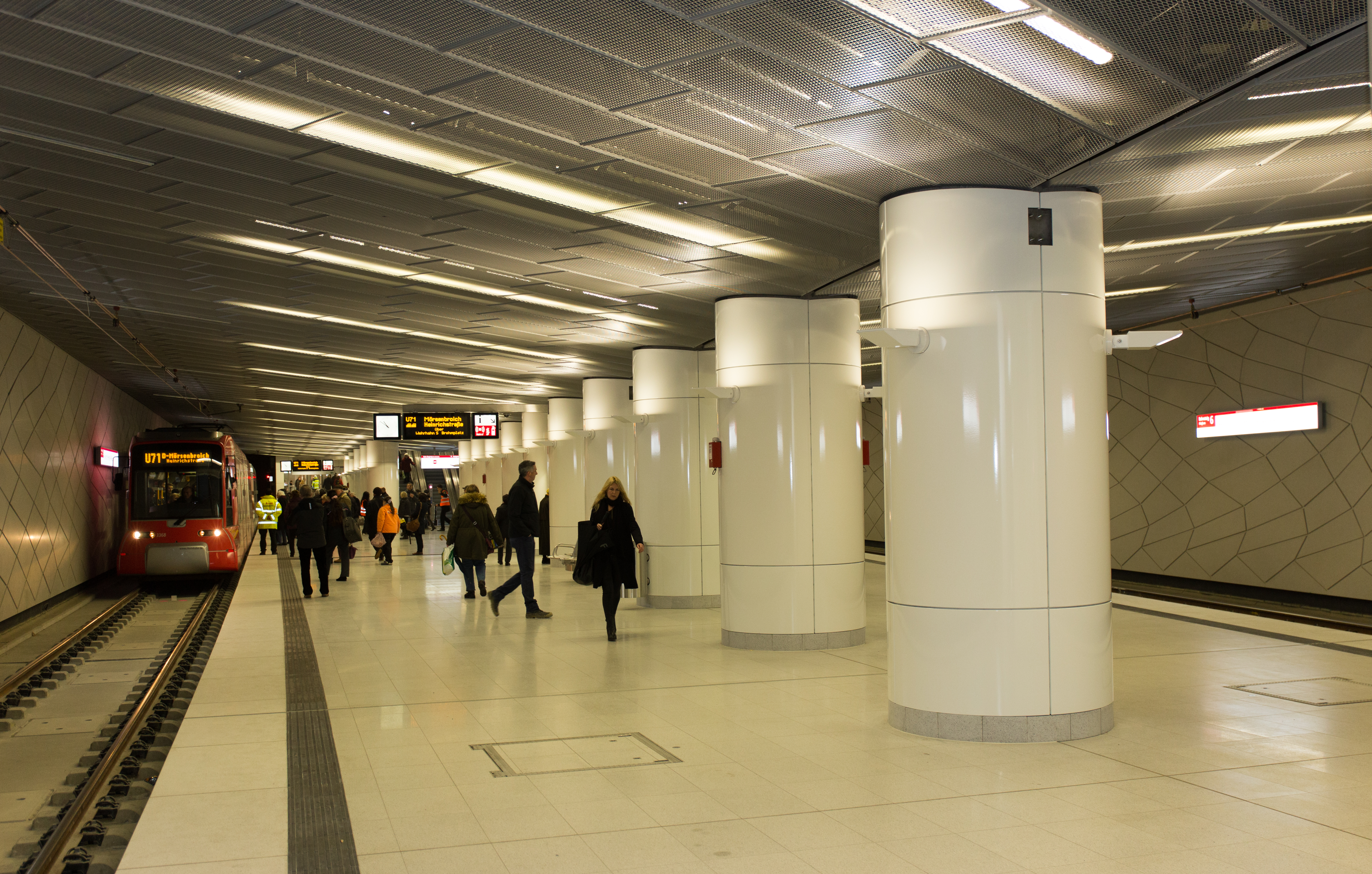
- Heinrich-Heine-Allee station platform in 2016

General information
- Location: Düsseldorf; Germany
- Coordinates: 51°13′32″N 6°46′35″E
- Platforms: 2 island platforms (upper level); 1 island platform (lower level)
- Tracks: 4 (upper level); 2 (lower level)

Construction
- Structure type: Underground
- Platform levels: 2

History
- Opened: 7 May 1988
- Rebuilt: 2016

Services
Preceding station	Rhine-Ruhr Stadtbahn	Following station
Tonhalle/Ehrenhof towards Krefeld Rheinstraße	U70	Steinstraße/Königsallee towards Düsseldorf Hbf
Schadowstraße towards Düsseldorf-Rath	U71	Benrather Straße towards Benrath Betriebshof
Schadowstraße towards Hellriegelstraße	U72	Benrather Straße towards Ratingen Mitte
Schadowstraße towards Universität Ost/Botanischer Garten	U73	Benrather Straße towards Düsseldorf-Gerresheim
Tonhalle/Ehrenhof towards Neuss Hbf	U75	Steinstraße/Königsallee towards Eller Vennhauser Allee
Tonhalle/Ehrenhof towards Krefeld Rheinstraße	U76	Steinstraße/Königsallee towards Handelszentrum/Moskauer Straße
Tonhalle/Ehrenhof towards Am Seestern	U77	Steinstraße/Königsallee towards Holthausen
Nordstraße towards Merkur Spiel-Arena/Messe Nord	U78	Steinstraße/Königsallee towards Düsseldorf Hbf
Nordstraße towards Duisburg-Meiderich Süd	U79	Steinstraße/Königsallee towards Universität Ost/Botanischer Garten
Schadowstraße towards Gerresheim Krankenhaus	U83	Benrather Straße towards Benrath Betriebshof
Location

Heinrich-Heine-Allee station is an underground light rail interchange station in Düsseldorf and is of particular importance because it is the only station to be served by all lines of the Düsseldorf Stadtbahn. The station lies on Heinrich-Heine-Allee in the district of Altstadt.

The station opened on 7 May 1988 with a mezzanine and one platform level with two island platforms serving four tracks. A lower platform level opened on 20 February 2016 with one island platform and two tracks.
