= Trams in Düsseldorf =

Tram network in Germany

Coordinates: 51°14′N 06°47′E

Düsseldorf tramway network
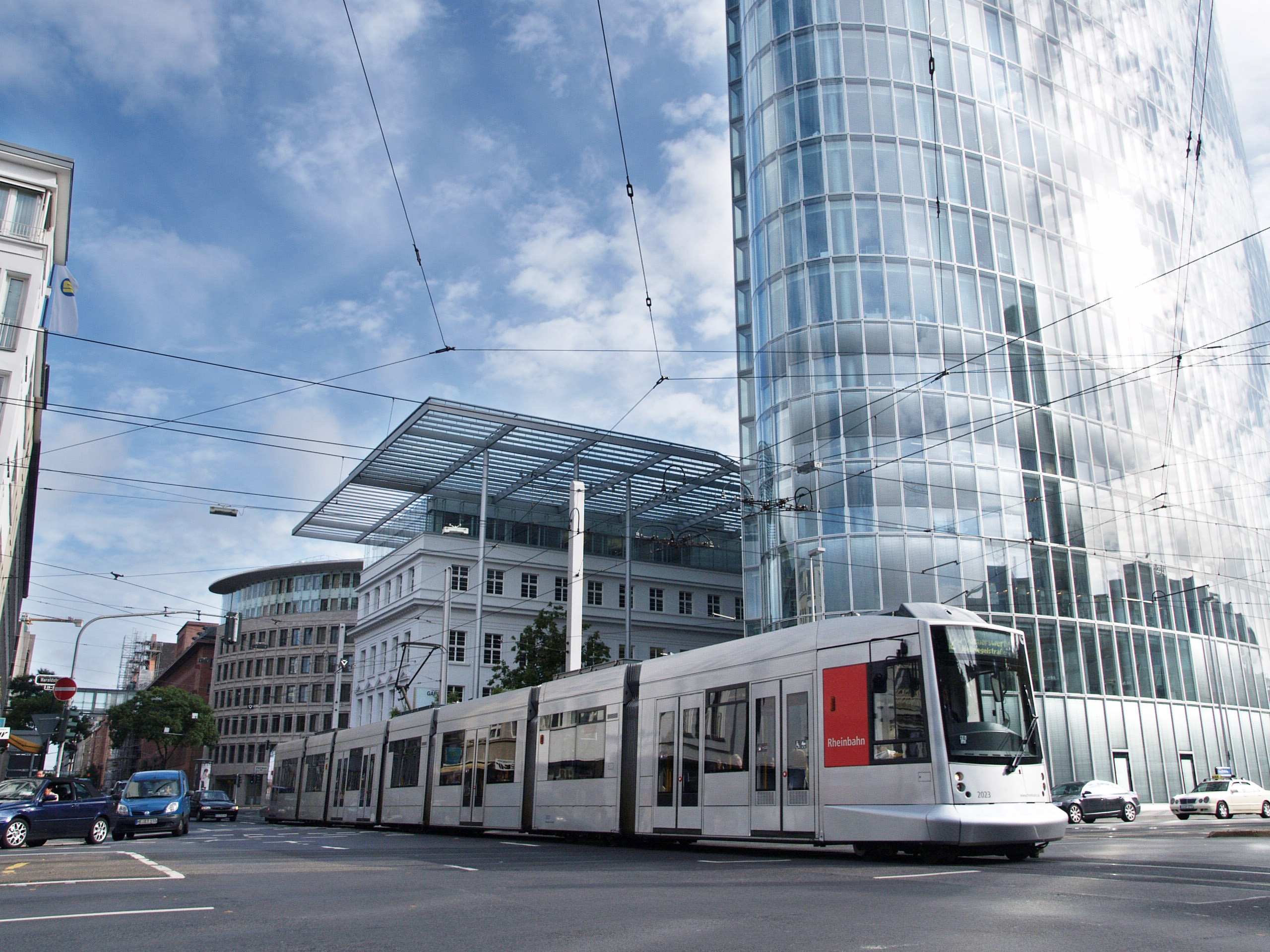
- A Düsseldorf tram at Graf-Adolf-Platz

Operation
- Locale: Düsseldorf and Neuss, North Rhine-Westphalia, Germany

Statistics
Horsecar era: 1876–1900
- Status: Converted to electricity
- Track gauge: 1,435 mm (4 ft 8 1/2 in)
- Propulsion system: Horses
Electric tram era: since 1891
- Status: Operational
- Lines: 7 (total line length 140.6 km (87.4 mi))
- Operator: Rheinbahn
- Track gauge: 1,435 mm (4 ft 8 1/2 in)
- Propulsion system: Electricity
- Stock: 175
- Route length: 78.0 km (48.5 mi)
- Stops: 178 (2012)
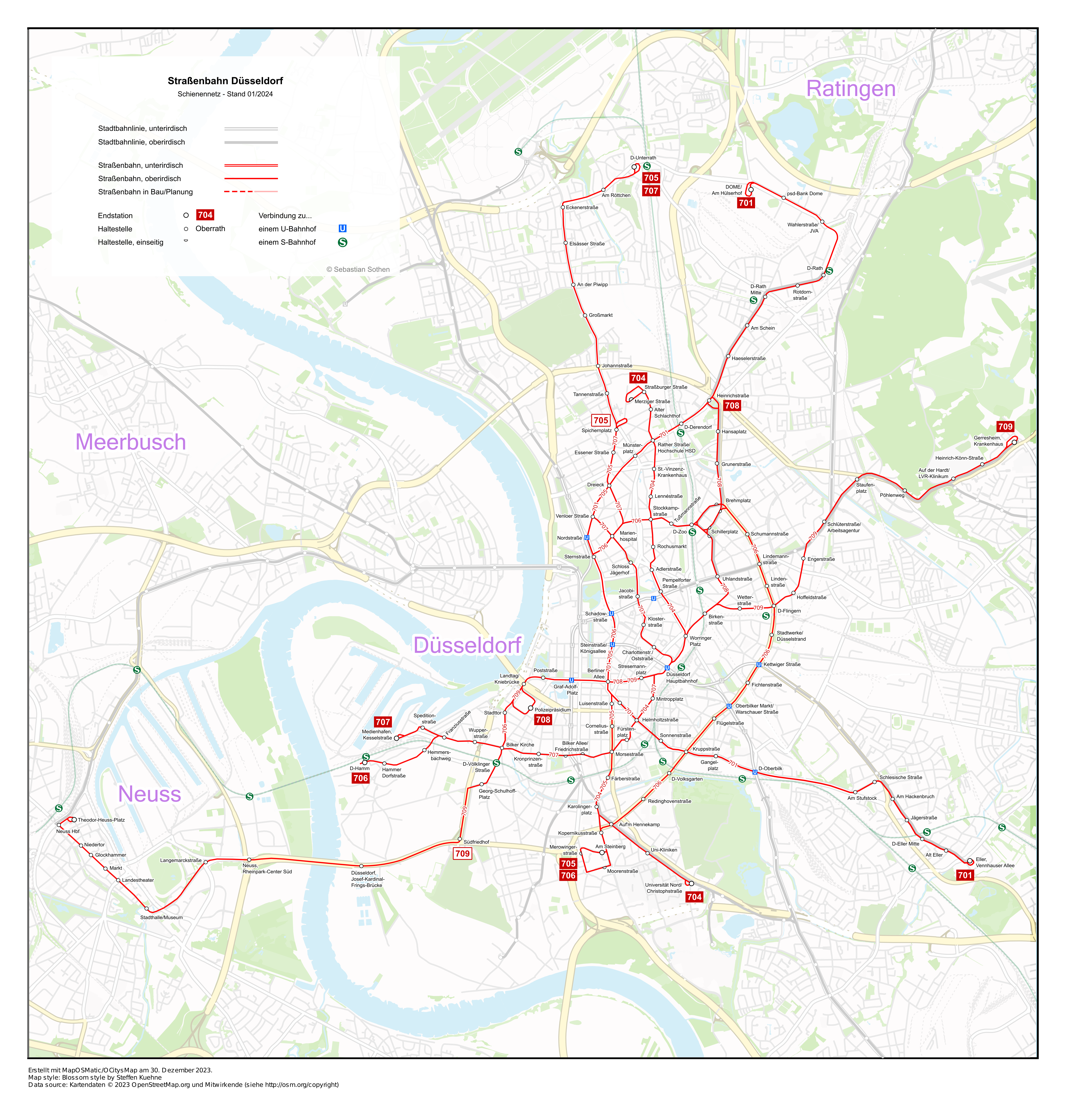
- Düsseldorf tramway network.
- Website: http://www.rheinbahn.com/ Rheinbahn

The Düsseldorf tramway network (German: Straßenbahnnetz Düsseldorf) is a network of tramways serving Düsseldorf, the capital city of the federal state of North Rhine-Westphalia, Germany. In combination with the Düsseldorf Stadtbahn and Rhine-Ruhr S-Bahn, it forms the backbone of the public transport system in Düsseldorf.

The tramway network is currently operated by Rheinbahn AG, and is integrated in the Verkehrsverbund Rhein-Ruhr (VRR). As of 2016, its seven tram lines ran over 78.0 kilometres (48.5 mi) of route, serving 178 stops.

== History ==
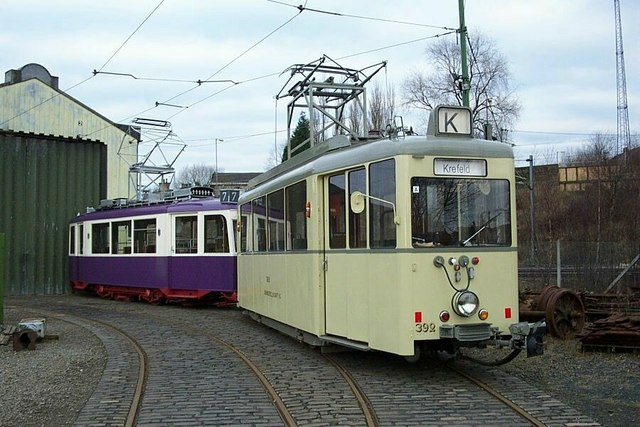
Düsseldorf tram now in Summerlee, Museum of Scottish Industrial Life

In 1876, the first horse-drawn tram line opened in Düsseldorf operated by the Belgian entrepreneur Leopold Boyaert. It joined Castle Square with the Bergisch-Märkischen station and the concert hall.

In 1896, the first electric tram ran in Düsseldorf, and the full conversion of the system to electricity continued through 1900.

== Lines ==
As of 2016, seven tram lines running on 78.0 kilometres (48.5 mi) of route, operate in the city of Düsseldorf and in portions of the urban areas of Neuss:

Line	Route	Stops	Run time	Takt Mo.–Fr./Sa./Su.
701	Düsseldorf, Dome/Am Hülshof – ISS Dome – Wahlerstrasse/JVA – Düsseldorf-Rath – Rotdornstraße – Düsseldorf-Rath Mitte – Am Schein – Haeselerstraße – Heinrichstraße – Düsseldorf-Derendorf – Rather Straße /Hochschule HSD – Münsterplatz – Dreieck – Venloer Straße – Nordstraße – Sternstraße – Schadowstraße (Downtown) – Steinstraße (to Subway Königsalle) – Berliner Allee – Luisenstraße – Helmholtzstraße – Sonnenstraße – Kruppstraße – Gangelplatz – Düsseldorf-Oberbilk – Am Stufstock – Schlesische Straße – Am Hackenbruch – Jägerstraße – Düsseldorf-Eller Mitte – Alt Eller – Vennhauser Allee (to Lore-Lorentz-Schule)	31	35 min	10/10/15 (20/20/30)
704	Merziger Straße – Straßburger Straße – Alter Schlachthof – Rather Straße/Hochschule HSD – Sankt-Vinzenz-Krankenhaus – Lennéstraße – Stockkampstraße – Rochusmarkt – Adlerstraße – Pempelforter Straße – Worringer Platz – Düsseldorf Hauptbahnhof (Main Station) – Mintropplatz – Helmholtzstraße – Fürstenplatz – Morsestraße – Färberstraße – Karolingerplatz – Auf’m Hennekamp – Uni-Kliniken – Universität Nord/Christophstraße	19	29 min	10/15/15 (-/-/15)
705	Düsseldorf-Unterrath – Am Röttchen – Eckenerstraße – Elsässer Straße – An der Piwipp – Großmarkt – Johannstraße – Tannenstraße – Spichernplatz – Essener Straße – Dreieck – Venloer Straße – Nordstraße – Marienhospital (only direction Unterrath) – Sternstraße – Schadowstraße (Downtown) – Steinstraße (to Subway Königsallee) – Berliner Allee – Luisenstraße – Corneliusstraße – Morsestraße – Färberstraße – Karolingerplatz – Kopernikusstraße – Am Steinberg (only direction Merowingerplatz) – Merowingerstraße (only direction Merowingerplatz) – Moorenstraße (only direction Merowingerplatz) – Merowingerplatz	29	43 min	10/10/15 (20/20/30)
706	Düsseldorf-Hamm – Hammer Dorfstraße – Hemmersbachweg – Franziusstraße – Wupperstraße – Bilker Kirche – Stadttor – Landtag/Kniebrücke – Poststraße – Graf-Adolf-Platz – Berliner Allee – Steinstraße (to Subway Königsallee) – Schadowstraße (Downtown) – Sternstraße – Marienhospital – Stockkampstraße – Tußmannstraße – Düsseldorf Zoo – Schillerplatz (only direction Am Steinberg) – Brehmplatz – Schumannstraße – Lindemannstraße – Lindenstraße – Düsseldorf-Flingern – Stadtwerke/Düsselstrand – Kettwiger Straße – Fichtenstraße (to Subway Oberbilker Markt) – Flügelstraße – Kruppstraße – Düsseldorf Volksgarten – Redinghovenstraße – Auf’m Hennekamp – Kopernikusstraße – Am Steinberg (only direction Moorenstrasse) – Merowingerstraße (only direction Moorenstrasse) – Merowingerplatz (only direction Moorenstrasse) – Moorenstraße	35	51 min	10/15/15
707	Düsseldorf-Unterrath – Am Röttchen – Eckenerstraße – Elsässer Straße – An der Piwipp – Großmarkt – Johannstraße – Tannenstraße – Spichernplatz – Essener Straße – Dreieck – Venloer Straße (only direction Unterrath) – Marienhospital – Schloss Jägerhof – Jacobistraße – Klosterstraße – Charlottenstraße (only to Subway Oststraße) – Düsseldorf Hauptbahnhof (Main Station) – Mintropplatz – Helmholtzstraße – Fürstenplatz – Morsestraße – Bilker Allee/Friedrichstraße – Kronprinzenstraße/Bilker Kirche – Wupperstraße – Franziusstraße – Speditionstraße – Medienhafen/Kesselstraße	29	43 min	10/10/15
708	Heinrichstraße – Hansaplatz – Grunerstraße – Brehmplatz – Schillerplatz – Uhlandstraße – Birkenstraße – Worringer Platz – Hauptbahnhof – Stresemannplatz – Berliner Allee – Graf-Adolf-Platz – Poststraße – Landtag/Kniebrücke – Polizeipräsidium	15	23 min	20/-/-
709	Gerresheim, Krankenhaus – Heinrich-Könn-Straße – Auf der Hardt/LVR-Klinikum – Pöhlenweg – (Grafenberg, Staufenplatz) – Burgmüllerstraße – Schlüterstraße/Arbeitsagentur – Engerstraße – Hoffeldstraße – Düsseldorf-Flingern – Wetterstraße – Birkenstraße – Worringer Platz – Düsseldorf Hauptbahnhof (Main Station) – Stresemannplatz – Berliner Allee – Graf-Adolf-Platz – Poststraße – Landtag/Kniebrücke – Stadttor – Bilker Kirche – D-Völklinger Straße – Georg-Schulhoff-Platz – Südfriedhof – Josef-Kardinal-Frings-Brücke – Neuss-Rheinpark Center Süd – Langemarckstraße – Neuss Stadthalle/Museum – Landestheater – Neuss Markt – Glockhammer – Niedertor – Neuss Hauptbahnhof (Main Station) – Neuss-Theodor-Heuss-Platz	33	54 min	10/10/15 (20/20/30)

After finishing work at the Wehrhahlinie, many of the tram lines (703, 712, 713 and 715) have been moved to the new Stadtbahn service.

== Rolling stock ==
As at November 2024, the fleet comprised Siemens NF6s 2101-2147, Siemens NF10s 2001-2036, Siemens NF8s 2201-2215 and Siemens NF8Us 3301-3376.

== See also ==
- Düsseldorf Stadtbahn
- Rhine-Ruhr S-Bahn
- Rhein-Ruhr Stadtbahn
- Verkehrsverbund Rhein-Ruhr
- List of town tramway systems in Germany
- Trams in Germany
