= Rheinbahn =

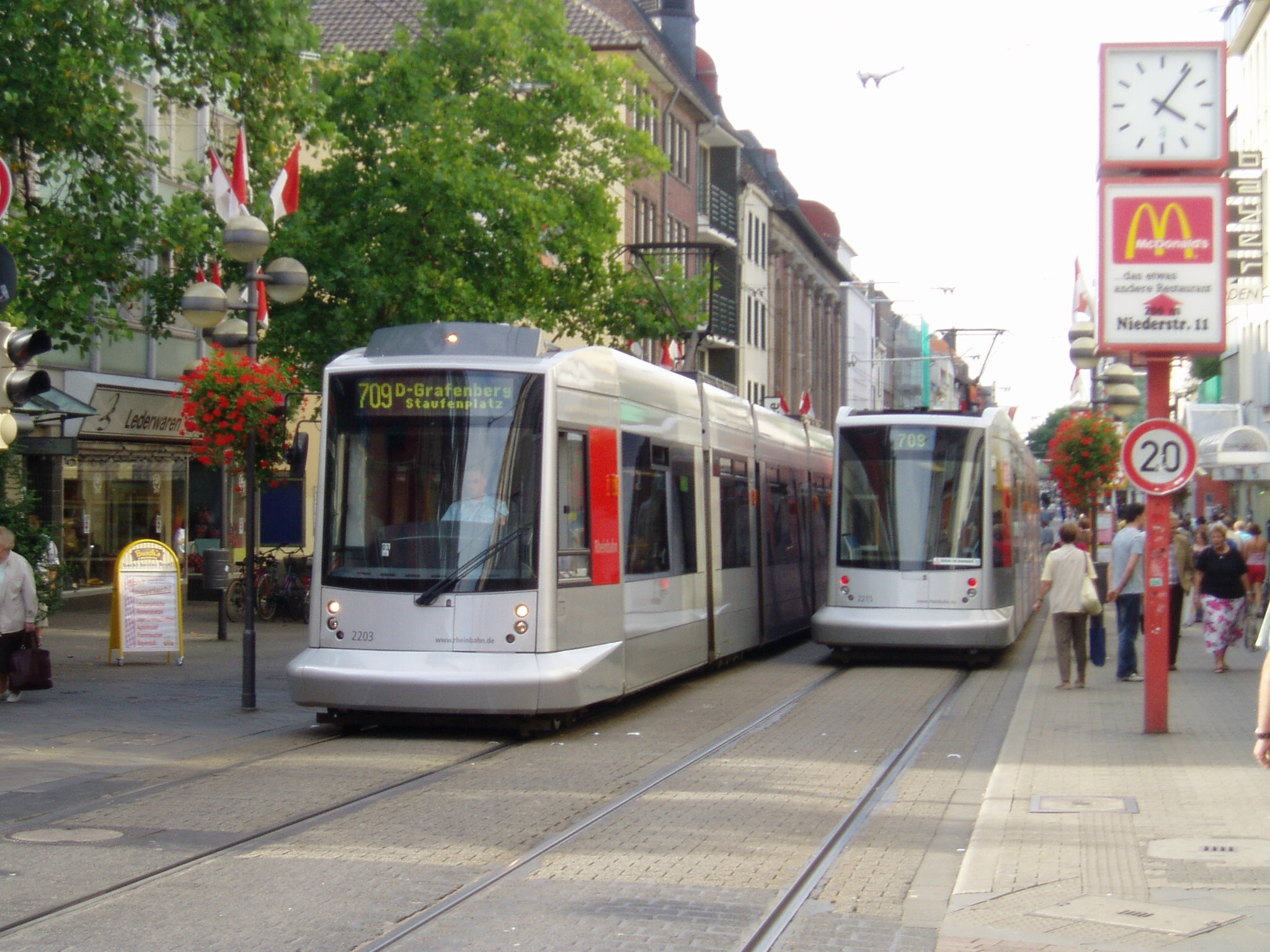
Rheinbahn AG
Information
Head offices	Lierenfelder Strasse 42; 40231 Düsseldorf www.rheinbahn.de
Ownership	5% – City of Düsseldorf; 95% – Düsseldorfer Stadtwerke Gesellschaft für Beteiligungen mbH
Transport association	Verkehrsverbund Rhein-Ruhr
Passengers	210 million / year
Gauge	1,435 mm (4 ft 8 1/2 in) standard gauge
Lines
Stadtbahn lines	11 (2017)
Tramway lines	7 (2017)
Bus lines	92 (2017)
Vehicles
Stadtbahn and tram (2017)	201 Stadtbahn cars 99 trams
Omnibus (2017)	422

Rheinbahn is a German public transport operator operating in Düsseldorf, Meerbusch and Kreis Mettmann. Its network consists of the Düsseldorf Stadtbahn, a network of 11 Stadtbahn (light rail) lines which are integrated in the Rhine-Ruhr Stadtbahn network, as well as Düsseldorf's tram system and 92 bus lines. The total rail network length was 155.2 kilometres (96.4 mi) in 2021. In 2004, Rheinbahn transported 690,000 passengers per day.

== Areas served ==
Two Stadtbahn lines are former light railway lines and connect to the cities of Duisburg (D-Bahn, U79) and Krefeld via Meerbusch (K-Bahn, U70/U76).

The neighbouring city of Neuss is connected to the Rheinbahn network by Stadtbahn line U75 and tram line 709. The neighbouring city of Ratingen is connected by Stadtbahn line U72.

Rheinbahn's bus lines cover Düsseldorf, Meerbusch and most parts of Kreis Mettmann.

== Organisation ==
Rheinbahn is a member of the Verkehrsverbund Rhein-Ruhr (VRR), the public transport association covering the area of the Rhine-Ruhr megalopolis.

== Lifetime contracts issue ==
Between 1980 and 2001, Rheinbahn issued employment contracts which failed to set an end for the salary payments, resulting in these employees receiving their salaries until their deaths. Although the company indicated that it was attempting to resolve this contractual oversight amicably, this strategy relied entirely on the agreement and goodwill of each employee, as the contracts were considered legally watertight. As of 2019, 37 of these contracts were still in active effect. Rheinbahn spokesman Georg Schumacher stated that over 100 such contracts had been issued in total. According to the Munich-based tabloid TZ, several of these contracts are for senior managers who earn in the region of €8,000 per month.

== See also ==
- List of rapid transit systems
- Düsseldorf Stadtbahn
- Trams in Düsseldorf
