= Düsseldorf Hauptbahnhof =

Main railway station of Düsseldorf

Düsseldorf Hbf
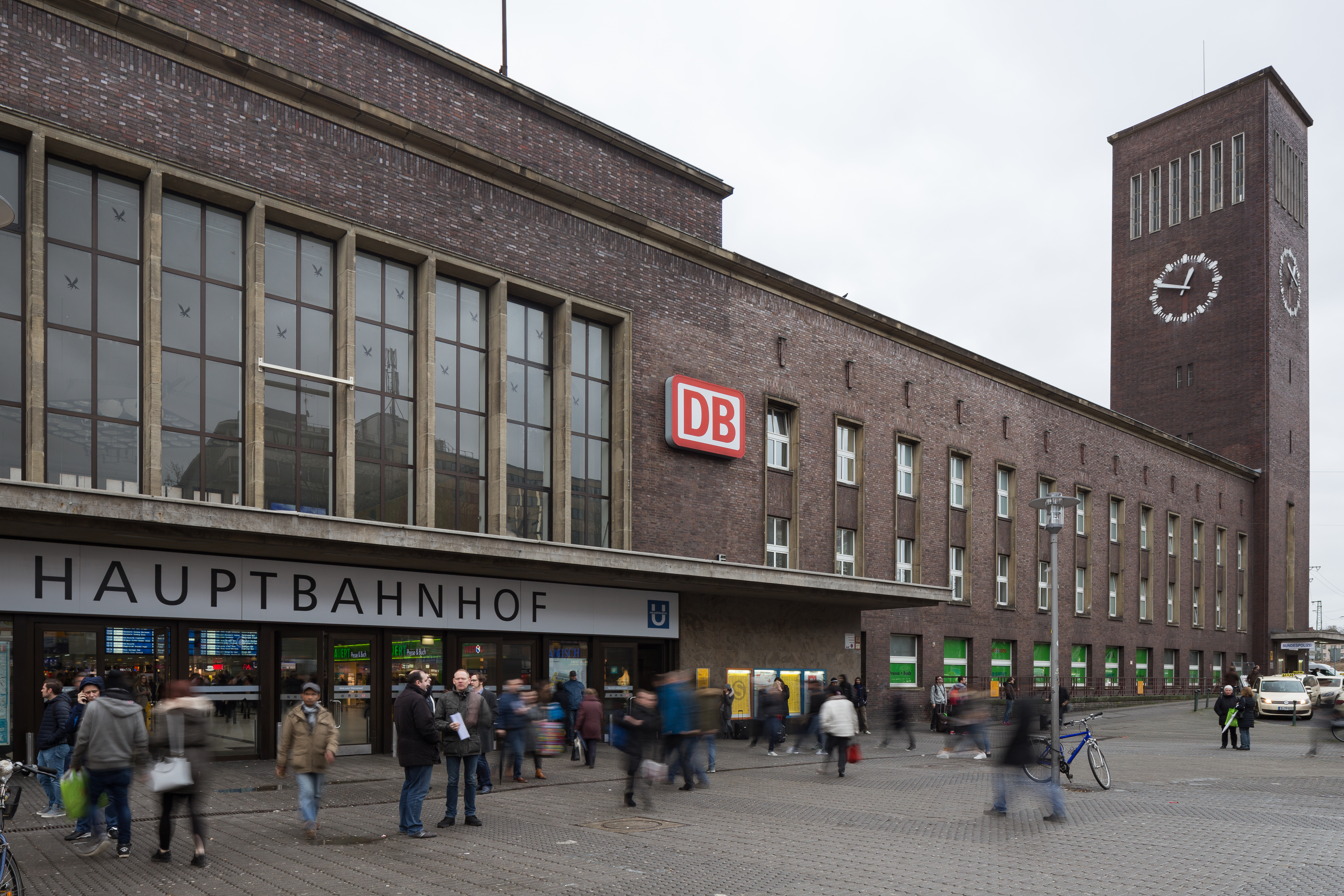
- Entrance hall of station

General information
- Location: Konrad-Adenauer-Platz 14, 40210 Düsseldorf, North Rhine-Westphalia; Germany
- Coordinates: 51°13′13″N 6°47′34″E
- Owner: Deutsche Bahn
- Operator: DB InfraGO
- Lines: Cologne–Duisburg; Düsseldorf–Elberfeld; Mönchengladbach–Düsseldorf
- Platforms: 16 rail; 4 tram; 4 Stadtbahn

Construction
- Accessible: Yes
- Architect: Krüger and Eduard Behne
- Architectural style: New Objectivity

Other information
- Station code: 1401
- DS100 code: KD
- Category: 1
- Fare zone: VRR: 430; VRS: 1430 (VRR transitional zone)
- Website: www.bahnhof.de

History
- Opened: 1891 (PSE); 1936 (DRG)
Services
Preceding station	Eurostar	Following station
Köln Hbf towards Paris-Nord	Eurostar	Düsseldorf Airport towards Dortmund Hbf
Preceding station	DB Fernverkehr	Following station
Köln Hbf towards Passau Hbf	ICE 1 Sprinter	Duisburg Hbf towards Hamburg-Altona
Köln Hbf Terminus	ICE 10	Düsseldorf Airport towards Berlin Ostbahnhof
Köln Hbf towards Aachen Hbf	ICE 14	Duisburg Hbf towards Berlin Ostbahnhof
Köln Hbf towards Köln Hbf	ICE 33	Duisburg Hbf towards Westerland (Sylt)
Köln Hbf Terminus	IC 35	Duisburg Hbf towards Emden Außenhafen or Norddeich Mole
Köln Messe/Deutz towards München Hbf or Garmisch-Partenkirchen	ICE 41	Duisburg Hbf towards Dortmund Hbf or Essen Hbf
Köln Hbf towards München Hbf	ICE 42	Duisburg Hbf towards Hamburg-Altona or Dortmund Hbf
Köln Hbf towards Basel SBB	ICE 43	Duisburg Hbf towards Hamburg-Altona
Köln Messe/Deutz towards Dortmund Hbf	ICE 47	Duisburg Hbf towards München Hbf
Köln Hbf Terminus	IC 51	Düsseldorf Flughafen towards Gera Hbf
Köln Hbf towards Oberstdorf	IC 55 Allgäu	Duisburg Hbf towards Dortmund Hbf
Köln Messe/Deutz towards Graz Hbf	ICE 62	Duisburg Hbf towards Dortmund Hbf
Köln Messe/Deutz towards Innsbruck Hbf	ICE 62 Bodensee	Duisburg Hbf towards Dortmund Hbf
Köln Hbf towards Frankfurt (Main) Hbf	ICE 78	Duisburg Hbf towards Amsterdam Centraal
Köln Messe/Deutz towards München Hbf	ICE 78	Duisburg Hbf towards Amsterdam Centraal
Köln Hbf towards Wien Hbf	ICE 91	Duisburg Hbf towards Dortmund Hbf
Preceding station	ÖBB	Following station
Köln Messe/Deutz towards Innsbruck Hbf or Wien Hbf	Nightjet	Duisburg Hbf towards Amsterdam Centraal
Köln Hbf towards Zürich HB	Nightjet	Duisburg Hbf towards Amsterdam Centraal
Preceding station		Following station
Köln Hbf Terminus	FLX 20	Duisburg Hbf towards Hamburg Hbf
Köln Hbf towards Aachen Hbf	FLX 30	Duisburg Hbf towards Leipzig Hbf
Preceding station	National Express Germany	Following station
Düsseldorf-Benrath towards Aachen Hbf	RE 1 (NRW-Express)	Düsseldorf Airport towards Hamm (Westf) Hbf
Düsseldorf-Bilk towards Aachen Hbf	RE 4 (Wupper-Express)	Wuppertal-Vohwinkel towards Dortmund Hbf
Düsseldorf-Benrath towards Koblenz Hbf	RE 5 (Rhein-Express)	Düsseldorf Airport towards Wesel
Düsseldorf-Bilk towards Cologne/Bonn Airport	RE 6 (Rhein-Weser-Express)	Düsseldorf Airport towards Minden
Terminus	RE 11 (Rhein-Hellweg-Express)	Düsseldorf Airport towards Kassel-Wilhelmshöhe
Preceding station	DB Regio NRW	Following station
Terminus	RE 2	Düsseldorf Airport towards Osnabrück Hbf
Preceding station		Following station
Terminus	RE 3	Düsseldorf Airport towards Hamm (Westf) Hbf
Düsseldorf-Bilk towards Venlo	RE 13	Wuppertal-Vohwinkel towards Hamm (Westf) Hbf
Preceding station	NordWestBahn	Following station
Düsseldorf-Bilk towards Kleve	RE 10	Terminus
Preceding station	Regiobahn	Following station
Düsseldorf-Eller Mitte towards Remscheid-Lennep	RE 47	Terminus
Preceding station	VIAS	Following station
Terminus	RE 19	Düsseldorf Airport towards Arnhem Centraal or Bocholt
Düsseldorf-Bilk towards Bedburg	RB 39	Terminus
Preceding station	Rhine-Ruhr S-Bahn	Following station
Düsseldorf Volksgarten towards Solingen Hbf	S1	Düsseldorf-Wehrhahn towards Dortmund Hbf
Düsseldorf Volksgarten towards Köln-Nippes	S6	Düsseldorf-Wehrhahn towards Essen Hbf
Düsseldorf-Friedrichstadt towards Mönchengladbach Hbf	S8	Düsseldorf-Flingern towards Hagen Hbf
Düsseldorf-Friedrichstadt towards Kaarster See	S28	Düsseldorf-Flingern towards Wuppertal Hbf
Düsseldorf Volksgarten towards Langenfeld	S68	Düsseldorf-Wehrhahn towards Wuppertal-Vohwinkel
Preceding station	Cologne S-Bahn	Following station
Düsseldorf-Friedrichstadt towards Bergisch Gladbach	S11	Düsseldorf-Wehrhahn towards Düsseldorf Airport Terminal
Preceding station	Rhine-Ruhr Stadtbahn	Following station
Oststraße towards Krefeld Rheinstraße	U70	Terminus
Oststraße towards Meerbusch-Görgesheide	U74	Oberbilker Markt/Warschauer Straße towards Holthausen
Oststraße towards Neuss Hbf	U75	Handelszentrum/Moskauer Straße towards Eller Vennhauser Allee
Oststraße towards Krefeld Rheinstraße	U76	Terminus
Oststraße towards Am Seestern	U77	Oberbilker Markt/Warschauer Straße towards Holthausen
Oststraße towards Merkur Spiel-Arena/Messe Nord	U78	Terminus
Oststraße towards Duisburg-Meiderich Süd	U79	Oberbilker Markt/Warschauer Straße towards Universität Ost/Botanischer Garten
Location

Düsseldorf Hauptbahnhof is the main railway station of Düsseldorf, the state capital of North Rhine-Westphalia, Germany.

== History ==
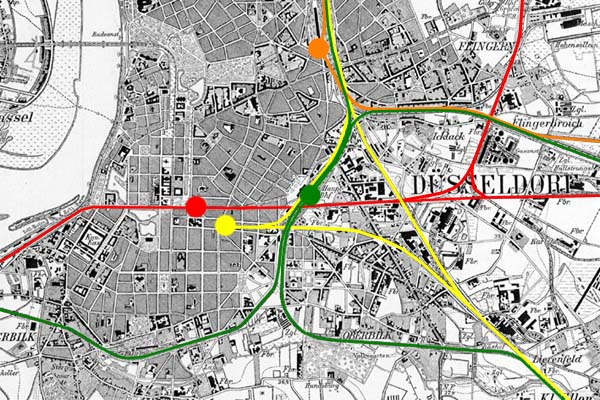
Realignment of the lines, former BME line in red, former CME lines in yellow, former RhE line in orange, new combined lines in green

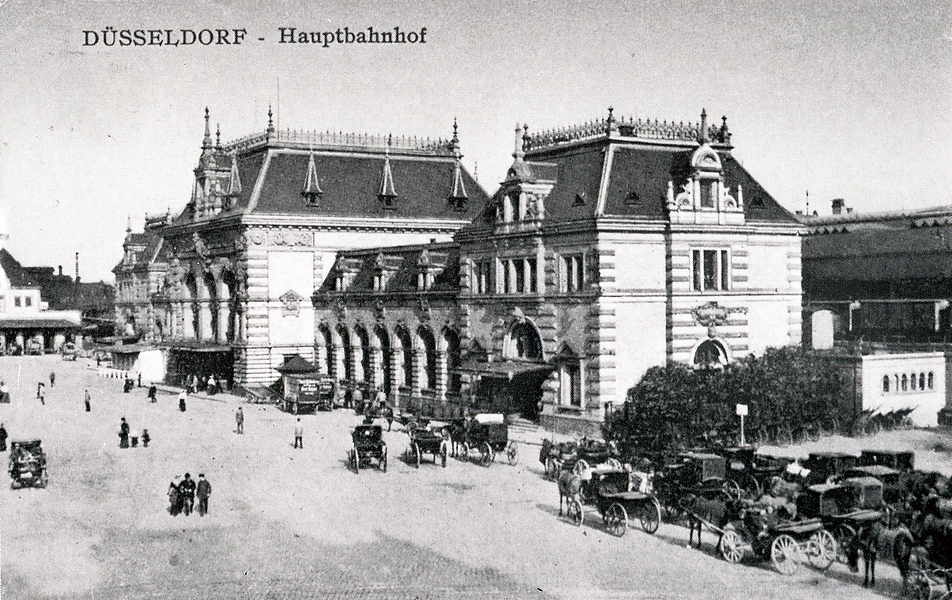
Original station in 1900

The station was opened on 1 October 1891. It replaced the three following stations:

- the Bergisch-Märkische station of the Bergisch-Märkische Railway Company (BME), originally opened by the Düsseldorf-Elberfeld Railway Company in 1838 in the area that is now Graf-Adolf-Platz as a through station on the company's east–west line from Elberfeld to its station at Rheinknie.
- the Cologne-Minden station which the Cologne-Minden Railway Company (CME) opened in 1845 southeast of the BME station as a terminus to which branches were built from the company's north–south Cologne–Duisburg main line, and
- the Rhenish station built by the Rhenish Railway Company (RhE) in 1877 in Düsseldorf-Pempelfort at the end of a branch line from its north–south Troisdorf–Mülheim-Speldorf line. The branch line was the first section of a line to Dortmund, which two years later was completed as far as Mettmann.

Both the Bergisch-Märkische and the Cologne-Minden stations were on the southern edge of the city and were in the way of the construction of Friedrichstadt. The wish to clear the way for the new development was a reason to build a new station in addition to the desire to bring together the stations and lines following the nationalisation of the railway companies of Rhineland-Westphalia between 1879 and 1882.

=== Construction of station building in the 1930s ===
The original Hauptbahnhof was built in the Wilhelmine style. After three decades it had become too small and its style had become unfashionable. In November 1930, eight designs were submitted to the public as part of a competition to redesign the station. The station building was built from 1932 to 1936 conforming to a design dictated by the Reichsbahn directorate of Wuppertal and its architects, Krüger and Eduard Behne. It features a notable clock tower.

The station underwent major reconstruction in the 1980s, finishing in 1985, when the Stadtbahn lines passing under the station were opened. This reconstruction involved the remodeling of the old ticket offices into a food court, the installation of lifts and the opening of the station toward the city borough of Oberbilk, where, at the western exit of the station, new office buildings were erected on the site of a former steel works. The former 1st class waiting room has been remodeled into a hotel and a discothèque.

Some minor changes were carried out in the year 2005; the old toilets from 1985 were torn out to make room for a fast food restaurant, a small 1st class lounge was installed in the northern passenger tunnel also. The dated ceilings and information systems in the passenger tunnels are scheduled for replacement also, as they do not meet current fire protection standards.

== Operational usage ==
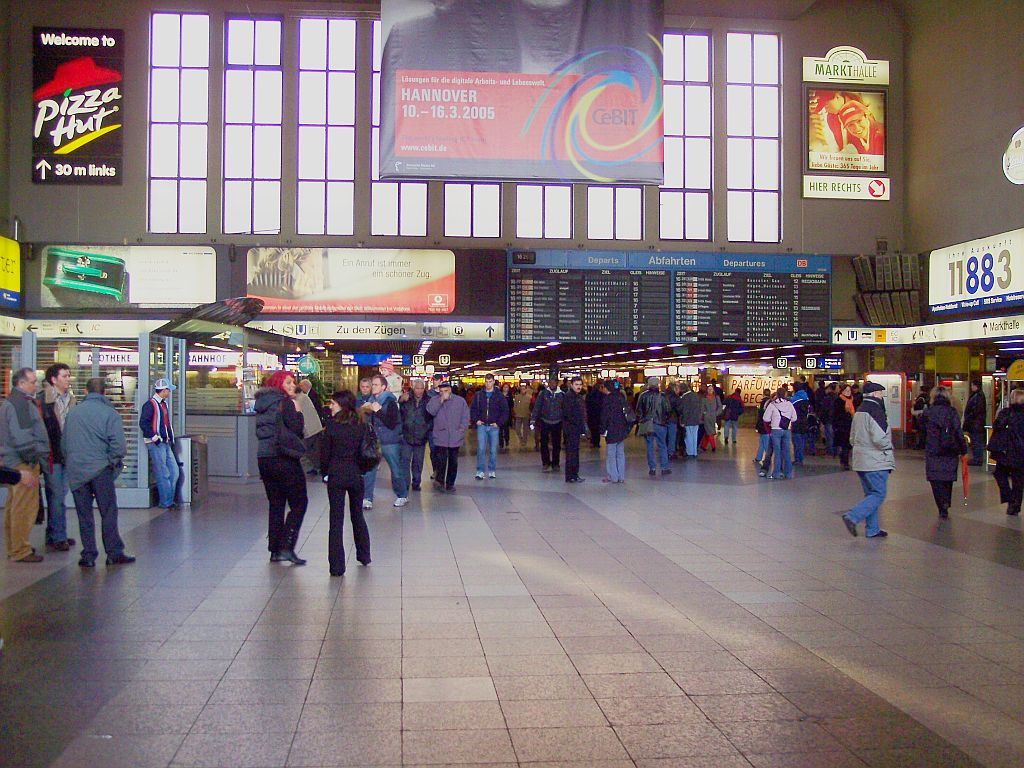
Station hall

The station is frequented by roughly a quarter million passengers per day and is therefore Germany's tenth busiest station.

All modes of rail transport are offered on the 20 main line tracks (16 platforms currently in use), including InterCityExpress, InterCity, EuroCity trains for long-distance travel, Austrian operated ÖBB Nightjet overnight trains, motorail trains as well as RegionalExpress, RegionalBahn and S-Bahn services for regional distribution. The station is integrated into the Rhein-Ruhr S-Bahn network and local traffic operates under the Verkehrsverbund Rhein-Ruhr transport association. The subterranean station, operated by Rheinbahn, has 4 tracks that are part of the Stadtbahn lines of Düsseldorf. The 6 tramway stops in front of the station connect the Hauptbahnhof to the local tram network, also operated by Rheinbahn.

=== Long-distance ===
In the 2026 timetable, the following long-distance services stopped at the station:

Line	Route		Frequency
ICE 1	Hamburg-Altona – Hamburg – Essen – Duisburg – Düsseldorf – Cologne – Bonn – Koblenz – Mainz – Frankfurt Airport – Frankfurt – Würzburg – Nuremberg – Regensburg – Passau		Three times a day
ICE 10	Berlin Ostbahnhof – Berlin – (Wolfsburg –) Hannover – Bielefeld – Hamm – Dortmund – Bochum – Essen – Duisburg – Düsseldorf Airport – Düsseldorf (– Cologne)		Hourly
ICE 33	Westerland – Niebüll – Itzehoe – Hamburg – Bremen – Osnabrück – Münster – Gelsenkirchen – Essen – Duisburg – Düsseldorf – Cologne		1 train pair
IC 35	Norddeich Mole – Emden – Münster – Recklinghausen – Gelsenkirchen – Oberhausen – Duisburg – Düsseldorf – Cologne		Every 2 hours
IC 37	Düsseldorf – Cologne – Bonn – Koblenz – Wittlich – Trier – Luxembourg		1 train pair
ICE 41	(Dortmund –) Essen – Duisburg – Düsseldorf – Köln Messe/Deutz – Frankfurt Airport – Frankfurt – Würzburg – Nuremberg – Munich		Hourly
ICE 42	Hamburg-Altona – Hamburg – Bremen – Münster – Dortmund – Essen – Duisburg – Düsseldorf – Cologne – Siegburg/Bonn – Frankfurt Flughafen – Mannheim – Stuttgart – Munich		Every 2 hours
ICE 43	Hamburg-Altona – Hamburg – Bremen – Osnabrück – Münster – Dortmund – Essen – Düsseldorf – Cologne – Siegburg/Bonn – Frankfurt Airport – Mannheim – Karlsruhe – Freiburg – Basel		Some trains
ICE 47	Dortmund – Essen – Duisburg – Düsseldorf – Köln Messe/Deutz – Frankfurt Airport – Mannheim – Stuttgart		Every 2 hours
IC 51	Gera – Jena-Göschwitz – Weimar – Erfurt – Eisenach – Kassel – Dortmund – Düsseldorf (– Cologne)		2 train pairs
IC 55	Dortmund – Essen – Duisburg – Düsseldorf – Cologne – Bonn – Koblenz – Mainz – Mannheim – Heidelberg – Stuttgart – Ulm – Memmingen – Kempten – Oberstdorf		1 train pair
ICE 62	Münster – Wanne-Eickel – Gelsenkirchen – Oberhausen – Duisburg – Düsseldorf – Köln Messe/Deutz – Frankfurt Airport – Mannheim – Stuttgart – Ulm – Augsburg – Munich – Salzburg – Villach – Klagenfurt – Graz		1 train pair
ICE 62	Dortmund – Bochum – Essen – Duisburg – Düsseldorf – Köln Messe/Deutz – Frankfurt Airport – Mannheim – Heidelberg – Stuttgart – Ulm – Friedrichshafen Stadt – Lindau-Reutin – Bregenz – St. Anton – Innsbruck		1 train pair
ICE 78	Amsterdam – Utrecht – Arnhem – Oberhausen – Duisburg – Düsseldorf – Cologne – Frankfurt Airport – Frankfurt		Every 2 hours
ICE 91	Dortmund – Essen – Duisburg – Düsseldorf – Cologne – Bonn – Koblenz – Frankfurt Airport – Frankfurt – Würzburg – Nuremberg – Passau – Vienna – Vienna Airport		Some trains
Eurostar	Dortmund – Essen – Duisburg – (Düsseldorf Airport –) Düsseldorf – Cologne – Aachen – Liège-Guillemins – Brussels – Paris-Nord		Some trains
FLX 20	Hamburg Hbf – Hamburg-Harburg – Osnabrück – Münster – Gelsenkirchen – Essen – Duisburg – Düsseldorf – Cologne		1-3 train pairs
FLX 30	Leipzig – Lutherstadt Wittenberg – Berlin Südkreuz – Berlin Hbf – Berlin-Spandau – Hannover – Bielefeld – Dortmund – Essen – Duisburg – Düsseldorf – Cologne – Aachen		1-2 train pairs
Nightjet	Amsterdam – Utrecht – Arnhem – Düsseldorf – Cologne Messe/Deutz – Nuremberg –	Regensburg – Passau – Wels – Linz – St. Pölten – Vienna	1 train pair
Nightjet	Amsterdam – Utrecht – Arnhem – Düsseldorf – Cologne Messe/Deutz – Nuremberg –	Augsburg – Munich – Kufstein – Innsbruck	1 train pair
Nightjet	Amsterdam – Utrecht – Arnhem – Düsseldorf – Cologne – Freiburg – Basel – Zürich		1 train pair

=== Regional services ===
In the 2026 timetable, the following regional services stopped at the station:

Line	Route	Frequency
RE 1 NRW-Express	Aachen – Eschweiler – Düren – Horrem – Cologne – Düsseldorf Hbf – Düsseldorf Airport – Duisburg – Mülheim – Essen – Bochum – Dortmund – Hamm	60 min
RE 2 Rhein-Haard-Express	Düsseldorf Hbf – Düsseldorf Airport – Duisburg – Mülheim – Essen – Gelsenkirchen – Recklinghausen – Münster – Osnabrück	60 min
RE 3 Rhein-Emscher-Express	Düsseldorf Hbf – Duisburg – Oberhausen – Wanne-Eickel – Gelsenkirchen – Herne – Dortmund – Hamm	60 min
RE 4 Wupper-Express	Aachen – Mönchengladbach – Düsseldorf Hbf – Wuppertal – Hagen – Dortmund	60 min
RE 5 Rhein-Express	Wesel – Duisburg – Düsseldorf Airport – Düsseldorf Hbf – Cologne – Bonn – Remagen – Andernach – Koblenz	60 min
RE 6 Rhein-Weser-Express	Minden – Herford – Bielefeld – Hamm – Dortmund – Essen – Mülheim – Duisburg – Düsseldorf Airport – Düsseldorf Hbf – Neuss – Cologne – Cologne/Bonn Airport	60 min
RE 10; Niers-Express	Düsseldorf Hbf – Krefeld – Geldern – Kleve	30 min
RE 11; Rhein-Hellweg-Express	Düsseldorf Hbf – Düsseldorf Airport – Duisburg – Mülheim – Essen – Dortmund – Hamm – Paderborn (– Kassel-Wilhelmshöhe)	60 min
RE 13; Maas-Wupper-Express	Venlo – Mönchengladbach – Düsseldorf Hbf – Wuppertal – Hagen – Hamm	60 min
RE 19; Rhein-IJssel-Express	Arnhem – Emmerich – Wesel – Oberhausen – Duisburg – Düsseldorf Airport – Düsseldorf Hbf	60 min
RB 39; Düssel-Erft-Bahn	(Düsseldorf Hbf (1) –) Neuss (2) – Grevenbroich (3) (– Bedburg (4))	60 min (1–2), 30 min (2–3), 60 min (3–4)
RE 47; Düssel-Wupper-Express	Düsseldorf Hbf – Düsseldorf-Eller Mitte – Hilden – Solingen Hbf – Solingen Mitte – Remscheid – Remscheid-Lennep	60 min (Currently not in service)
S1	Dortmund (1) – Bochum – Essen (2) – Mülheim – Duisburg – Düsseldorf Airport – Düsseldorf Hbf (3) – Hilden – Solingen Hbf (4)	15 min (1–2), 30 min (2–3), 20 min (3–4)
S6	Köln-Nippes – Cologne – Langenfeld – Düsseldorf Hbf – Ratingen Ost – Essen	20 min
S8	Mönchengladbach – Neuss – Düsseldorf Hbf – Wuppertal – Wuppertal-Oberbarmen – Gevelsberg – Hagen	20 min
S11	Düsseldorf Flughafen Terminal – Düsseldorf Hbf – Neuss – Dormagen – Cologne – Bergisch Gladbach	20 min
S28	Kaarster See – Neuss – Düsseldorf Hbf – Mettmann Stadtwald (– Wuppertal Hbf)	20 min
S68	Langenfeld – Düsseldorf Hbf – Wuppertal-Vohwinkel	Some peak services (Currently not in service)

=== Stadtbahn services ===
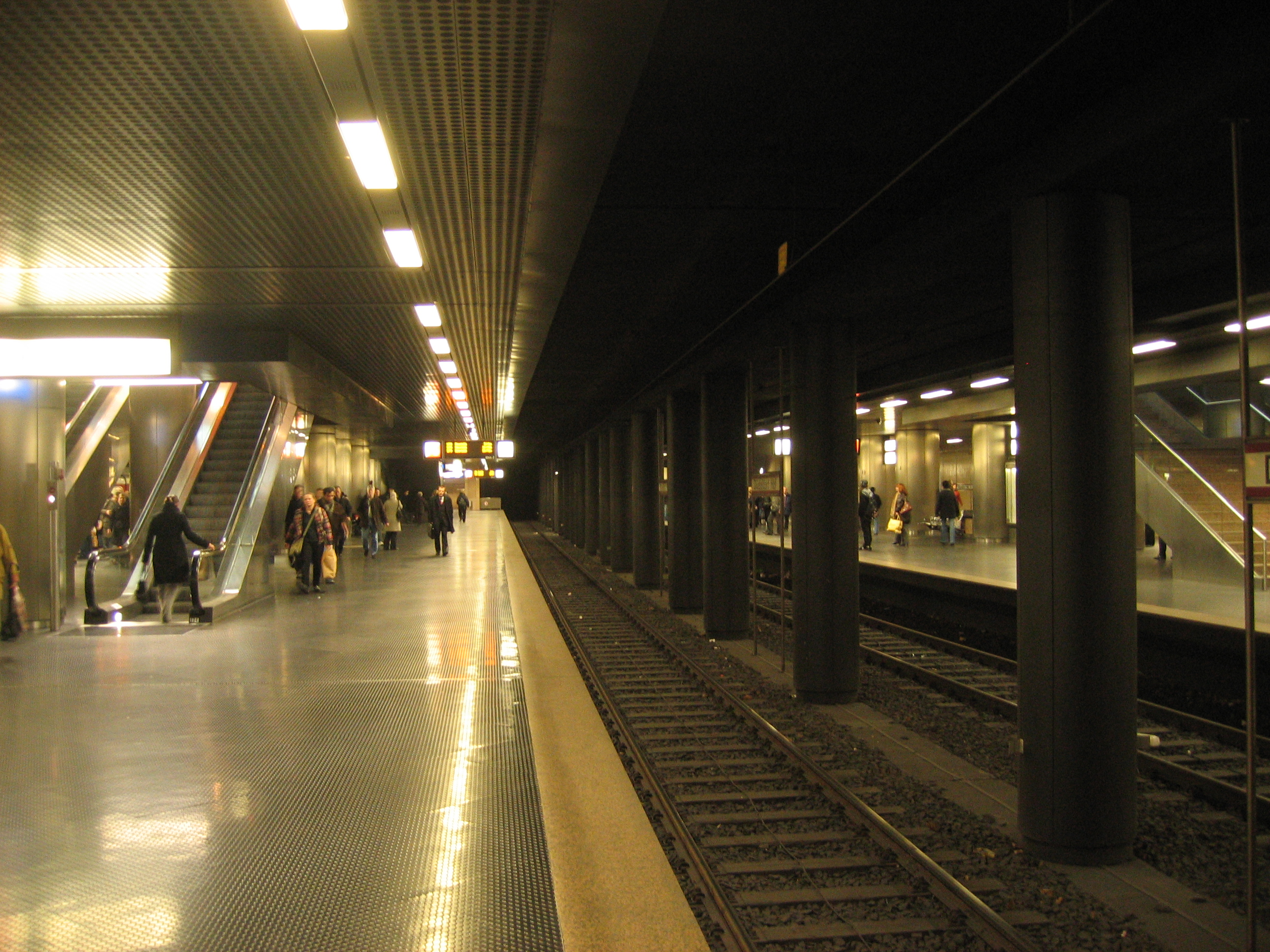
Düsseldorf Hauptbahnhof station of Stadtbahn Düsseldorf

The following Rhine-Ruhr Stadtbahn services stop at Düsseldorf Hauptbahnhof:

- U70
- U75
- U76
- U77
- U78
- U79

In addition, Düsseldorf Hauptbahnhof is also served by Tram lines 704, 707, 708 and 709.

== See also ==
- Rail transport in Germany
