= Düsseldorf Stadtbahn =

Light rail in Düsseldorf, Germany

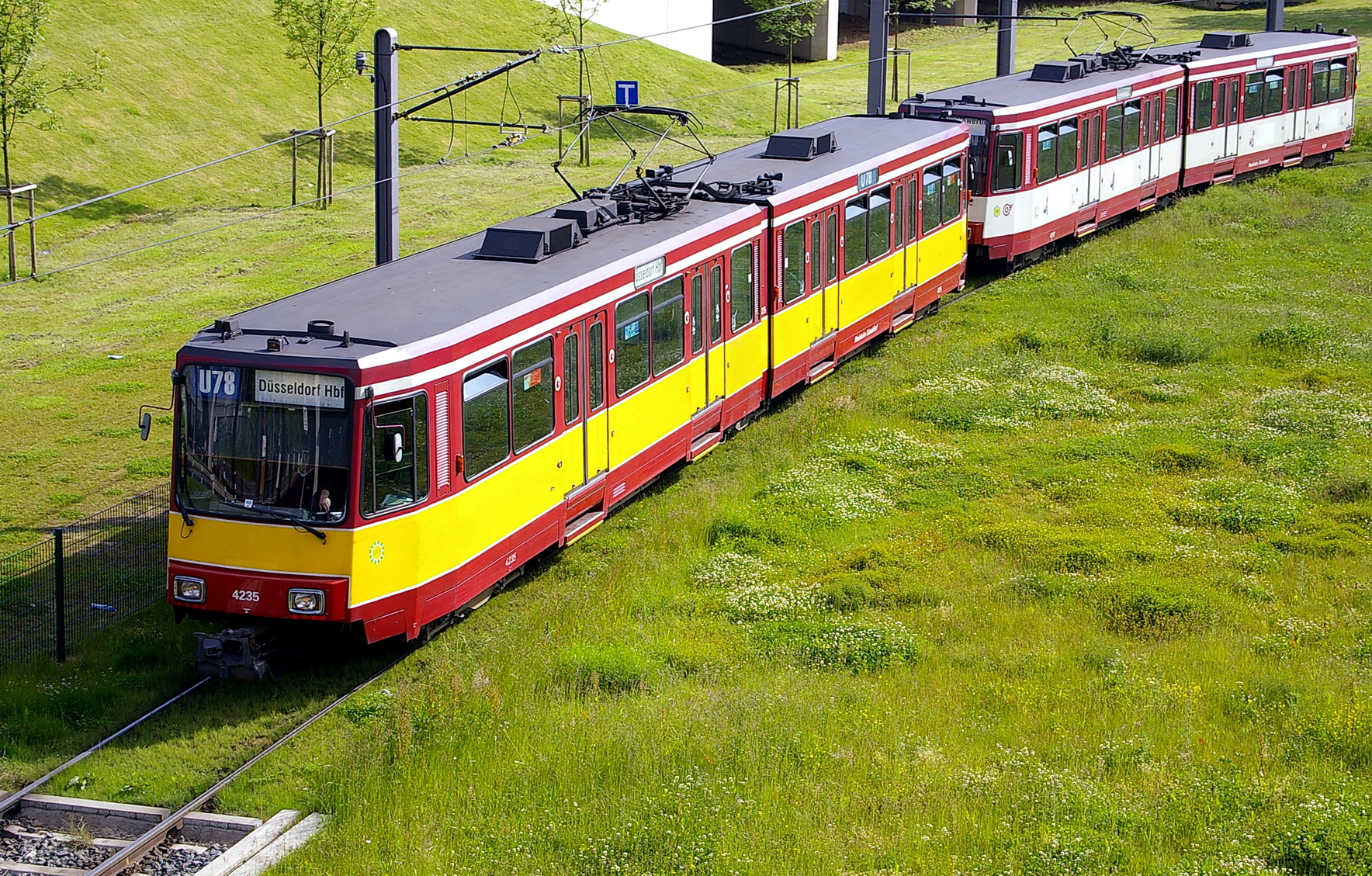

Overview
- Locale: Düsseldorf, Meerbusch, Krefeld, Neuss, Duisburg and Ratingen, North Rhine-Westphalia, Germany
- Transit type: Light rail (Stadtbahn)
- Number of lines: 12
- Line number: U70, U71, U72, U73, U75, U76, U77, U78, U79, U80, U81, U83
- Number of stations: 161 (including 22 underground stations. Düsseldorf 125, Duisburg: 20, Meerbusch: 7, Ratingen: 6, Krefeld: 5, Neuss: 3)
- Daily ridership: 550,000
- Annual ridership: 173 million (2023)
- Website: Rheinbahn (in English)

Operation
- Began operation: 6 August 1988
- Operator: Rheinbahn
- Number of vehicles: 227

Technical
- System length: 68.5 km (42.6 mi)
- Track gauge: 1,435 mm (4 ft 8 1/2 in)
System map
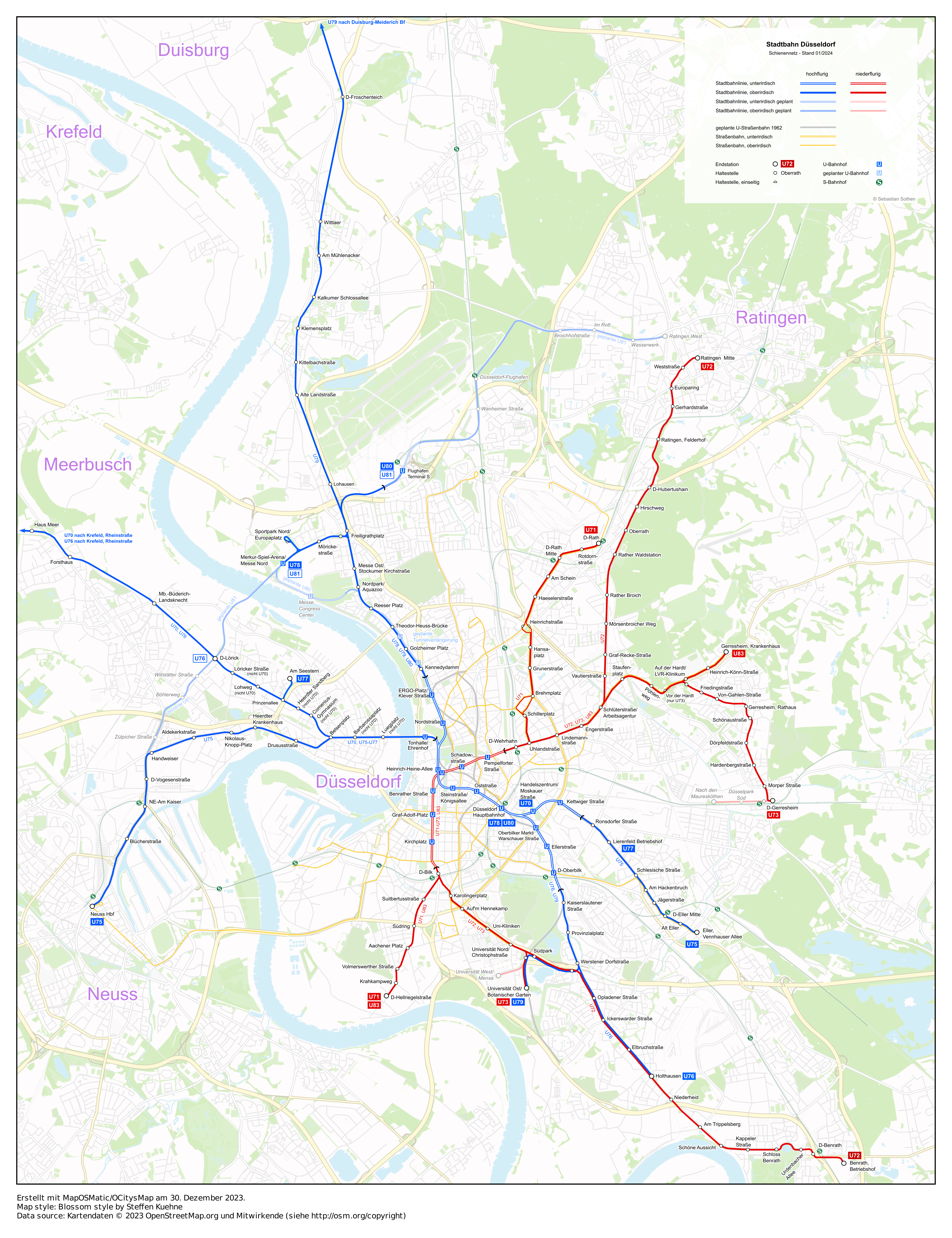

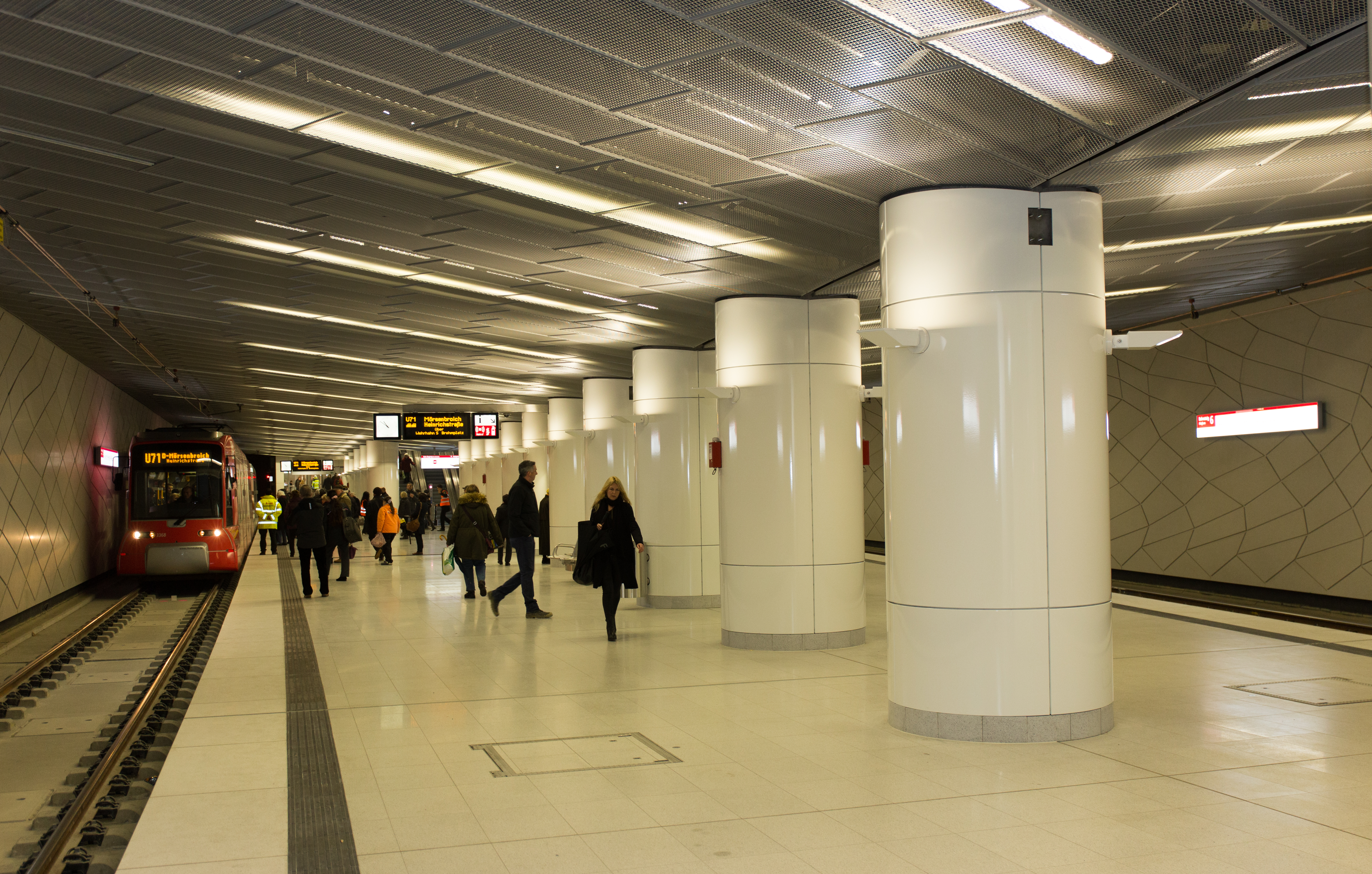
The Heinrich-Heine-Allee subway station

The Düsseldorf Stadtbahn (German: Stadtbahn Düsseldorf) is a Stadtbahn ("city train", i.e. urban light rail system) serving Düsseldorf and the surrounding areas of the Rhine-Ruhr metropolitan region of the German state of North Rhine-Westphalia. Together with the S-Bahn Rhein-Ruhr, the Stadtbahn forms the backbone of the local public transport system in the city, which is supplemented by other tram and bus lines. On some lines, the light rail operates beyond the city limits of Düsseldorf to the neighboring cities of Neuss, Meerbusch, Krefeld, Duisburg and Ratingen.

The Düsseldorf network is part of the Rhine-Ruhr light rail system. After the first tunnel section was opened in 1981, the entire public transport system on the heavily frequented axis between the old town and the main station has been able to operate underground since 1988, when the inner-city tunnel was opened. The high-floor operations started here, subsequently leading to a separation of the rail-bound public transport into a light rail and a tram network.

With the start of service on the Wehrhahn line on February 21, 2016, the light rail network grew to a route length of 85.5 and a line length of 188.2 kilometers; Rheinbahn's 2020 annual report lists the route length of the light rail network as 98.7 kilometers. The eleven - instead of previously seven - lines are operated using 135 Rheinbahn vehicles. In addition to these, operation of the U79 is shared between the Rheinbahn and the neighboring Duisburger Verkehrsgesellschaft (DVG) and their respective rolling stock.

Fares on the network are those of the Rhine-Ruhr Transport Association (Verkehrsverbund Rhein-Ruhr, VRR). This allows for integrated ticketing with the Rhine-Ruhr S-Bahn and several other regional and local transport agencies across the Rhine-Ruhr region.

== History ==
=== Metro plans ===
The original plans of the 1960s envisioned a subway system for Düsseldorf. In 1959, the findings of a special commission formed by the city administration, the police, the Rheinbahn, and the city of Düsseldorf considered a total of 47 kilometers of classic subway network with five lines. According to the drafts, this would have completely replaced the tramway system with only three supplementary bus lines and would have made the streets of the state capital completely adjusted for cars. The idea was to have several streetcar lines divided into different areas. In addition, the streetcar lines would have been integrated into the subway system.

The aim was to have several sections leading to different parts of the city, which would have been bundled into two main lines in the city center. A connection of these was planned at a central subway station at today's Heinrich-Heine-Allee. However, these plans were changed at the behest of the North Rhine-Westphalian state government as financial sponsor, in favor of a light rail system for the entire Rhine-Ruhr area.

== Current lines ==
U70 is a rush-hour-only express line. It operates the same route as the U76, however it does not stop at all stations along the way. U77 is not operated on Sundays or holidays. U81 only operates on selected event and trade fair days.

| Line | Route | Opening | Length (km) | Stations (Underground Station) |
|---|---|---|---|---|
| U70 | Express line: Krefeld, Rheinstraße - Krefeld Hauptbahnhof – Düsseldorf Lörick - Düsseldorf Heinrich-Heine-Allee - Düsseldorf Steinstraße/Königsallee - Düsseldorf Oststraße - Düsseldorf Hauptbahnhof | 1988 | 22.4 | 21 (5) |
| U71 | Düsseldorf Rath S - Düsseldorf Heinrichstrasse – Düsseldorf Wehrhahn (S) – Düsseldorf Heinrich-Heine-Allee – Düsseldorf Bilk (S) – Düsseldorf Hellriegelstraße | 2016 | 20.3 | 25 (6) |
| U72 | Ratingen Mitte – Düsseldorf Wehrhahn (S) – Düsseldorf Heinrich-Heine-Allee – Düsseldorf Bilk (S) – Düsseldorf Südpark - Düsseldorf Holthausen - Düsseldorf Benrath Betriebshof | 2016 | 15.4 | 43 (6) |
| U73 | Düsseldorf Gerresheim (S) – Düsseldorf Wehrhahn (S) – Düsseldorf Heinrich-Heine-Allee – Düsseldorf Bilk (S) – Düsseldorf Südpark - Düsseldorf Universität Ost | 2016 | 20.3 | 29 (6) |
| U75 | Neuss Hauptbahnhof – Düsseldorf Heinrich-Heine-Allee – Düsseldorf Steinstraße/Königsallee – Düsseldorf Oststraße - Düsseldorf Hauptbahnhof - Düsseldorf Lierenfeld Betriebshof - Düsseldorf Vennhauser Allee | 1993 | 15.6 | 28 (6) |
| U76 | Krefeld Rheinstraße - Krefeld Hauptbahnhof - Meerbusch Görgesheide - Düsseldorf Lörick – Düsseldorf Heinrich-Heine-Allee – Düsseldorf Steinstraße/Königsallee – Düsseldorf Oststraße - Düsseldorf Hauptbahnhof – Düsseldorf Holthausen | 1988 | 23.0 | 37 (7) |
| U77 | Düsseldorf Am Seestern – Düsseldorf Heinrich-Heine-Allee – Düsseldorf Steinstraße/Königsallee – Düsseldorf Oststraße - Düsseldorf Hauptbahnhof – Düsseldorf Lierenfeld Betriebshof | 1994 | 11.6 | 16 (6) |
| U78 | Düsseldorf Hauptbahnhof – Düsseldorf Oststraße - Düsseldorf Steinstraße/Königsallee - Düsseldorf Heinrich-Heine-Allee - Düsseldorf Freiligrathplatz - MERKUR SPIEL-Arena/Messe Nord | 1988 | 7.6 | 17 (7) |
| U79 | Düsseldorf Universität Ost/Botanischer Garten – Düsseldorf Hauptbahnhof - Düsseldorf Oststraße - Düsseldorf Steinstraße/Königsallee - Düsseldorf Heinrich-Heine-Allee - Düsseldorf Freiligrathplatz - Düsseldorf Wittlear - Duisburg Grunewald - Duisburg Hauptbahnhof - Duisburg-Meiderich Südbahnhof | 1988 | 41.3 | 50 (15) |
| U80 | Düsseldorf Hauptbahnhof - Düsseldorf Oststraße - Düsseldorf Steinstraße/Königsallee - Düsseldorf Heinrich-Heine-Allee - Düsseldorf Freiligrathplatz – Flughafen Terminal | 2026 | - | 13 (6) |
| U81 | Flughafen Terminal - Düsseldorf Freiligrathplatz - MERKUR SPIEL-Arena/Messe Nord | 2026 | - | 3 (1) |
| U83 | Düsseldorf Gerresheim-Krankenhaus – Düsseldorf Wehrhahn (S) – Düsseldorf Heinrich-Heine-Allee – Düsseldorf Bilk (S) – Düsseldorf Hellriegelstraße | 2016 | 18.3 | 35 (6) |

== Future expansion ==
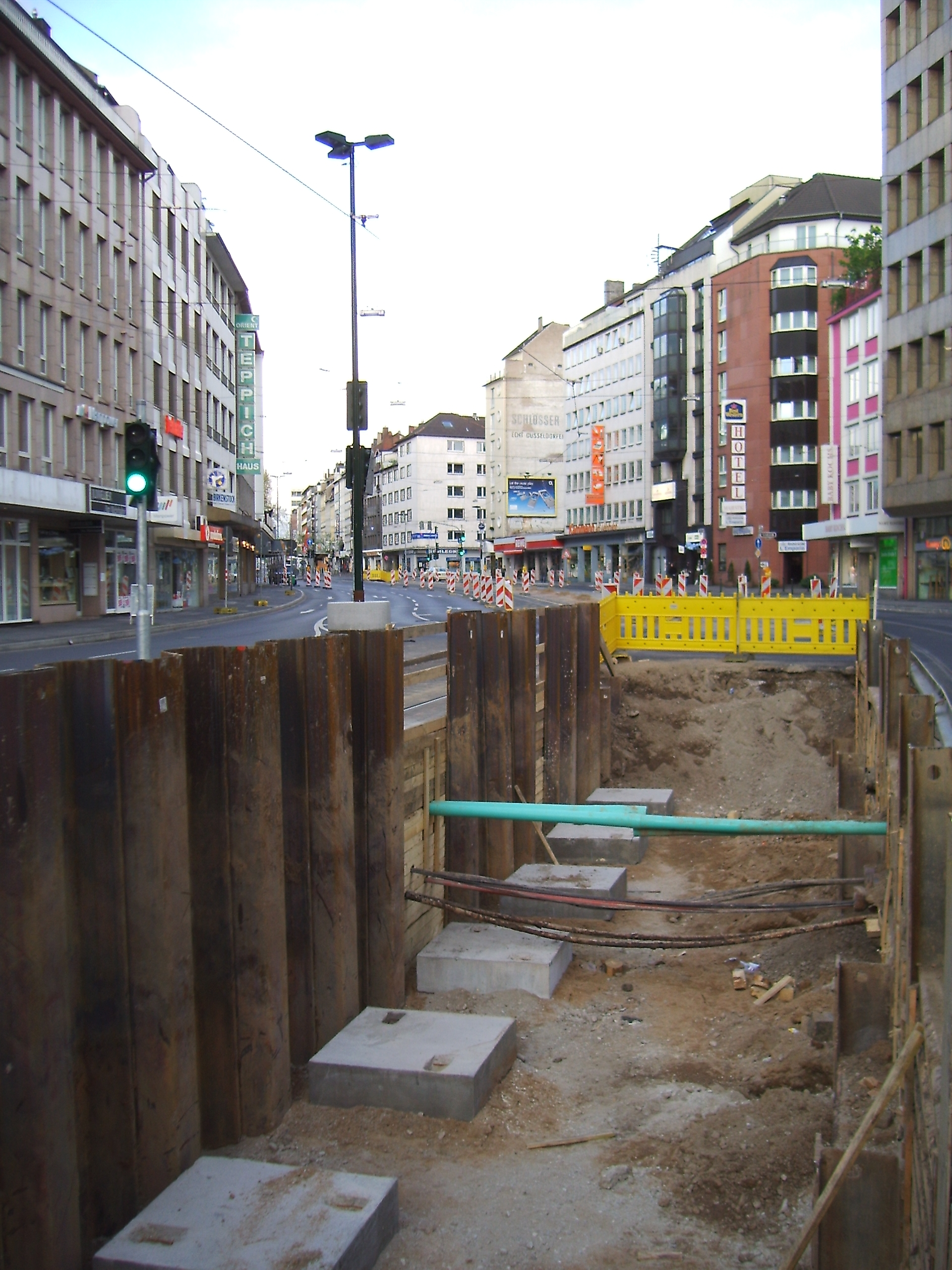
Trench for the new Wehrhahn-Linie; photo from 2008

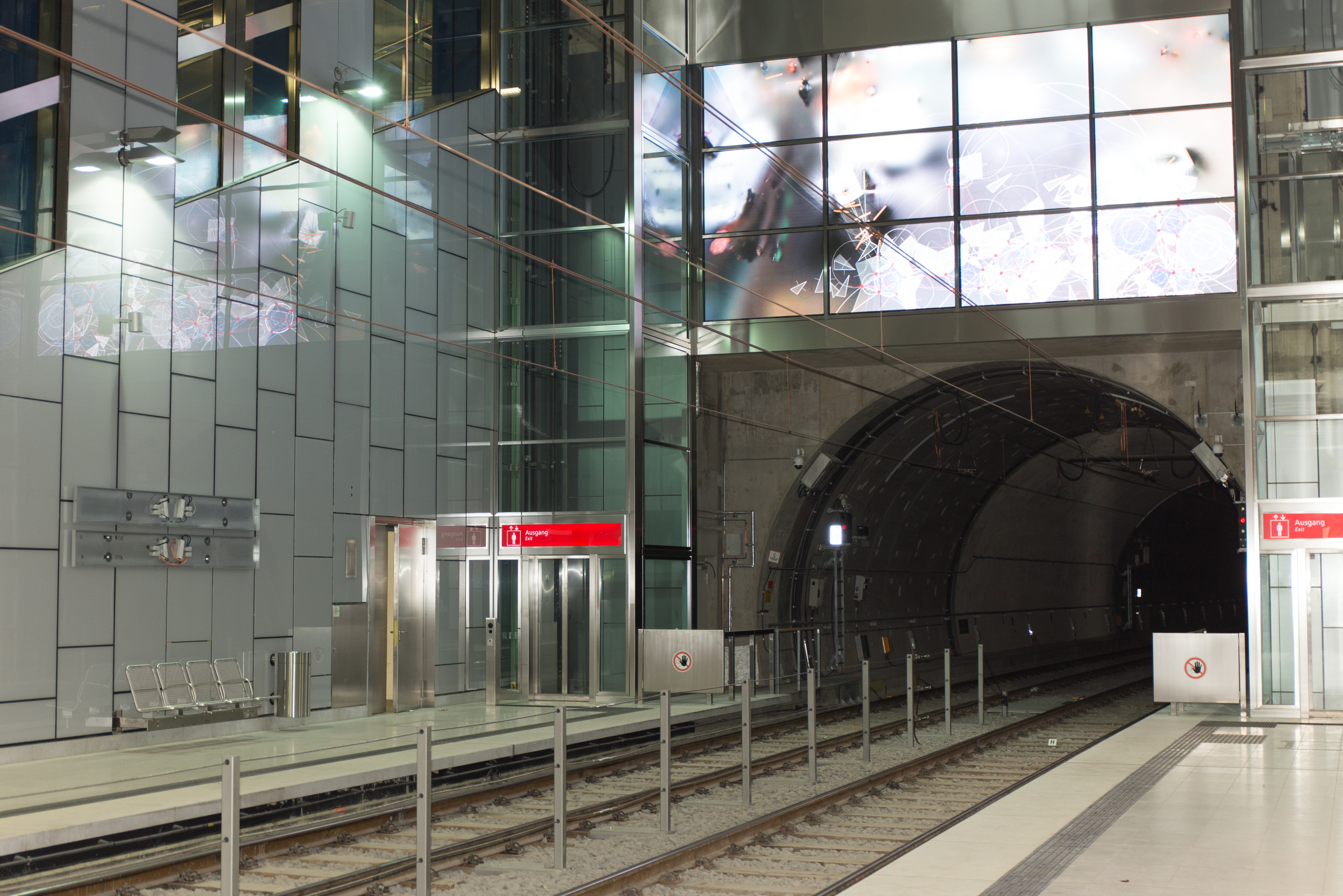
Station Schadowstraße from the new Wehrhahn-Linie

In late 2019, construction work for the new U81 line started. The first section will connect Freiligrathplatz and the airport. Initially, this segment was expected to open in 2025; however, due to planning errors and construction delays, the launch was postponed to the second quarter of 2026. The extension officially opened on 4 September 2026, with lines U80 and U81 introduced.

== Rolling stock ==
There are a total of 135 trainsets for the Düsseldorf Stadtbahn, of which 103 are six-axle articulated LRV (Light Rail Vehicle) of the type Düwag B80D (Type B, 80km/h Vmax, "Drehstrom" [eddie current motor]), which operate on the lines U70 and U75-U79, and 32 are eight-axle articulated tramsets (GT8SU), which are mostly found on the lines U75 and U78. Both the B80D and the GT8SU have a floor height at around 90 cm (35 in) above the tracks.

The B80D sets were delivered in two batches: the first in 1981 consisted of 12 LRV with vehicle bodies made of Steel, and the second batch was delivered between 1985 and 1993, with the remaining 92 LRV, manufactured with aluminium body shells. The two batches can be distinguished by the sets' car numbers, as well as details of the body shell: for the first batch the numbers are prefixed by "40" and for the second one either a "41" or "42". The steel body shells stand apart from their later counterparts by the inclusion of a rounded transition from the side of the car to the roof, whereas the aluminium body shells have an angular, sharply beveled topography. The earlier sets also used to have a singular door near the driver's cab on both the left and right sides relative to the driver's seat, which on the left side was eventually taken out and replaced with a simple window, which can today still be guessed at from its current appearance of the drivers' cab (2023). The later aluminium body shells omitted the left hand door, in favour of a larger driver's cab. The steel body shells were also given a more glossy exterior paint job, while a more matt paint job was used on the aluminium body shells. After an accident in 2001, one of the sets (numbered 4001) was deemed to be damaged beyond repair and scrapped.

The GT8SU sets were originally purchased by the Rheinbahn from Düwag/Kiepe in 1973 as street-level-entry GT8S sets for the Tram network and later modified for use on the Stadtbahn in 1981 with folding steps, now designated GT8SU for "U-Bahn".

Furthermore, the lines U71-U73 and U83 are operated by eight-axle trainsets of type NF8U, which have a floor height of 30 cm (12 in) above the tracks. Starting from 2022, a total of 59 HF6 LRV manufactured by Alstom subsidiary Bombardier Transportation are being delivered to replace the older GT8SU and B80D units.

== See also ==
- Trams in Düsseldorf
- Rhine-Ruhr S-Bahn
- Rhein-Ruhr Stadtbahn
- Verkehrsverbund Rhein-Ruhr
- List of rapid transit systems
