= Merkur Spiel-Arena/Messe Nord station =

Railway station in Düsseldorf, Germany

Merkur Spiel-Arena/Messe Nord
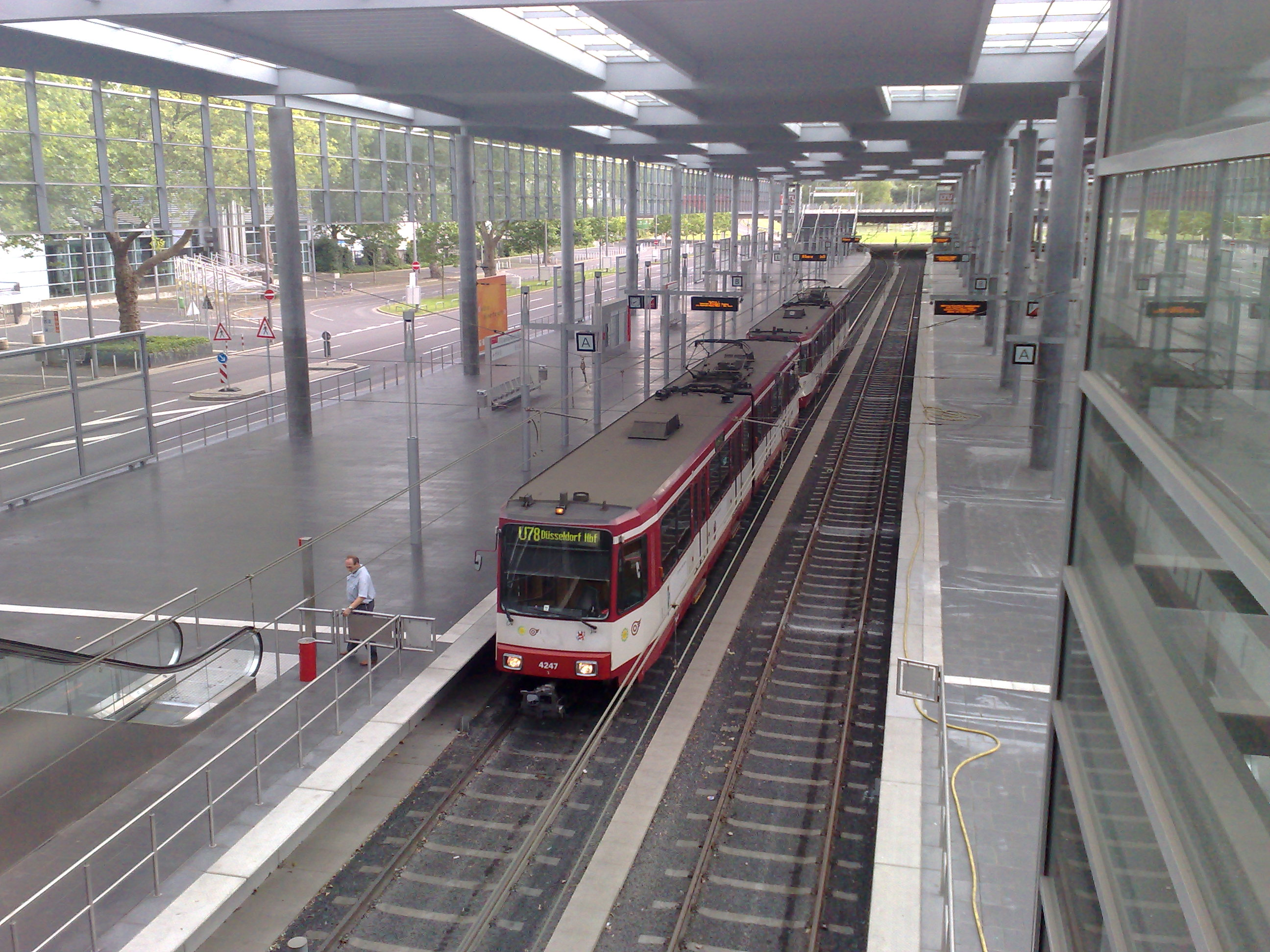
- A train of the Düsseldorf Stadtbahn at the station in 2008

General information
- Location: Düsseldorf, North Rhine-Westphalia; Germany
- Coordinates: 51°15′40″N 6°44′11″E
- Owner: Rheinbahn
- Line: Stammstrecke 1
- Platforms: 1 island platform; 2 side platforms
- Tracks: 3
- Train operators: Rheinbahn

Services
Preceding station	Rhine-Ruhr Stadtbahn	Following station
Terminus	U78	Mörikestraße towards Düsseldorf Hbf
Location

Merkur Spiel-Arena/Messe Nord station (German: U-Bahnhof Merkur Spiel-Arena/Messe Nord) is a surface-level rapid transit station in the city of Düsseldorf, in North Rhine-Westphalia, Germany. It is part of the Düsseldorf Stadtbahn network and serves the Merkur Spiel-Arena.

== Services ==
As of the December 2020 timetable change, the following services stop at Merkur Spiel-Arena/Messe Nord:

- U78: service every 10 minutes to Düsseldorf Hauptbahnhof.
