= Rhine-Ruhr Stadtbahn =

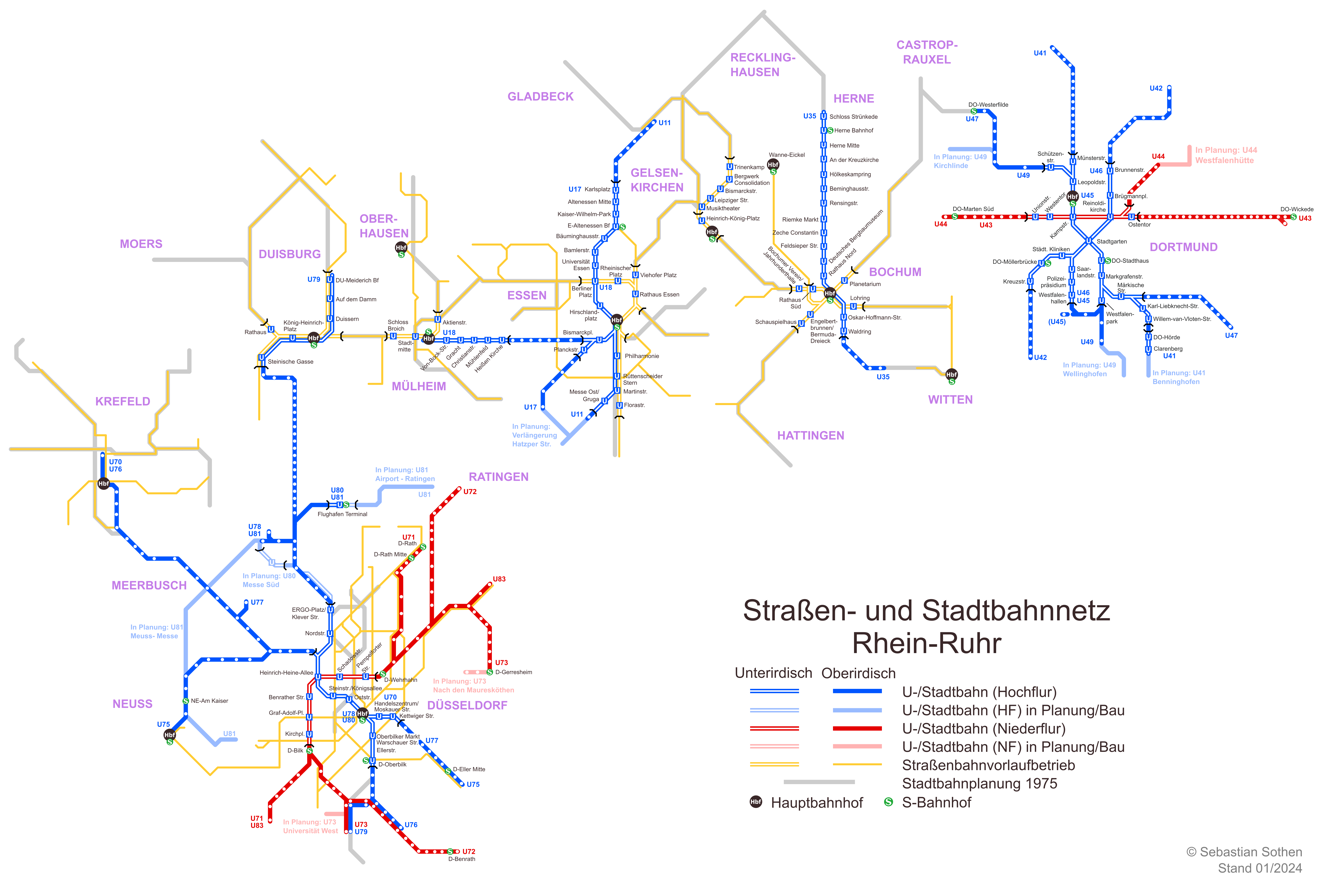
Map of the complete Rhine-Ruhr Stadtbahn systems network (Outdated)

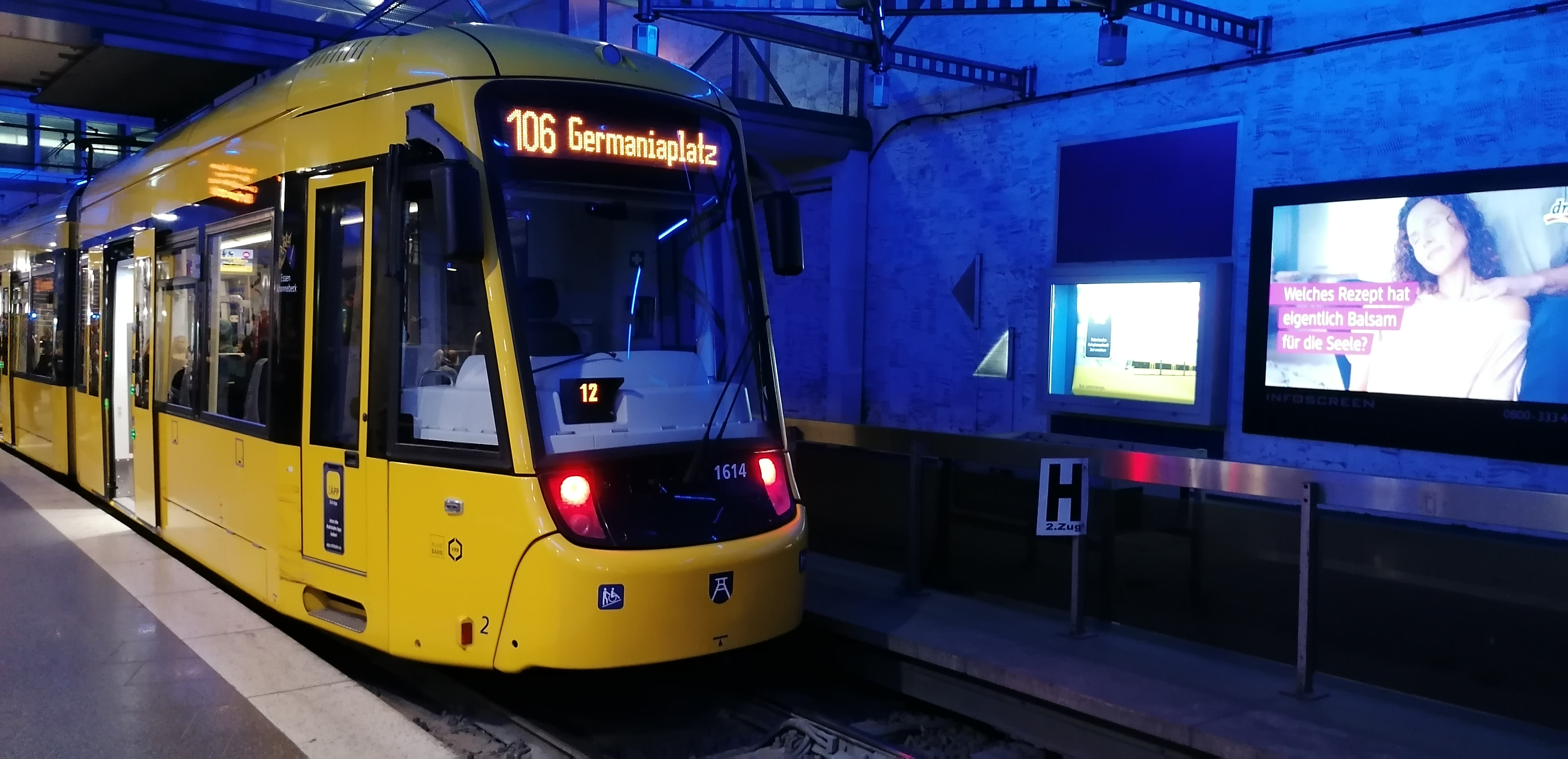
A tram of the Rhine-Ruhr Stadtbahn in Essen

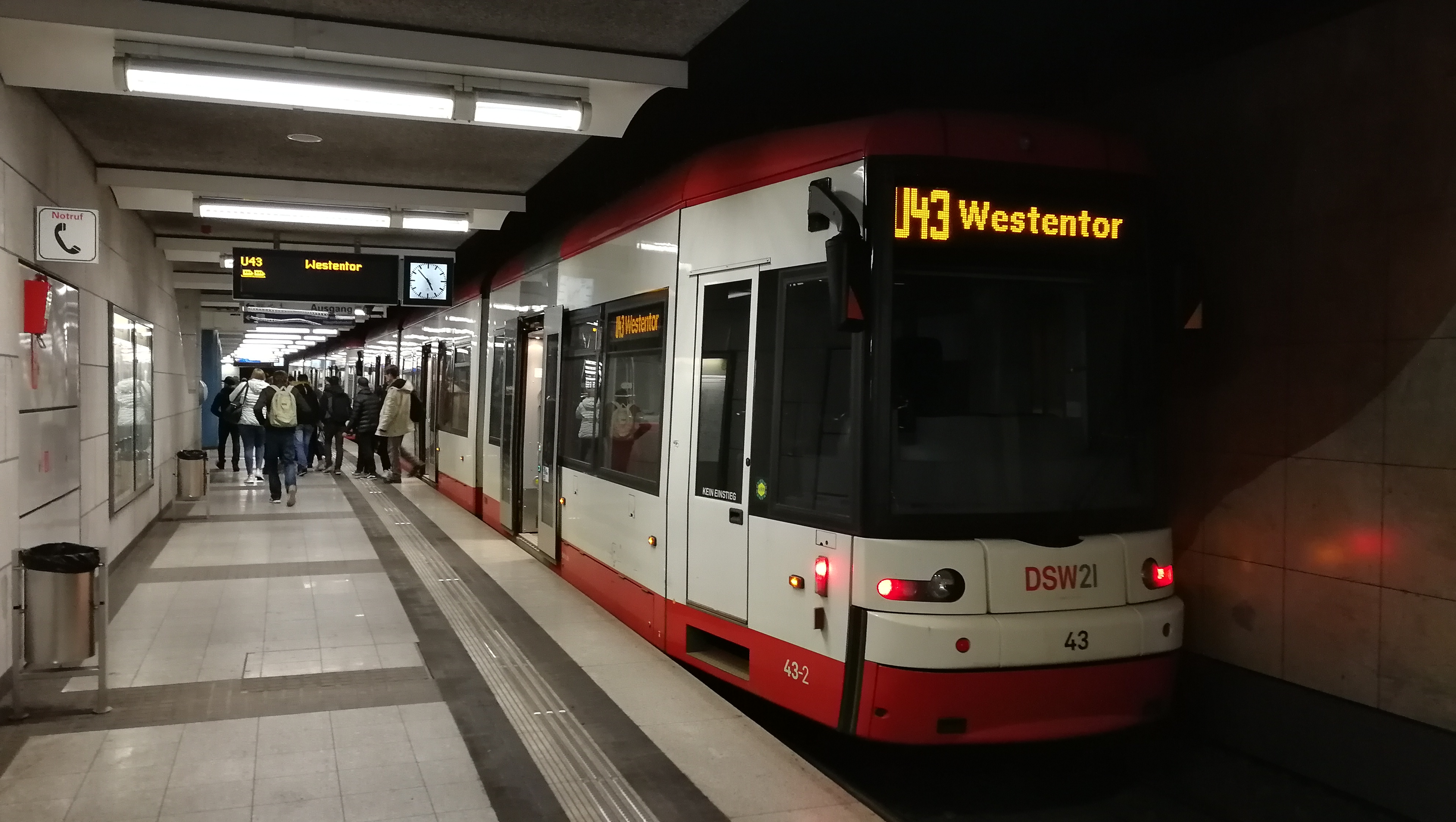
A tram of the Rhine-Ruhr Stadtbahn in Dortmund

The Rhine-Ruhr Stadtbahn (German: Stadtbahn Rhein-Ruhr) is an umbrella system of all of the Stadtbahn (light rail) lines included in the integrated public transport network of the Verkehrsverbund Rhein-Ruhr (VRR), which covers the Rhine-Ruhr metropolitan area in western Germany. It does not include the Cologne and Bonn Stadtbahn systems, which are integrated in the Verkehrsverbund Rhein-Sieg (VRS).

== History ==
At the beginning of the 1960s, road traffic in the Rhine-Ruhr area increased like in other German metropolitan areas. Existing trams were regarded as obstacles for car-oriented cities. Therefore, these trams should be relocated to underground sections below city centers (as Stadtbahn lines) if they were not replaced by bus lines.

The cities of Bochum, Castrop-Rauxel, Dortmund, Duisburg, Essen, Gelsenkirchen, Herne, Mülheim an der Ruhr, Oberhausen, Recklinghausen and Wattenscheid founded the Stadtbahngesellschaft Ruhr in 1969 for coordinating the plans to transform tram routes into Stadtbahn routes. Düsseldorf and Hattingen joined in 1972; since then, the cooperation has been called Stadtbahngesellschaft Rhein-Ruhr. Witten joined in 1981, Recklinghausen left in 1982.

Original Stadtbahn plans proposed upgrading up to 300 kilometers of tram lines step by step. Most of these proposed lines were planned in north-south direction and would have branched off of a main line that would have run more or less east-west. Due to financial constraints and the downturn of the economy in the region, many sections of the originally planned system have not been built. As a result, there are isolated standard gauge Stadtbahn lines inside of metre gauge tram systems – one example would be the U35 line in Bochum.

== Component systems ==
There are five Stadtbahn systems that make up the Rhine-Ruhr Stadtbahn (their operating companies are shown in parentheses):

- Bochum Stadtbahn (BOGESTRA) – 1 line
- Dortmund Stadtbahn (Dortmunder Stadtwerke (DSW21)) – 8 lines
- Duisburg Stadtbahn (Duisburger Verkehrsgesellschaft (DVG)) – 1 line
- Düsseldorf Stadtbahn (Rheinbahn) – 11 lines
- Essen Stadtbahn (Ruhrbahn) – 3 lines

=== Lines ===
As of 2016, there are 23 lines altogether in the Rhine-Ruhr Stadtbahn:

Line	System	Cities on Route	Stations (underground)	Date Opened
U11	Essen Stadtbahn	Essen, Gelsenkirchen	23 (14)	1 June 1986
U17	Essen Stadtbahn	Essen	17 (12)	27 November 1981
U18	Essen Stadtbahn	Essen, Mülheim	17 (10)	28 May 1977
U35	Bochum Stadtbahn	Bochum, Herne	21 (15)	2 September 1989
U41	Dortmund Stadtbahn	Dortmund, Lünen	28 (12)	27 May 1983 / 2 June 1984
U42	Dortmund Stadtbahn	Dortmund	28 (7)	15 May 1976 / 26 September 1992 / 16 June 2002
U43	Dortmund Stadtbahn	Dortmund	34 (5)	27 April 2008
U44	Dortmund Stadtbahn	Dortmund	19 (4)	27 April 2008
U45	Dortmund Stadtbahn	Dortmund	8 (7)	2 June 1984
U46	Dortmund Stadtbahn	Dortmund	7 (7)	27 May 1983 / 2 June 1996
U47	Dortmund Stadtbahn	Dortmund	27 (8)	2 June 1984
U49	Dortmund Stadtbahn	Dortmund	11 (8)	1990
U70	Düsseldorf Stadtbahn	Düsseldorf, Krefeld, Meerbusch	17 (5)	6 August 1988
U71	Düsseldorf Stadtbahn	Düsseldorf	42 (6)	21 February 2016
U72	Düsseldorf Stadtbahn	Düsseldorf, Ratingen	31 (6)	21 February 2016
U73	Düsseldorf Stadtbahn	Düsseldorf	23 (6)	21 February 2016
U74	Düsseldorf Stadtbahn	Düsseldorf, Meerbusch	31 (8)	May 1994
U75	Düsseldorf Stadtbahn	Düsseldorf, Neuss	28 (7)	May 1994
U76	Düsseldorf Stadtbahn	Düsseldorf, Krefeld, Meerbusch	28 (6)	6 August 1988
U77	Düsseldorf Stadtbahn	Düsseldorf	22 (8)	May 1994
U78	Düsseldorf Stadtbahn	Düsseldorf	15 (8)	6 August 1988
U79	Duisburg Stadtbahn; Düsseldorf Stadtbahn	Duisburg, Düsseldorf	45 (21)	6 August 1988
U83	Düsseldorf Stadtbahn	Düsseldorf	35 (6)	21 February 2016

== Infrastructure ==
All plans included the following standards:

- intersection-free alignment, in city centres preferred to be underground, in the outskirts also above surface
- high-level platforms for easy access (in contrast to former low-floor platforms or even access from street level)
- European standard gauge (1,435 mm (4 ft 8 1/2 in))

Cross-platform interchanges were planned wherever useful and possible. All Stadtbahn lines have been electrified with overhead catenary and are powered with direct current like former trams.

However, most of Rhine-Ruhr tram lines still use metre gauge (1,000 mm (3 ft 3 3/8 in)). Combined Stadtbahn and tram tracks use three-rail tracks (Essen) or even four-rail tracks (Krefeld). Some sections in Mülheim an der Ruhr, Bochum und Essen were constructed with metre gauge and temporary integrated into the network, being able to be converted easily to standard gauge at a later point of time.

Since the start of Rhine-Ruhr Stadtbahn, existing tram routes were integrated and partly developed as pilot routes. Among others, the former tram lines 8/18 Essen–Mülheim were chosen to become the most important pilot route with tracks in between the Ruhrschnellweg express highway lanes; the new pilot Stadtbahn line U18 was opened in 1977.

Most of today's Stadtbahn lines were developed out of former tram lines. Their line numbers were simply converted into two-digit numbers prepended by U for distinguishing between both standards; the U refers to both unabhängig (engl.: independent) and U-Bahn (metro) standards being the later target, although complete U-Bahn (metro) lines have in fact never existed in the Rhine-Ruhr area. By 2022, the only full independent lines in the Rhine-Ruhr area are the Dortmund H-Bahn, Düsseldorf SkyTrain, Wuppertal Schwebebahn (also referred as line 60 in the Stadtbahn numbering scheme) hanging and suspended monorails, the U18 line in Essen and U46 in Dortmund.

== Developments ==
The very ambitious original plans have not paid enough attention to financial restrictions and increased tunneling costs in the mining areas. So, the schedule for opening the planned sections has been severely delayed with some routes even cancelled. The next step to transform Stadtbahn routes to metro standards is no longer foreseen.

To use of constructed sections, existing tram lines have been operated further on the new alignments including temporary use of tram gauges and low-floor platforms. Some stations even contain both low-floor and high-floor platforms in case of mixed tram and Stadtbahn operation.

== Rolling stock ==
For the Rhine-Ruhr Stadtbahn, new standardised Stadtbahn trains named Stadtbahnwagen B were developed. However, Stadtbahn companies ordered them with different lengths, layout of doors etc..

Tram lines still use former rolling stock and new low-floor trams where Stadtbahn projects were stopped or severely delayed.

== Routes of Rhine-Ruhr Stadtbahn ==
Opening date	Stadtbahn section	Notes
05 Oct 1967	Essen Saalbau	sub-surface tram station, changed in 1984 (metre gauge)
03 Nov 1972	Bochum Klinikum – Hustadt	as tram until 1994, not in tunnel (metre gauge)
1974	Duisburg Neuer Friedhof – Düsseldorf Wittlaer	pilot route, includes elevated and underground sections, as tram until 1981
15 May 1976	Dortmund Kirchderne – Grevel	elevated, as tram lines 402/406 until 1992, today called U42
28 May 1977	Mülheim Heißen Kirche – Essen Wiener Platz	pilot route, first line with full Stadtbahn standards in the Rhine-Ruhr area
28 May 1977	Essen Saalbau – Porscheplatz	sub-surface tram operation (metre gauge)
25 May 1979	Bochum Schauspielhaus – Hauptbahnhof	sub-surface tram operation (metre gauge)
03 Nov 1979	Mülheim Heißen Kirche – Mülheim Hauptbahnhof	partly not in tunnel
03 Oct 1981	Düsseldorf Rampe Kennedydamm – Rampe Opernhaus (Heinr.-Heine-Allee)	sub-surface tram operation until 1988, two stops
27 Nov 1981	Essen Bismarckstraße – Rampe Planckstraße	further to Margarethenhöhe
27 Nov 1981	Essen Wiener Platz – Universität/Gesamthochschule	
28 Nov 1981	Bochum Rampe Ruhrstadion – Bochum Hauptbahnhof	sub-surface tram operation (metre gauge)
27 May 1983	Dortmund Clarenberg – Hörde Bf	as premetro lines 401/406 until 1984, today called U41
02 Jun 1984	Dortmund Westfalenpark bzw. Rampe Märkische Str. – Lortzing-/Schützenstraße	high-floor Stadtbahn (Stammstrecke I)
01 Sep 1984	Gelsenkirchen Hauptbahnhof – Musiktheater	sub-surface tram operation (metre gauge)
27 May 1985	Mülheim Hauptbahnhof – Aktienstraße	sub-surface tram operation (metre gauge)
27 Sep 1985	Essen Porscheplatz – Viehofer Platz	sub-surface tram operation (metre gauge)
31 May 1986	Essen Saalbau – Messe/Gruga bzw. Rampe Florastraße	further to Bredeney, mixed operation metre gauge tram / standard gauge Stadtbahn
24 Aug 1986	Dortmund Märkische Straße – Willem-van-Vloten-Straße	including Kohlgartenstraße ramp
7 May 1988	Düsseldorf Heinrich-Heine-Allee – Düsseldorf Hauptbahnhof	four-track tunnel, four stops, demolition of Opernhaus ramp
06 Aug 1988	Düsseldorf Hauptbahnhof – Rampe Stahlwerkstraße	further to Oberbilk/Philipshalle (S) and Holthausen
06 Aug 1988	Düsseldorf Heinrich-Heine-Allee – Rampe Tonhalle	further to Oberkassel, Krefeld and Neuss
02 Sep 1989	Herne Schloss Strünkede – Bochum Hauptbahnhof	
27 May 1990	Dortmund Westfalenstadion	
09 Nov 1991	Essen Porscheplatz – Berliner Platz	mixed sub-surface tram operation (metre gauge) and guided bus operation
1992/1993	Dortmund Hafen – Insterburger Straße	track moving, grade separated with a road underpass
11 Jul 1992	Duisburg Rampe Platanenhof bzw. Rathaus – Duissern (Rampe Rübenstraße)	four-track tunnel, partly sub-surface tram operation (metre gauge)
26 Sep 1992	Dortmund Stadtgarten – Brunnenstraße	high-floor Stadtbahn (Stammstrecke II)
26 Sep 1993	Düsseldorf Hauptbahnhof – Ronsdorfer Straße	further to Eller/Vennhauser Allee, two stops
27 Nov 1993	Bochum Hauptbahnhof – Waldring	further to Hustadt on gauge-converted tram route
28 May 1994	Gelsenkirchen Musiktheater – Ruhrzoo	sub-surface tram operation (metre gauge)
1 May 1995	Dortmund Stadtgarten – Städtische Kliniken	
02 Jun 1996	Dortmund Stadtgarten – Polizeipräsidium	
24 May 1998	Dortmund Polizeipräsidium – Westfalenhallen	
24 May 1998	Essen Universität/Gesamthochschule – Altenessen Bf	
19 Sep 1998	Mülheim Schloss Broich – Hauptbahnhof	sub-surface tram operation (metre and standard gauge)
23 Sep 2000	Duisburg Duissern – Meiderich Bf	partly sub-surface tram operation (standard gauge), demolition of Rübenstraße ramp
30 Sep 2001	Essen Altenessen Bf – Rampe II. Schichtstraße	further to Gelsenkirchen-Horst
15 Jun 2002	Düsseldorf Hauptbahnhof – Oberbilk/Philipshalle (S)	further to Holthausen, three stops, demolition of Stahlwerkstraße ramp
16 Jun 2002	Dortmund Städtische Kliniken – Kreuzstraße	
20 Mar 2005	Dortmund Barop Parkhaus	road underpass and relocation of station
27 Jan 2006	Bochum Bochumer Verein – Lohring, Rathaus – Hauptbahnhof	sub-surface tram operation (metre gauge)
27 Apr 2008	Dortmund Unionstraße – Reinoldikirche (– Ostentor)	low-floor Stadtbahn (Stammstrecke III)
24 Sep 2009	Düsseldorf Holthausen – Benrath, Betriebshof	high-floor Stadtbahn
30 Aug 2010	Düsseldorf Werstener Dortstraße – Werstener Dorfstraße – Südpark – Universität Ost/Botanischer Garten	high-floor Stadtbahn
20 Feb 2016	Düsseldorf Pempelforter Straße – Kirchplatz	low-floor Stadtbahn (Wehrhahn-Linie)
14 Nov 2016	Dortmund Hauptfriedhof – Allerstraße	road underpass (B1/A 40) and closure of Vahleweg station

== See also ==
- Bochum Stadtbahn (BOGESTRA)
- Dortmund Stadtbahn
- Düsseldorf Stadtbahn (see also: Rheinbahn)
- Essen: Public Transport (incl. Essen Stadtbahn)
- Verkehrsverbund Rhein-Ruhr (VRR)
