= Bredeney =

Borough of Essen, Germany

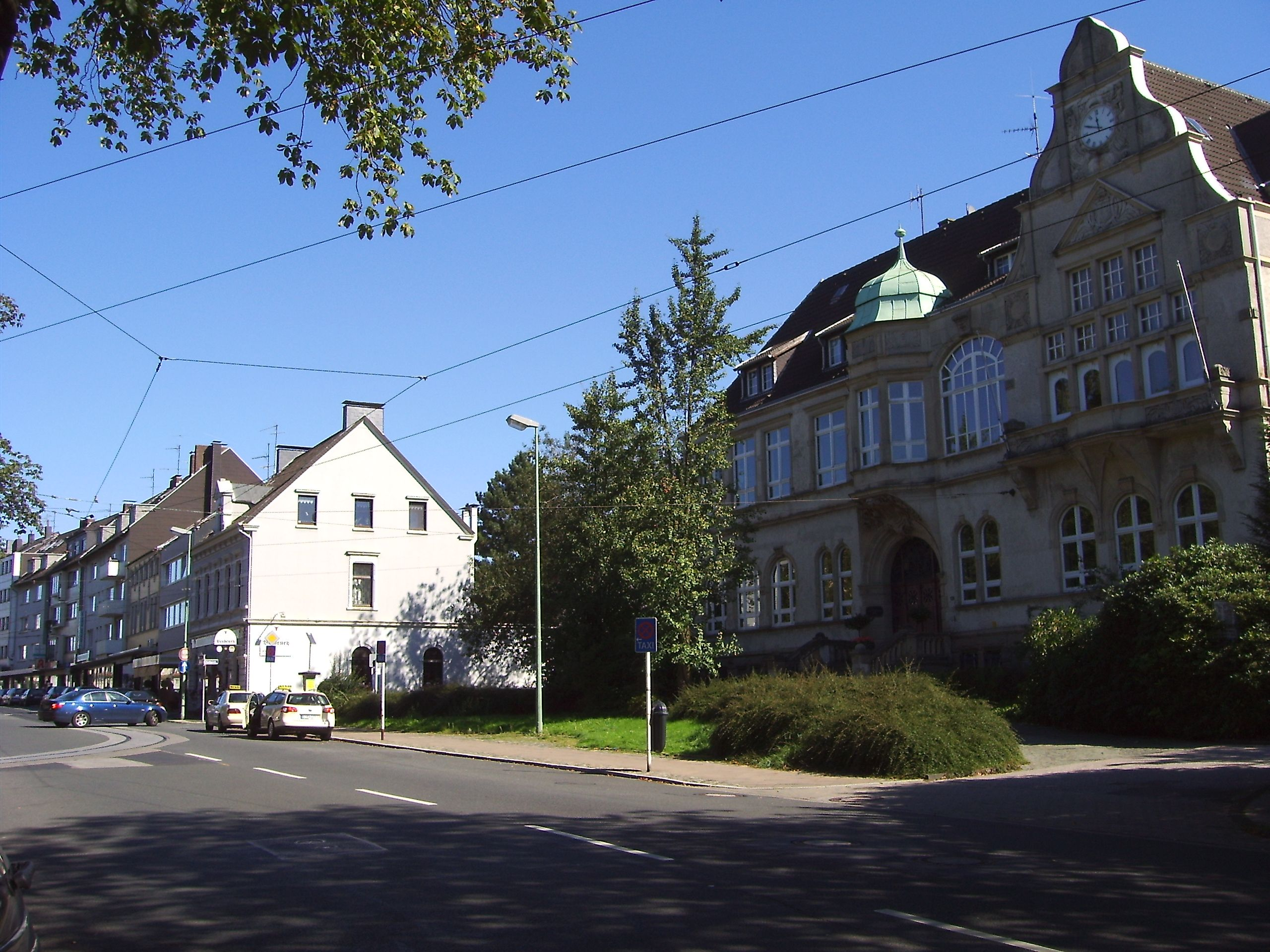
Former townhall of Bredeney

Bredeney is a southern borough of the city of Essen, Germany. It was incorporated into the city in 1915. Around 10,700 people live here. Bredeney is known to be a wealthy borough and the "green lung" of the city.

Lake Baldeney and the Villa Hügel, heritage of the Krupp family are located here, as well as Essen-Hügel station.

== Geography ==
Bredeney borders the boroughs of Heisingen to the east, Fischlaken and Werden to the south, Schuir and Haarzopf in the west, and Margarethenhöhe, Rüttenscheid and Stadtwald in the north.
