= Essen Süd station =

Railway station in Essen, Germany

Essen Süd
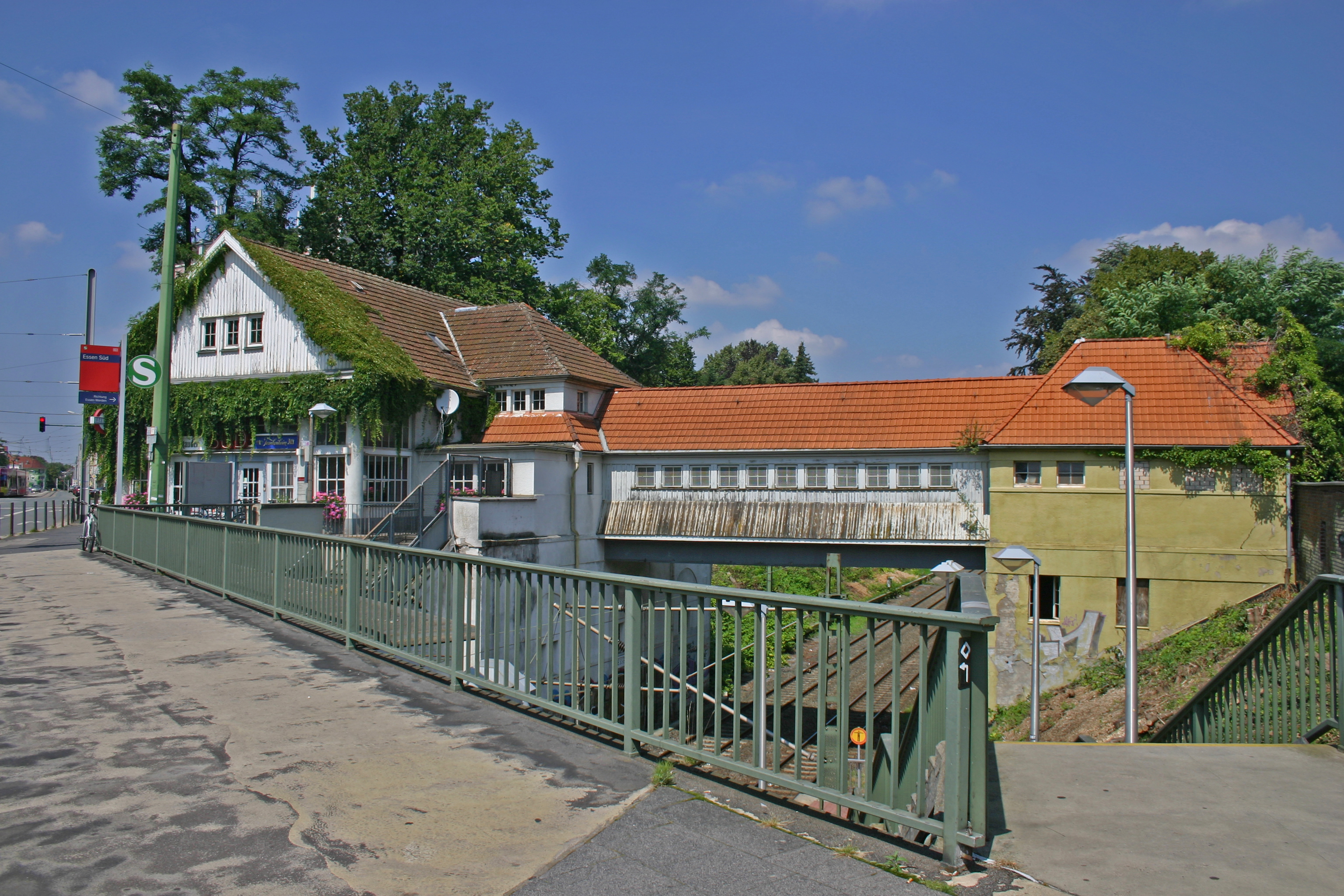
- Former station building, now used as a restaurant

General information
- Location: Essen, NRW; Germany
- Coordinates: 51°26′24″N 7°01′23″E
- Lines: Essen-Werden–Essen (KBS 450.6)
- Platforms: 2

Construction
- Accessible: Yes

Other information
- Station code: 1692
- DS100 code: EESD
- IBNR: 8001897
- Category: 5
- Fare zone: VRR: 350
- Website: www.bahnhof.de

History
- Opened: 1914/17

Services
Preceding station	Rhine-Ruhr S-Bahn	Following station
Essen Stadtwald towards Köln-Nippes	S6	Essen Hbf Terminus
Location

Essen Süd (south) station (German: Haltepunkt Essen Süd) is located on the Essen-Werden–Essen railway in the Essen borough of Südviertel ("southern quarter") in the German state of North Rhine Westphalia. It is heritage-listed.

== History ==
The station is located the Essen-Werden–Essen railway, which was opened by the Bergisch-Märkische Railway Company on 15 August 1877 and connects the Ruhr Valley Railway to the Essen Hauptbahnhof.

Essen Süd, which was modelled on suburban stations in Berlin, was built in 1914. The station buildings are located on both sides of the tracks, which are in a deep cutting. The main building consists of a single-storey building with a gabled roof and its frontage is framed by neoclassical columns. The annex on the other side of the tracks is a smallish building with a hip roof and is set back from the road. Both parts of the building are connected by a covered walkway. The ensemble was heritage-listed as a monument of the city of Essen on 14 April 1988.

Since 1974, Essen Süd station has been served by line S6 of the Rhine-Ruhr S-Bahn.

== Current situation ==
The station is now served by line S6 of the Rhine-Ruhr S-Bahn and lies on the Essen-Werden–Essen railway. The owner of the property is DB Station&Service, which classified it as a category 5 station.

In former station building from 1914 is no longer used as such today. The station has two outside platforms accessible from the street.

A stop of the Essen tramway is located on the street spanning the station.

== Operations ==
The station is served only by line S6 of the Rhine-Ruhr S-Bahn at 20-minute intervals. Connections to tram line 105 are offered every 10 minutes.
