= Reliquary Shrine (de Touyl) =

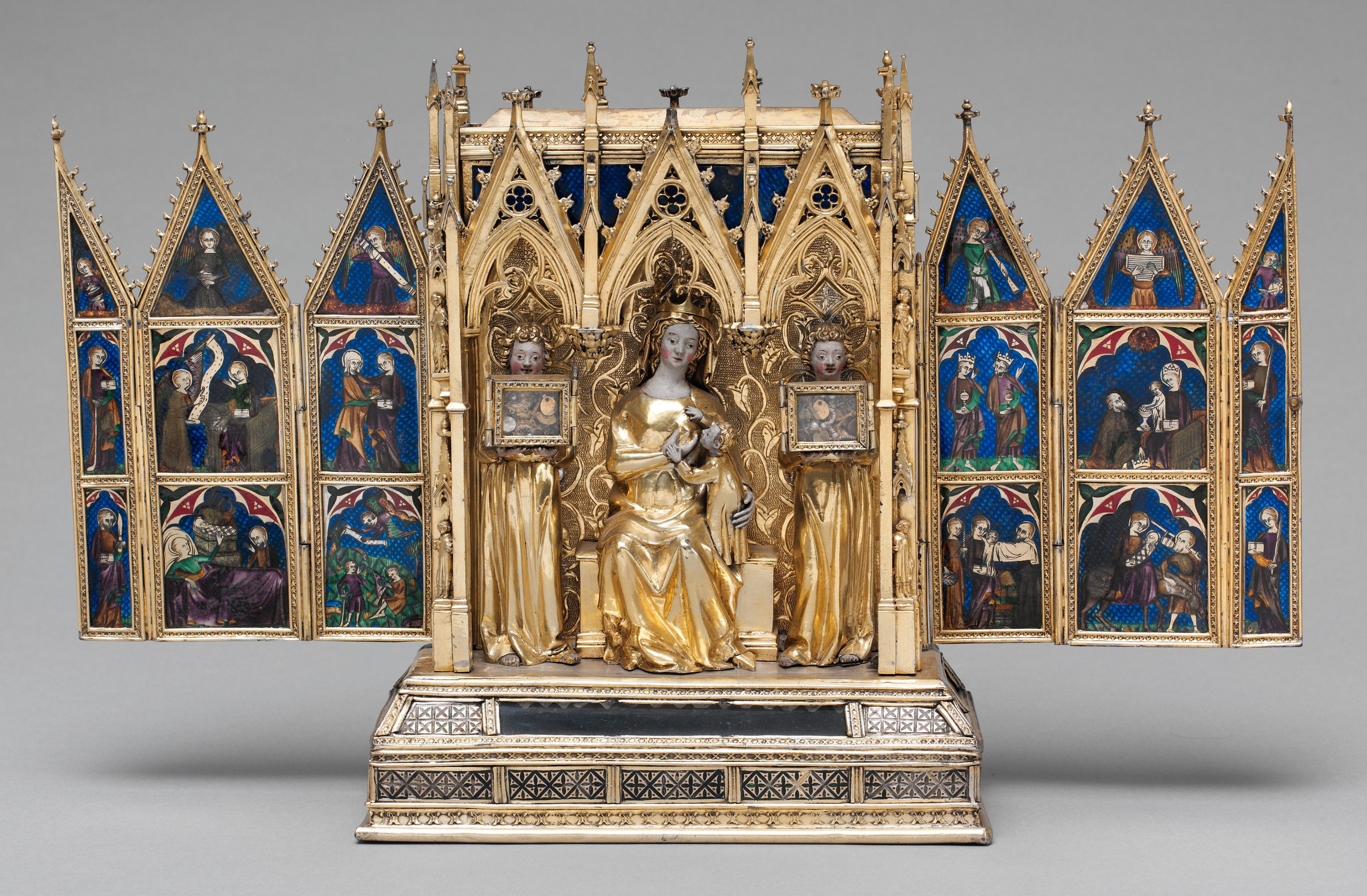
Reliquary Shrine, Open: 25.4 × 40.6 cm. The Cloisters, New York

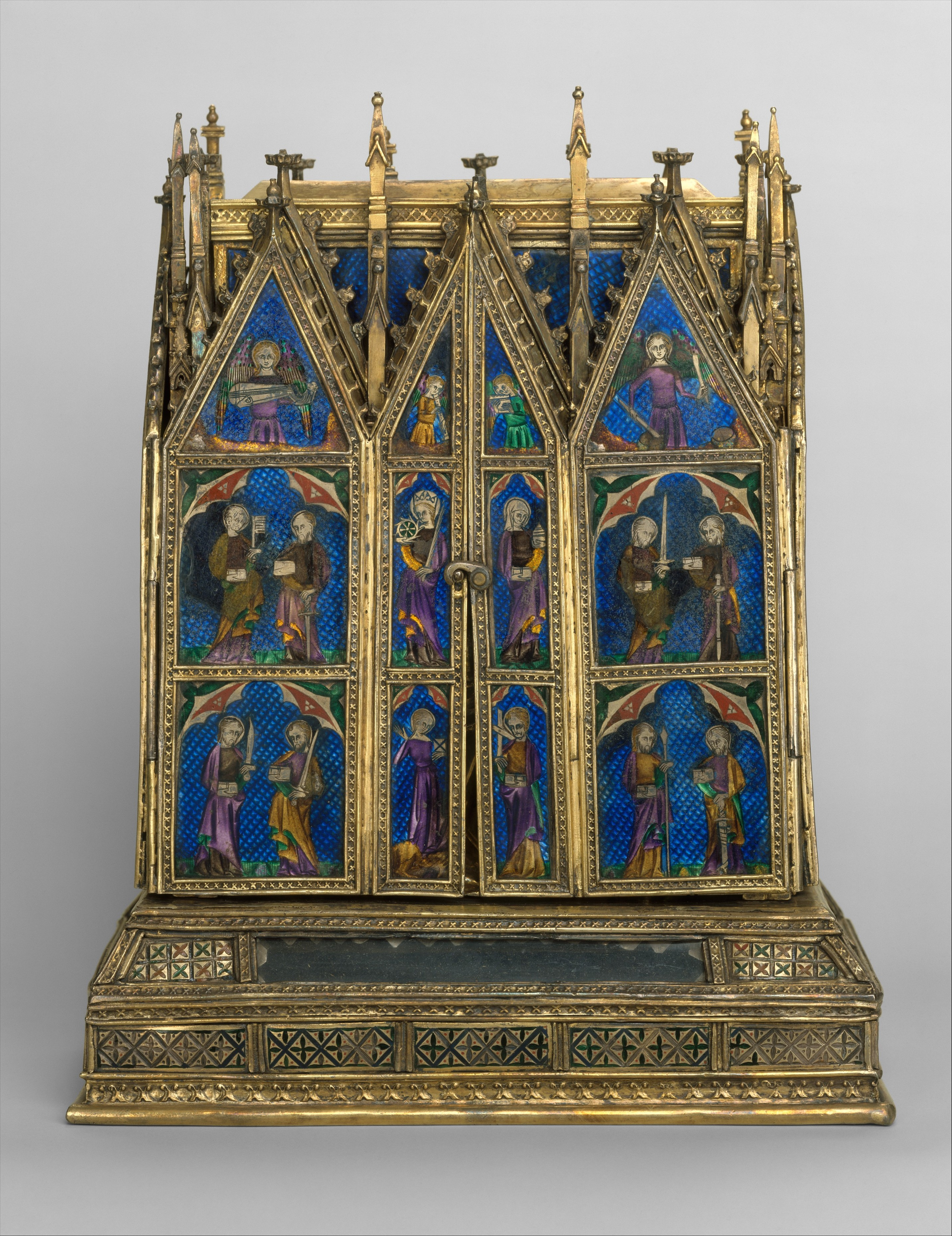
Closed view

The Reliquary Shrine is an especially complex 14th century container for relics, now in The Cloisters, New York. It is made from translucent enamel, gilt-silver and paint, and dated to c 1325–50. Although first mentioned in a convent in Budapest, its style and influences indicates French craftsmanship. It has been tentatively attributed by the Met to Jean de Toul, a French goldsmith about whom little is known, but who is associated with a small number of works with similar stylistic characteristics.

The centrepiece shows the enthroned Virgin and the infant Jesus, the hinged wings are painted on both sides with scenes from the Annunciation to the childhood of Jesus. In medieval Christianity, the holiest of relics were those associated with the Virgin and Child.

== Description ==
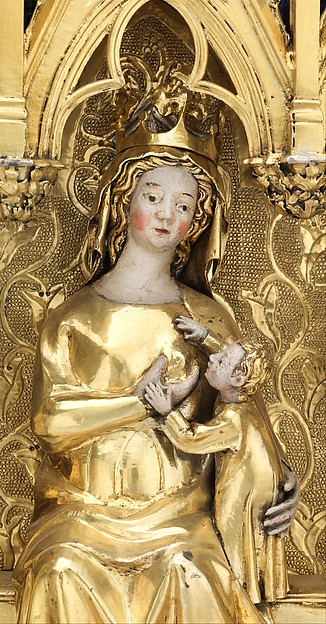
Detail of the Virgin and Child. Note her unnaturally large hands.

The shrine is one of four extant silver-gilt and enamel examples from the early 14th century. The central panel shows the Virgin and Child surrounded by angels, placed in an elaborate Gothic architectural shrine. The Virgin is enthroned and suckles the child Jesus at her breast. It is made from gilt-silver, translucent enamel, with painted surfaces. The work seems to imitate the space of a church. The arches and vaults are described in gilded silver, the wing panels are in enamel and in their colourisation, figuration and perspective, seem intended to evoke stained-glass windows. Created in the International Gothic style.

The Virgin and Christ child are situated in an arched canopy, flanked by two angels. The complex and minutely described architectural space seems to emulate an early 14th-century church. The edges of the central panel are lined with a series of statuesque saints in niches. Each of the two outer wings contains three foldable panels, showing scenes from the Life of the Virgin and Christ Child. Each of the six wing panels is crowned by a triangular panel containing a musical angel. The setting contains a number of elements reflective of contemporary Gothic architectural design, including ribbed vaults, buttress with figures of saints, and trefoil arches. Given its small scale, it was probably intended as a household object, for private prayer.

== Provenance ==
Its elaborate structure and supreme craftsmanship indicates that it was commissioned by members of the upper echelon of contemporary society. The shrine is first recorded in 17th- and 18th-century inventories of the convent of the Poor Clares nunnery at Buda, in today's Budapest. Queen Clementia of Hungary gifted the reliquary in the 14th century to her sister-in-law, Elizabeth of Poland, Queen of Hungary, who founded the convent. It was in the collection of the baroness Clarice de Rothschild, before it was acquired by the Metropolitan Museum of Art in 1962.

== Gallery ==
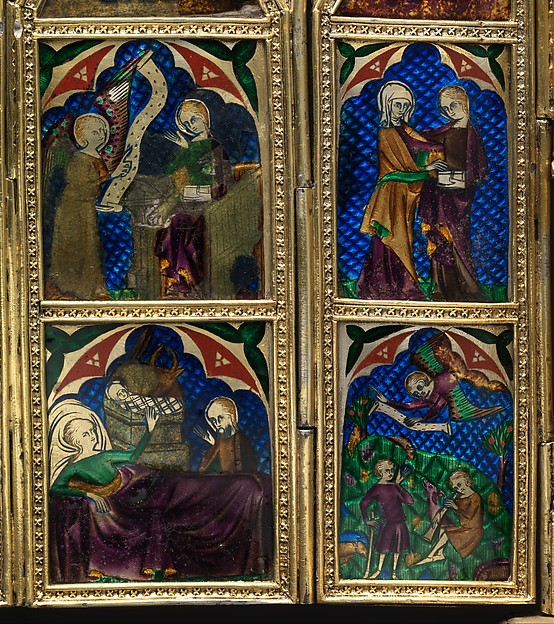
Detail, left wing

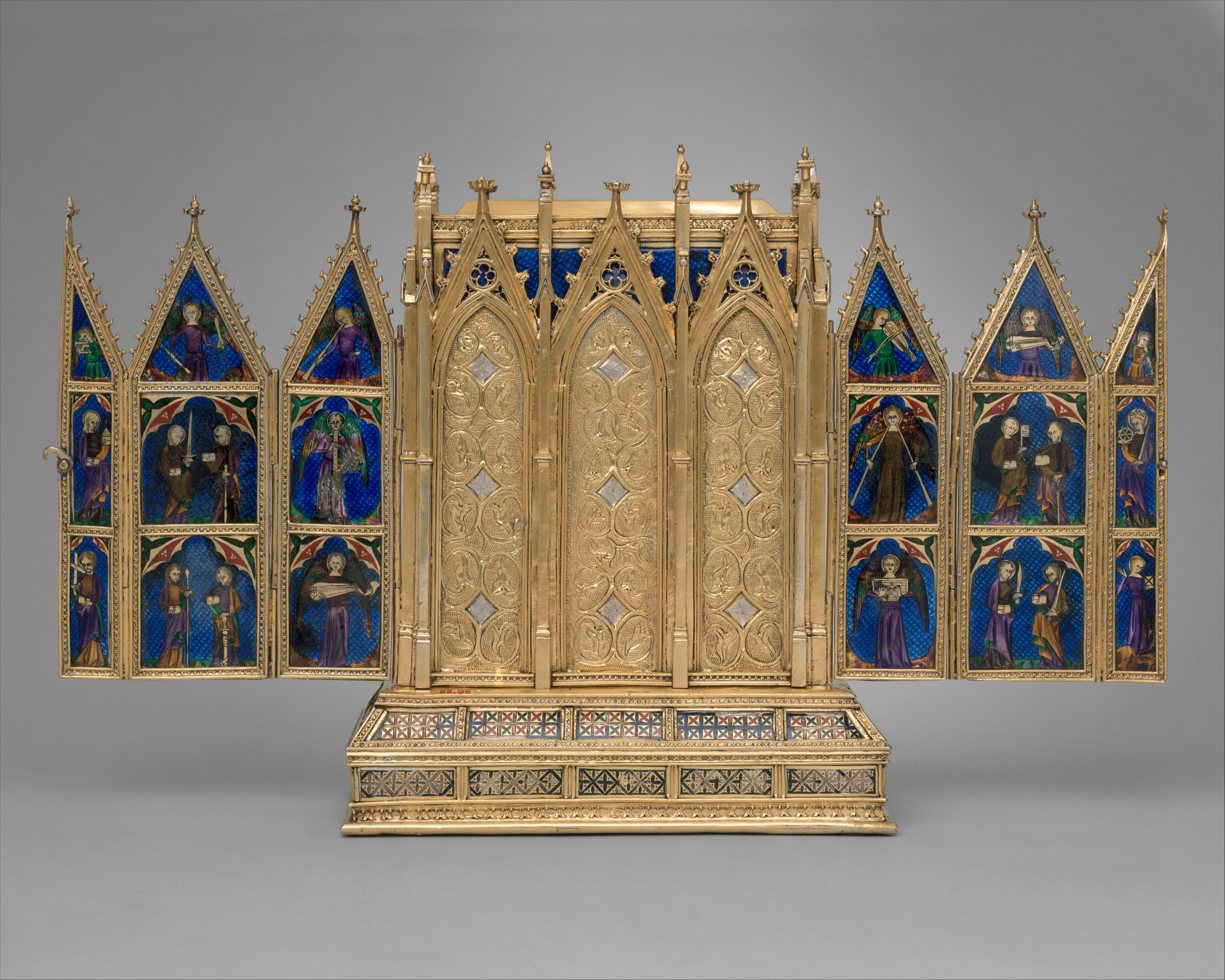
Verso, with enfolded wings

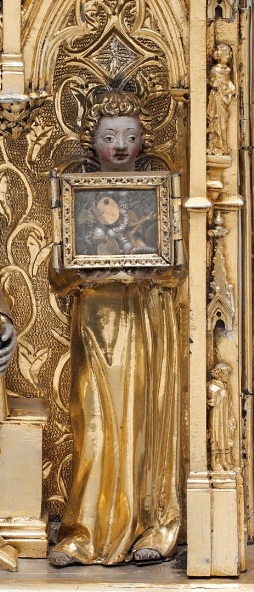
Detail of the right-hand angel in the central panel, with biblical figures in niches horizontally along the right border

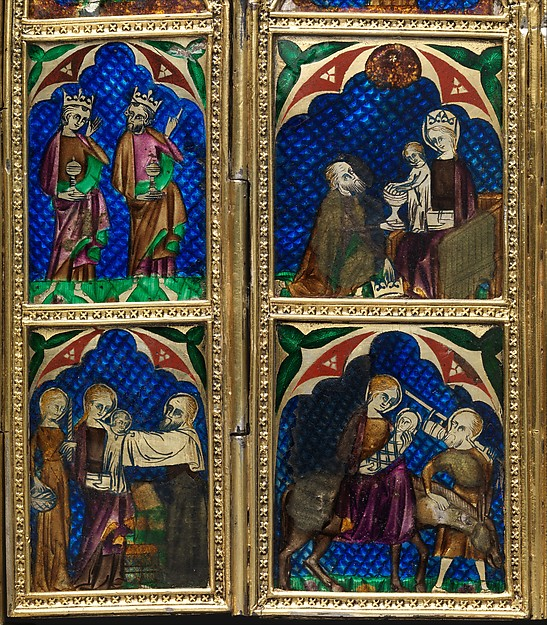
Detail, right wing

== Sources ==
- Barnet, Peter. The Cloisters: Medieval Art and Architecture. New Haven, CT: Yale University Press, 2005. ISBN 978-1-5883-9176-6
- Freeman, Margaret Beam. "A Shrine for a Queen." The Metropolitan Museum of Art Bulletin, Volume 21, no. 10, 1963
- Shepard, Mary in Charles Little and Timothy Husband. "Europe in the Middle Ages". New York: Metropolitan Museum of Art, 1989. ISBN 978-0-8709-9447-0
- Parker, Elizabeth. The Cloisters: Studies in Honor of the Fiftieth Anniversary. New York: Metropolitan Museum of Art, 1992. ISBN 978-0-8709-9635-1
- Primisser, Alois. Der silberne Hausaltar der ungarischen Königstochter Margarethe. Taschenbuch für die Vaterländische Geschichte 5, 1824
- Wixom, William. "Medieval Sculpture at The Cloisters". The Metropolitan Museum of Art Bulletin, Volume 46, no. 3, Winter, 1988–1989
