= Essen-Hügel station =

Railway station in Essen, Germany

Essen Hügel
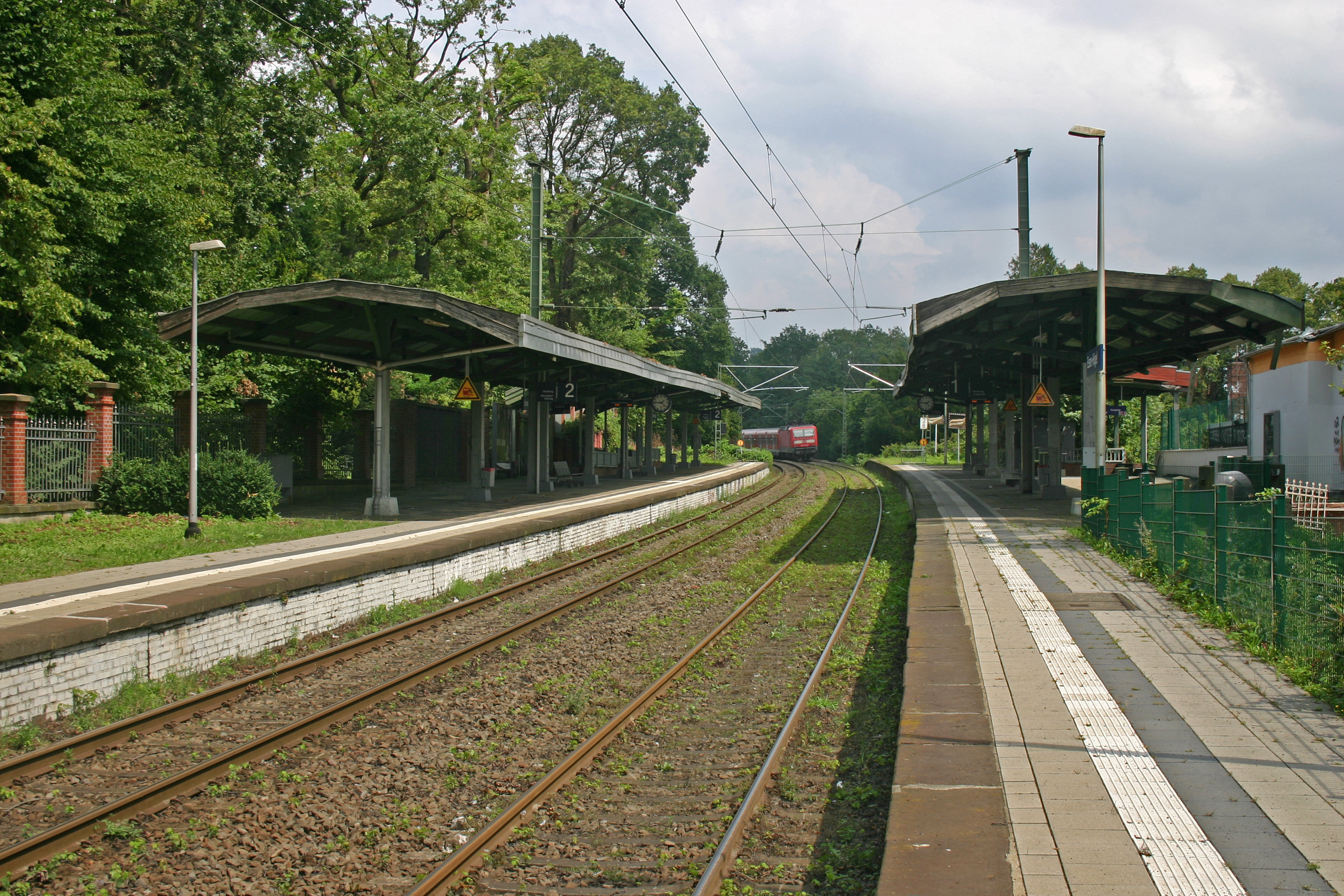
- Essen-Hügel station

General information
- Location: Freiherr-von-Stein-Str. 211, NRW; Germany
- Coordinates: 51°24′16″N 7°00′31″E
- Lines: Essen-Werden–Essen (KBS 450.6)
- Platforms: 2

Construction
- Accessible: No

Other information
- Station code: 1705
- DS100 code: EEHU
- IBNR: 8001908
- Category: 5
- Fare zone: VRR: 452
- Website: www.bahnhof.de

History
- Opened: 1890

Services
Preceding station	Rhine-Ruhr S-Bahn	Following station
Essen-Werden towards Köln-Nippes	S6	Essen Stadtwald towards Essen Hbf
Location

Essen-Hügel (formerly Bredeney) station is on the northern shore of the Baldeneysee (Lake Baldeney) in the Essen district of Bredeney in the German state of North Rhine Westphalia. In 1890, it was opened directly next to Hügel Park, the estate of the industrialist Friedrich Alfred Krupp and the location of the Villa Hügel, which had been built twenty years earlier. The station is located on the Essen-Werden–Essen railway, which connects the Ruhr Valley Railway to Essen Hauptbahnhof.

== History ==
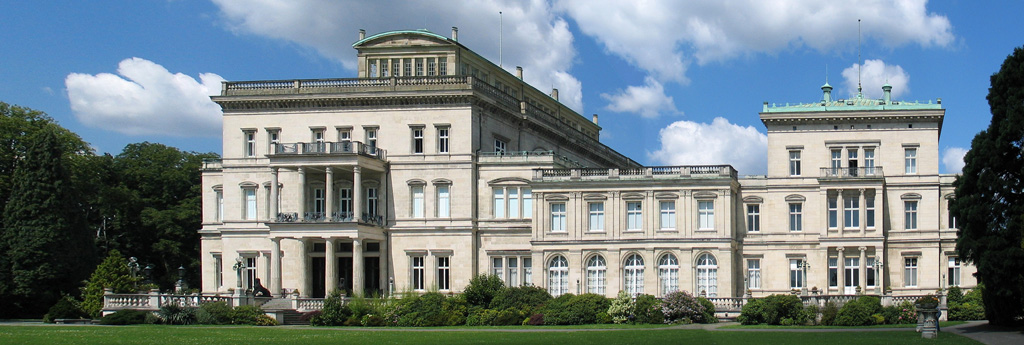
Villa Hügel

The station opened in 1890 so that guests of the Krupp family no longer had to travel from the existing stations of Werden or Rellinghausen-West (now Essen Stadtwald). However, it would also serve visitors to the scenic Ruhr valley, which was a place of recreation. In May 1889, Krupp requested the königlichen Eisenbahn-Direktion (Royal Railway Division) of Essen to establish Haltestelle Bredeney (Bredeney halt), which would be located between Werden and Rellinghausen stations at the 2.7 km mark (from Essen) on the Essen-Werden–Essen railway. The railway line was built in 1877 by the Bergisch-Märkische Railway Company, originally as a single-track line. The construction costs of Hügel station were met by Friedrich Krupp AG, with maintenance covered by the state. From 1896 a post office was housed in the station's ticket office for which the station master was responsible. However, this post office was only accessible by members of the Krupp family and employees of Hügel Park. It was listed until 1924 as an independent post office under the name of Krupp-Postamt (Krupp post office).

Friedrich Alfred Krupp was personally granted a special permit from the beginning so that he could reach the platforms of Hügel station directly from the gate of Hügel Park. Additional special permits were issued in 1895 for other employees of the Krupp company, the Hügel operations and distant family members. These also gave permission to cross the railway tracks, so as to avoid the detour through the tunnel under Hügel station. State guests—including the Egyptian King Fuad I, in June 1929—were also granted direct access via the park's gate. On such occasions, Krupp identity cards were issued for entry to the platforms in order to keep out onlookers. Later, Deutsche Reichsbahn took over the issuance of identification cards after questions were raised about the Krupps’ right to issue the cards at a state-owned station.

During the occupation of the Ruhr in 1923, members of the Organization Heinz of Albert Leo Schlageter carried out attacks with bombs, including at Hügel station, to obstruct the transport of coal to France.

In 1933, Hügel station became more important as a result of the construction of Lake Baldeney, so Deutsche Reichsbahn extended the station building and it was supplemented by a restaurant. This was able to accommodate the increased number of passengers.

== Current situation ==
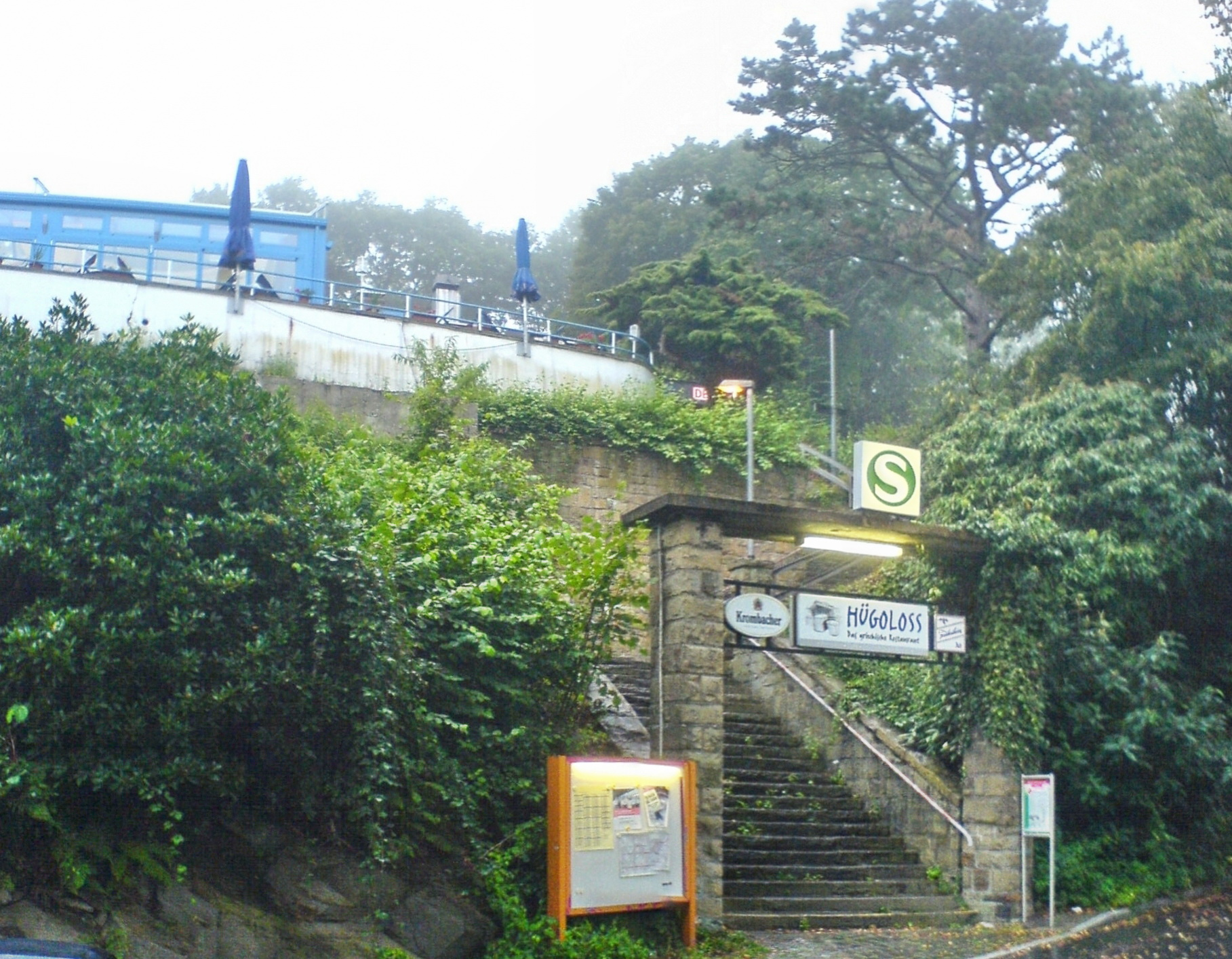
Entrance to the restaurant in 2007

The owner of the property is DB Station&Service, which classified it as a category 5 station.

The station building from 1890 offers a view of the Ruhr and—since its damming in 1933—Lake Baldeney. The restaurant is now operated as a Greek restaurant.

== Operations ==
There were long-distance services on the track shortly after its opening from Düsseldorf via Essen to Soest and, in addition, there were some special trains for members of the Krupp family, as well as German and foreign rulers.

The station is now served only by line S6 of the Rhine-Ruhr S-Bahn at 20-minute intervals.
