= Reliquary Cross (The Cloisters) =

C. 1180 silver and glass cross

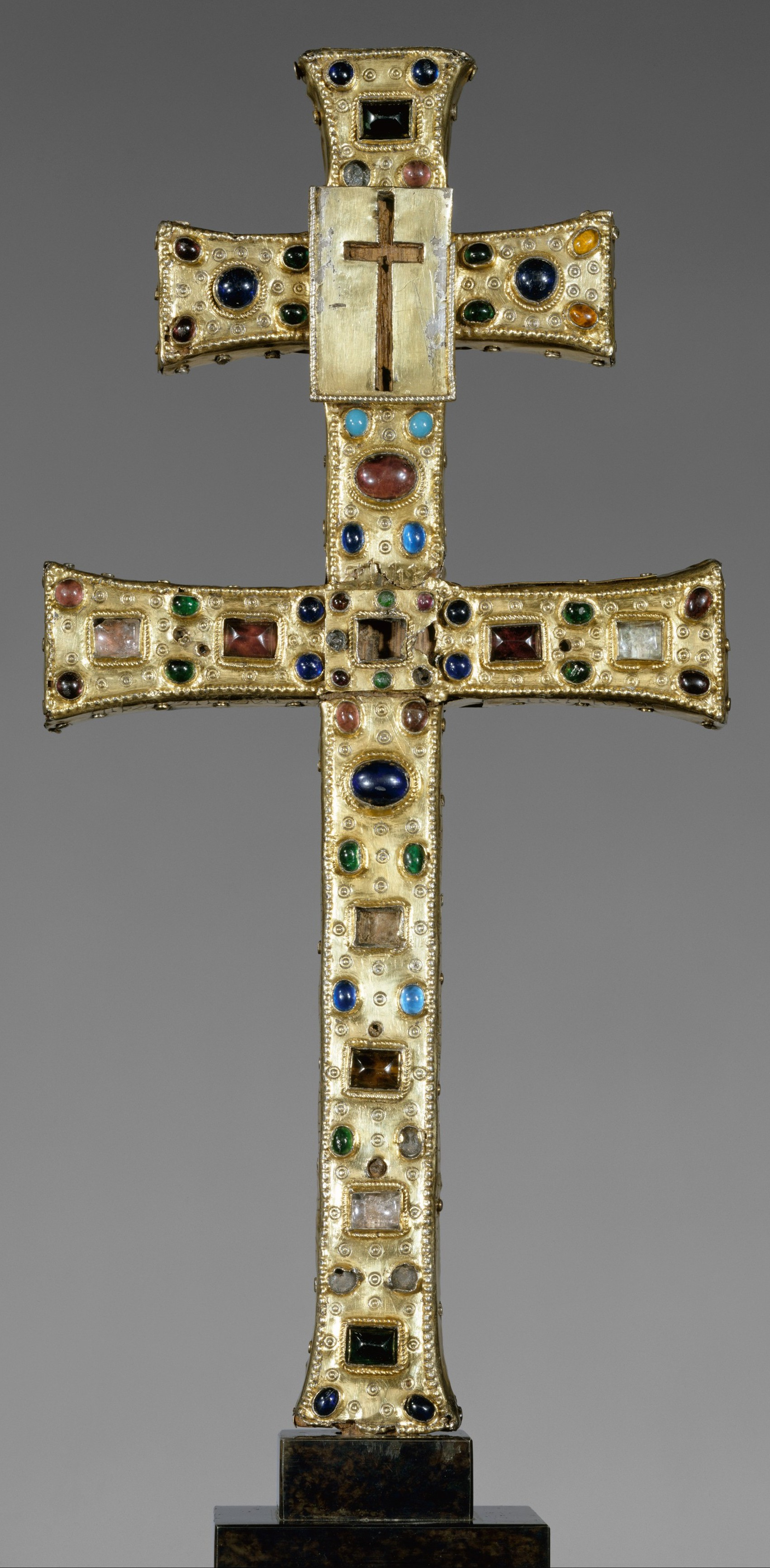
Reliquary Cross, front view with reliquary plaque. 29.8 × 12.5 × 2.5 cm (11.75 in high), The Cloisters, New York

The Reliquary Cross is a small (29.8 × 12.5 cm) French metalwork sculpture dated c. 1180, now in The Cloisters museum in New York. The reliquary cross is double armed, and made from silver gilt, crystal, beading and twisted wire, with embossed rosettes and a wood core. It contains six sequences of engravings; on either side of the shaft and on the four sides of the lower arms. These were intended to identify the relics contained within.

The cross originates from Limoges, France, possibly from the Grandmont Abbey. It is recorded as having been collection of Félix Doistau in Paris from 1846–1936. It was acquired by the Cloisters in 2002.

== Description ==
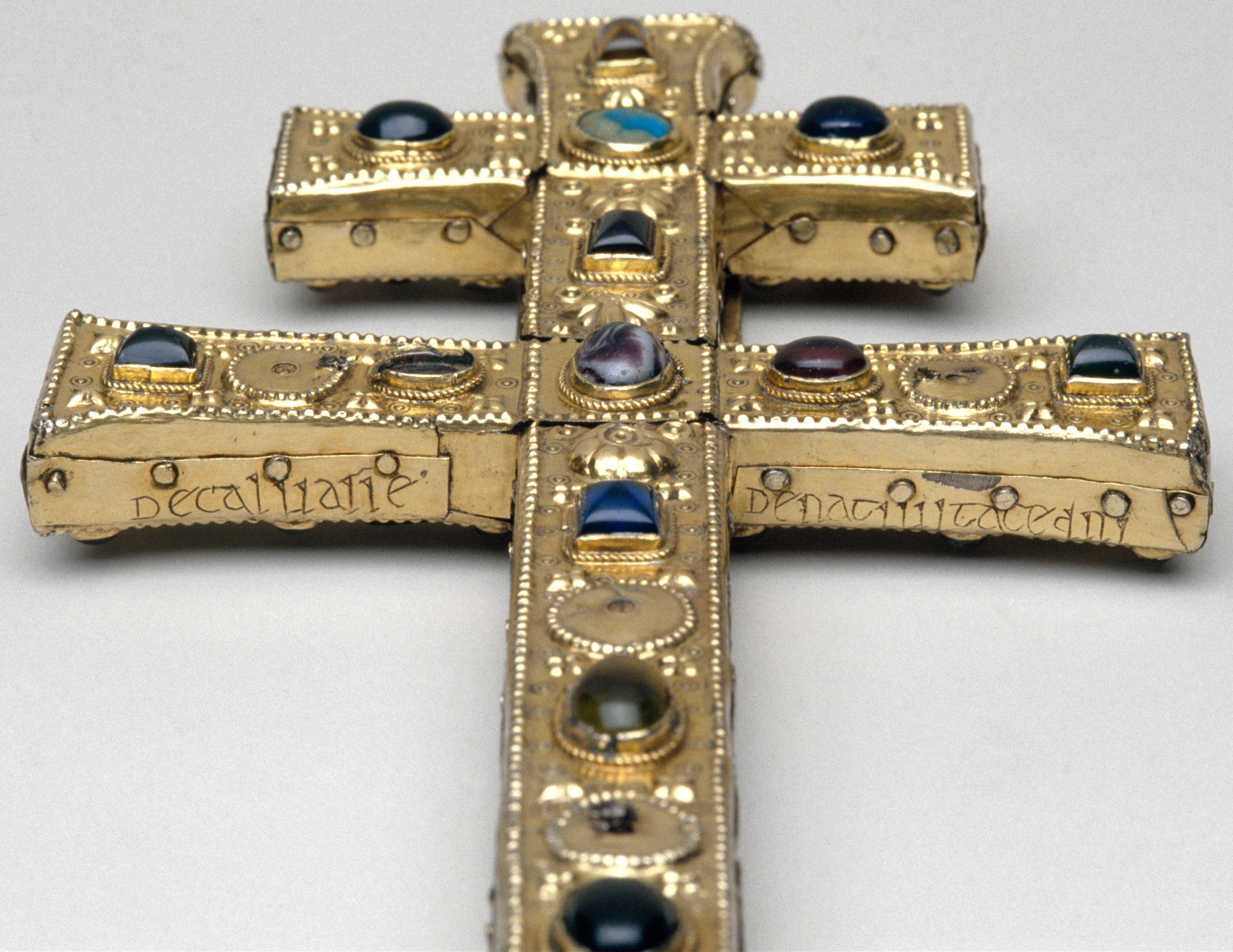
Detail of the inscriptions "De calvarie" (underside, lower left arm) and "De nativitate dñi" (underside, lower right arm).

It is heavily engraved with lettering, and studded on both sides with more than 60 individual glass cabochons (faux coloured gemstones). Two prominent examples on the reverse emulate turquoise and sardonyx stone. These closely resemble similar gems of the "Chasse of Ambaza", another renowned Limoges reliquary, while the oddly place inscriptions are also a feature of contemporary sculpture of the region.

The gemstones are probably intended as particular mementos for the region, to signify the devotion of local churchmen and nobility to the Holy Land.

== Inscriptions and relics ==
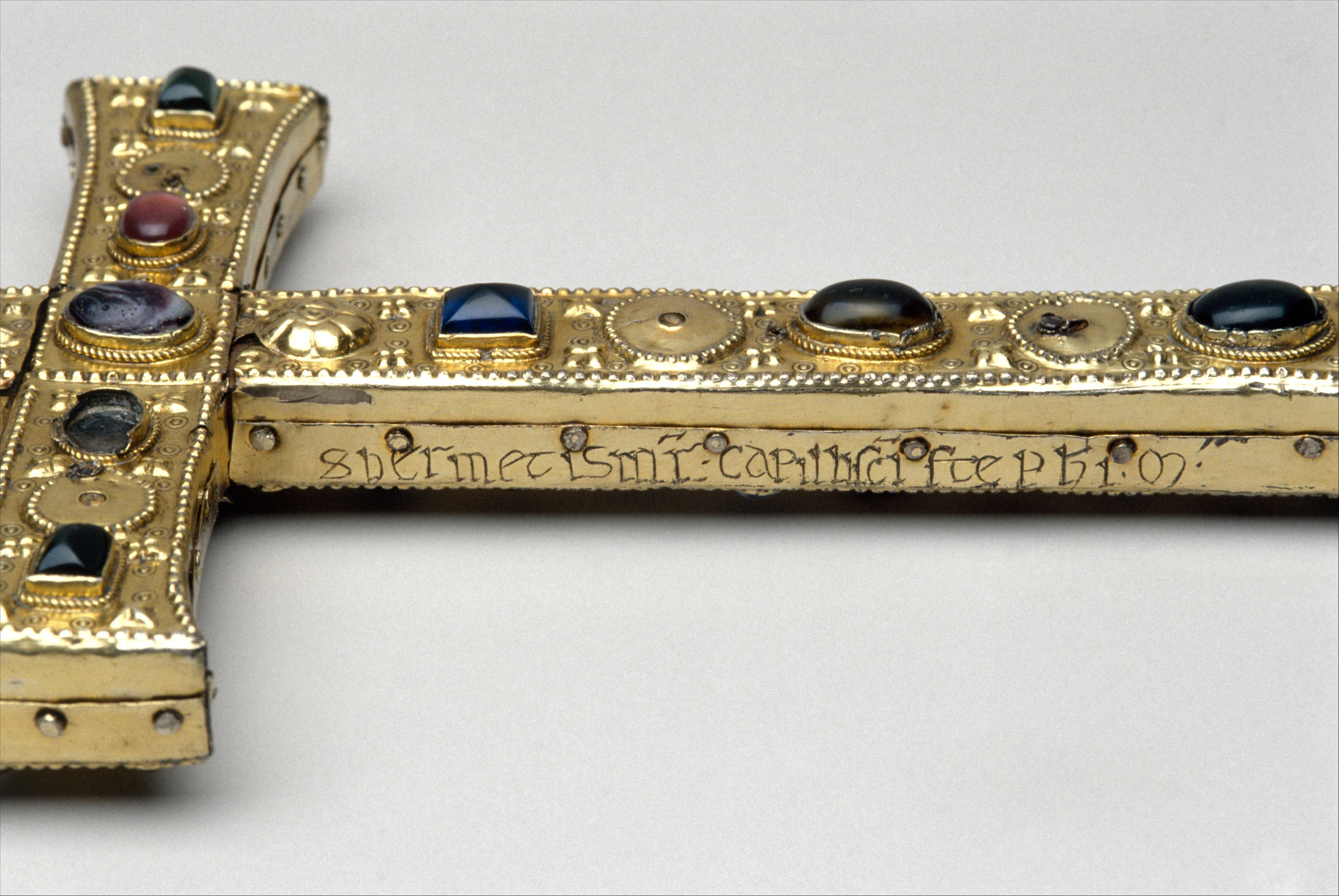
Detail of the reverse, side view

The inscriptions are intended to identify other relics as associated with the massacre of the Innocents, the tomb of Jesus, and the tomb of the Virgin Mary. They include the words "De sepulcro dñi; De sepulcro be Marie" on the right side of the shaft (running up), and the words "S hermetis mi: capilli sci stephi.m" opposite on the left, running down. Unusually, four sets of engravings are set along the upper and lower sides of the lower cross.

The relics are still visible (but barely, they would have originally been far more discernible), and include (assumed) fragments from Jesus' cross, placed behind rock crystal in the rectangular plaque located on the main shaft, prominently set between the two upper cross arms. The plaque contains a smaller cross with a single cross beam.

== Sources ==
- Apollo. "A Selection of 2002 Museum Acquisitions." Apollo: The International Magazine for Collectors, December 2002
- Barnet, Peter; Wu, Nancy. The Cloisters: Medieval Art and Architecture. CT: Yale University Press, 2005. ISBN 978-1-5883-9176-6
- Boehm, Barbara Drake. "Recent Acquisitions, A Selection: 2001–2002". The Metropolitan Museum of Art Bulletin, volume 60, no. 2, Fall, 2002
- Boehm, Barbara Drake; "Jerusalem 1000–1400: Every People Under Heaven". New York: The Metropolitan Museum of Art, 2016
- Dandridge, Pete. "Reconsidering a Romanesque Reliquary Cross." Met Objectives: Treatment and Research Notes, volume 4, no. 1, 2002
