= Reliquary =

Container for religious relics

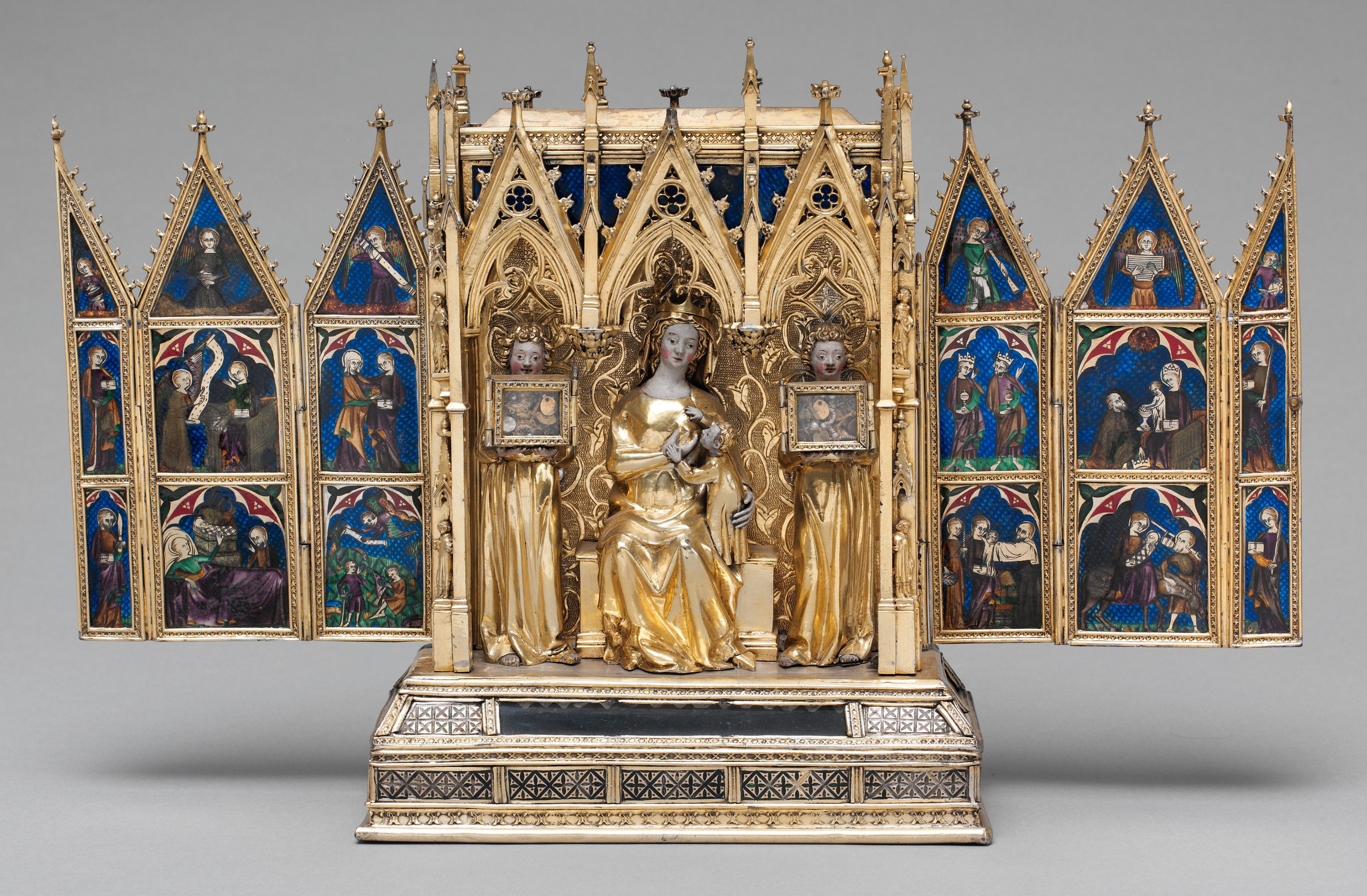
Reliquary Shrine, French, c. 1325–50, The Cloisters, New York

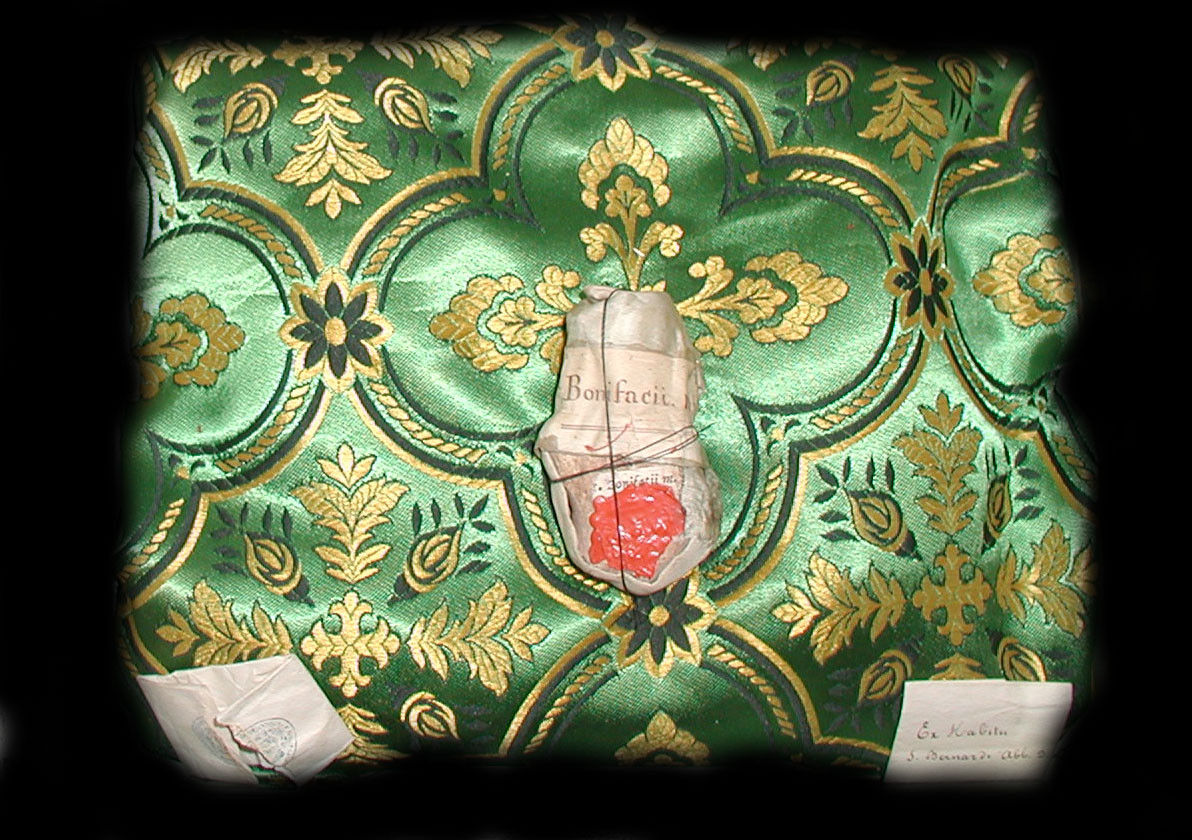
Inside the shrine of St. Boniface of Dokkum in the hermit-church of Warfhuizen in the Netherlands. The little folded paper on the left contains a bone fragment of Saint Benedict of Nursia, the folded paper on the right a piece of the habit of St. Bernard of Clairvaux. The large bone in the middle (about 5 cm in length) is the actual relic of St. Boniface.

A reliquary (also referred to as a shrine, chasse, or phylactery) is a container for relics. A portable reliquary, or the room in which one is stored, may also be called a feretory. A brooch-like container for a very small relic may be called a "theca".

Relics may be the purported or actual physical remains of saints, and may comprise bones, pieces of clothing, or some object associated with saints or with other religious figures. Objects owned or touched by the figure may be called "contact relics". The authenticity of any given relic is often a matter of debate; for that reason, some churches require documentation of a relic's provenance.

Relics have long been important to Buddhists, Christians, Hindus, and to followers of many other religions. These cultures often display reliquaries in shrines, churches, or temples to which the faithful make pilgrimages to gain blessings.

The term is sometimes used in a looser sense to mean a container for the remains of any important figure, even non-religious ones. In particular, the kings of France often specified that their hearts and sometimes other organs be buried in a different location from their body.

== In Christianity ==
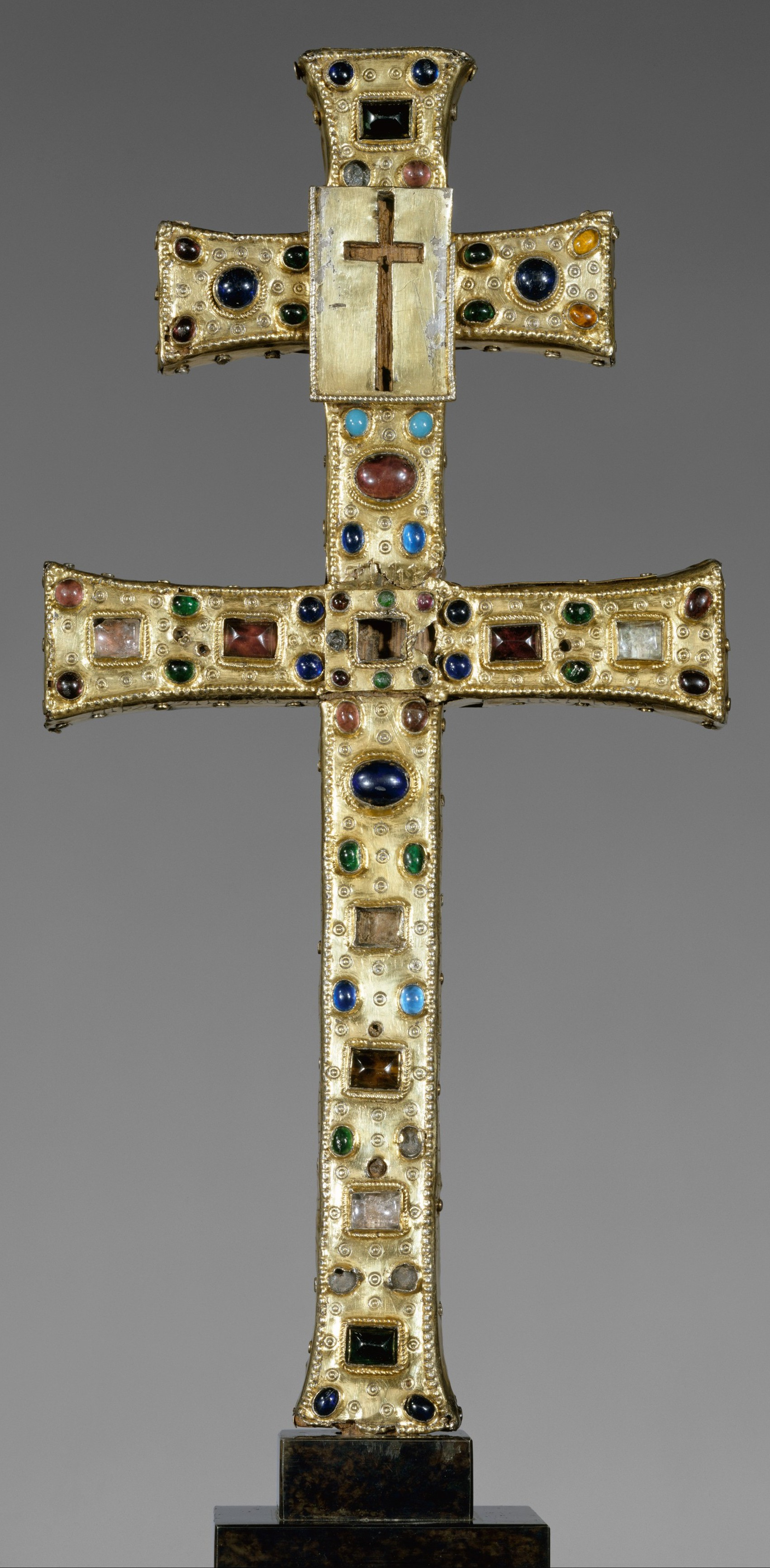
Reliquary Cross, French, c. 1180

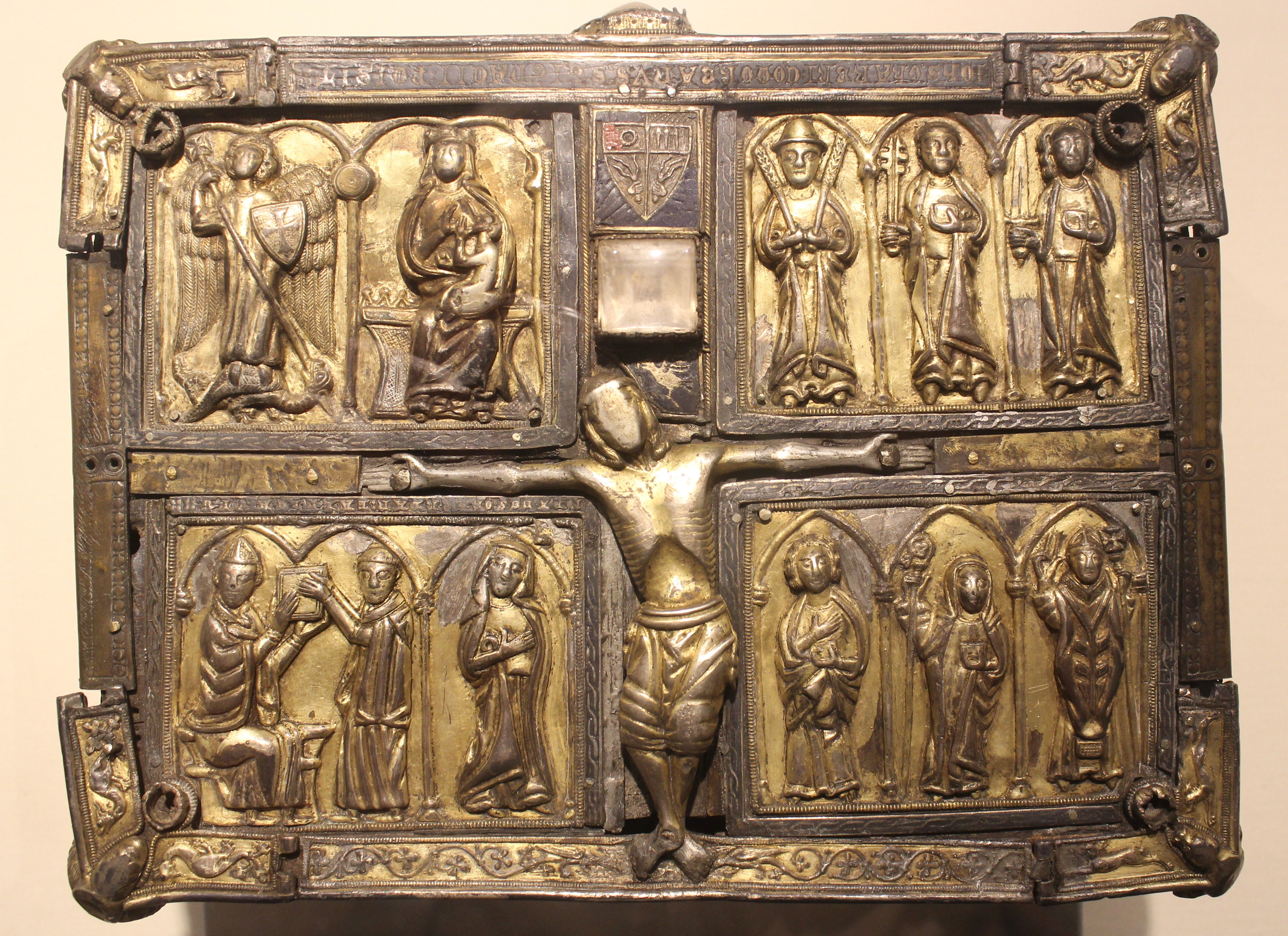
Domnach Airgid, Irish, 8th–9th century, added to 14th century, 15th century, and after

The use of reliquaries became an important part of Christian practices from at least the 4th century, initially in the Eastern Churches, which adopted the practice of moving and dividing the bodies of saints much earlier than the West, probably in part because the new capital of Constantinople, unlike Rome, lacked buried saints. Relics are venerated in Oriental Orthodox, Eastern Orthodox, Roman Catholic, and some Anglican Churches. Reliquaries provide a means of protecting and displaying relics. While frequently taking the form of caskets, they range in size from simple pendants or rings to very elaborate ossuaries.

The relics were enshrined in containers crafted of or covered with gold, silver, gems, and enamelled glass. Ivory was widely used in the Middle Ages for reliquaries; its pure white color is an indication of the holy status of its contents. These objects constituted a major form of artistic production across Europe and Byzantium throughout the Middle Ages.

Many were designed with portability in mind, often being exhibited in public or carried in procession on the saint's feast day or on other holy days. Pilgrimages often centered on the veneration of relics. The faithful often venerate relics by bowing before the reliquary or kissing it; those churches that observe the veneration of relics distinguish between the honor given to the saints and the worship that is due to God alone (see Second Council of Nicea).

Sixteenth-century reformers such as Martin Luther opposed the use of relics since many had no proof of historical authenticity and objected to a cult of saints. Many reliquaries, particularly in northern Europe, were destroyed by Calvinists or Calvinist sympathizers during the Reformation, being melted down or pulled apart to recover precious metals and gems. Nonetheless, the use and manufacture of reliquaries continue to this day, especially in Roman Catholic and Orthodox Christian countries.

=== Forms ===
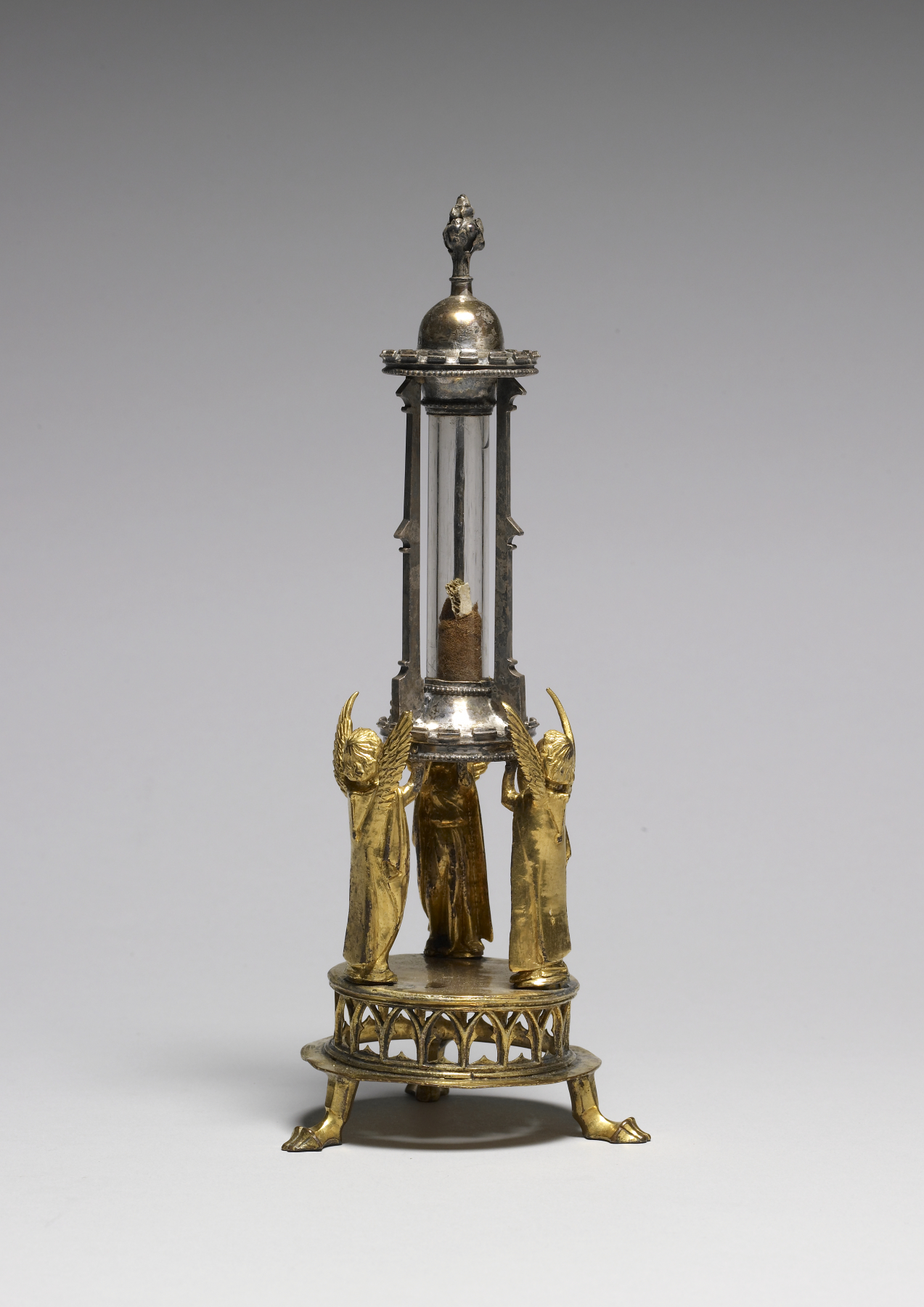
Franco-Flemish Gothic philatory for a finger bone, late 15th century, Walters Art Museum

The earliest reliquaries were essentially boxes, either simply box-shaped or based on an architectural design, taking the form of a model of a church with a pitched roof. These latter are known as chasse (from French châsse), and typical examples from the 12th to 14th century have wooden frameworks with gilt-copper plaques nailed on, decorated in champlevé enamel. Limoges was the largest production centre.

Relics of the True Cross became very popular from the 9th century onward and were housed in magnificent gold and silver cross-shaped reliquaries decorated with enamels and precious stones. From about the end of the 10th century, reliquaries in the shape of the relics they housed also became popular; hence, for instance, the skull of Pope Alexander I was housed in a head-shaped reliquary. Similarly, the bones of saints were often housed in reliquaries that recalled the shape of the original body part, such as an arm or a foot.

Many Eastern Orthodox reliquaries housing tiny pieces of relics have circular or cylindrical slots in which small disks of wax-mastic are placed, in which the actual relic is embedded.

A philatory is a transparent reliquary designed to contain and exhibit the bones and relics of saints. This style of reliquary has a viewing portal to view the relic inside. The feretrum was a medieval form of reliquary or shrine containing the sacred effigies and relics of a saint.

During the later Middle Ages, the monstrance form, primarily used for consecrated hosts, was sometimes used for reliquaries. These housed the relic in a rock crystal, or glass capsule mounted on a column above a base, enabling the relic to be displayed to the faithful. Reliquaries in the form of large pieces of metalwork jewellery also appeared around this time, housing tiny relics such as pieces of the Holy Thorn, notably the Holy Thorn Reliquary now in the British Museum.

Forms of reliquaries in Christianity

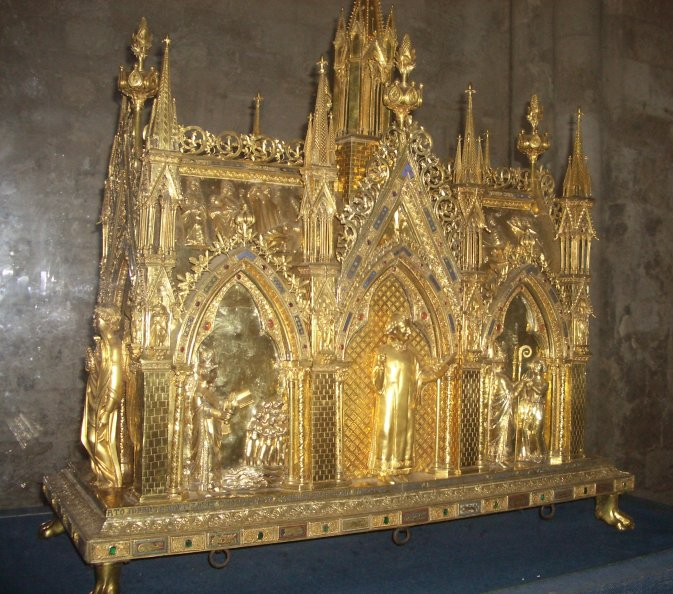
Box reliquary/chasse of St. Taurin

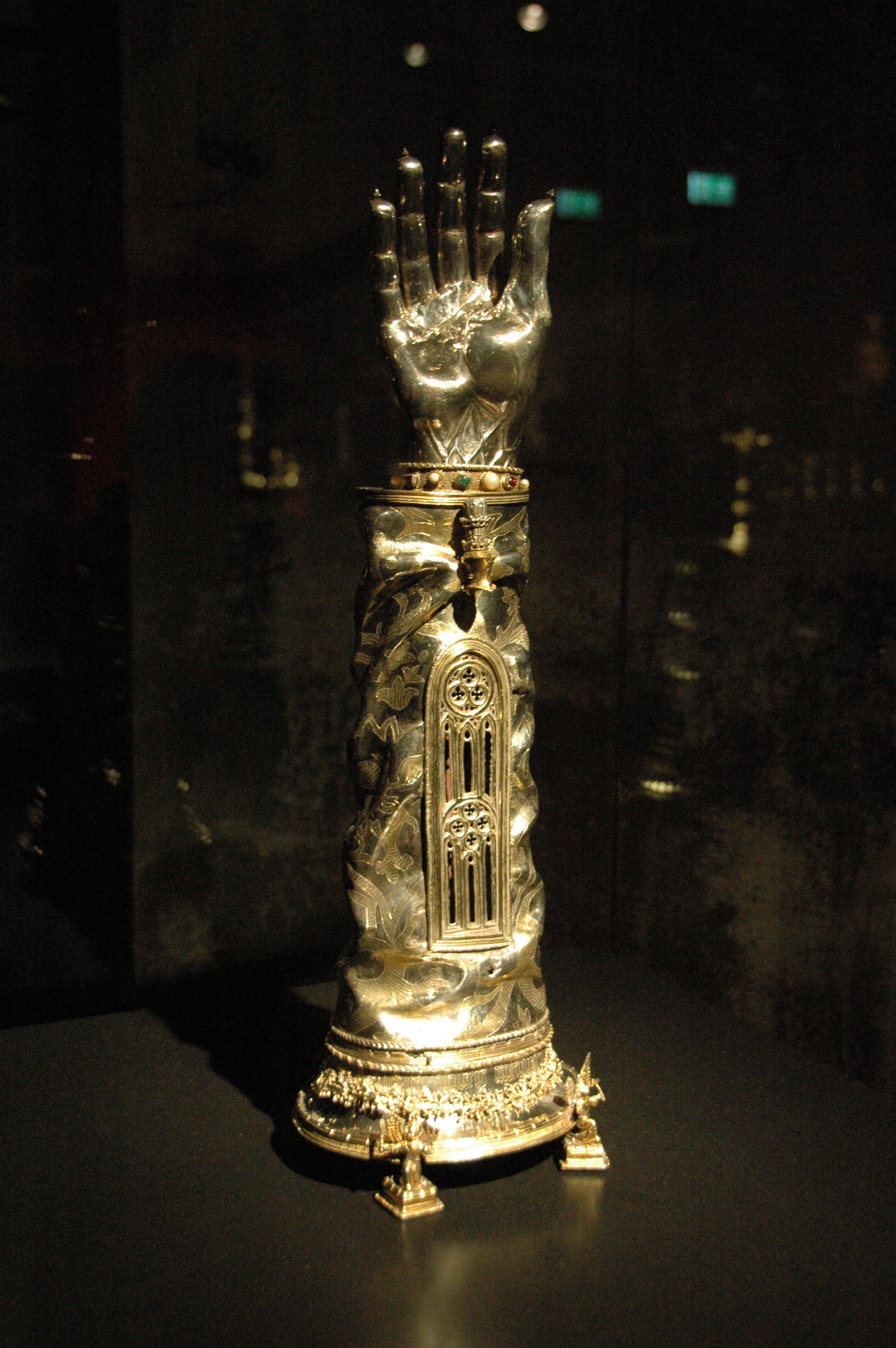
The Arm reliquary of Margaret of Castell

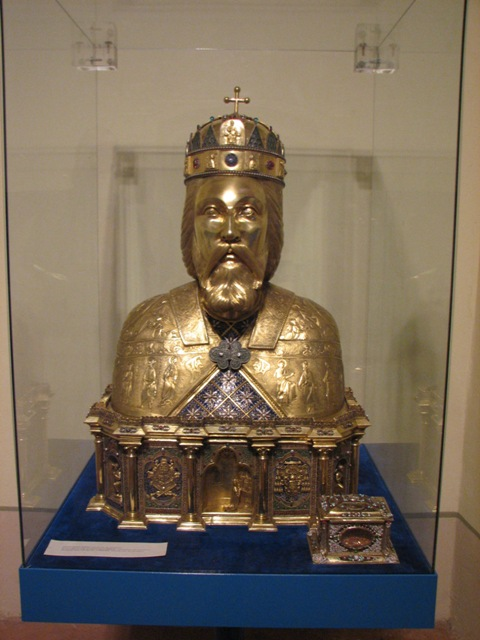
Head reliquary

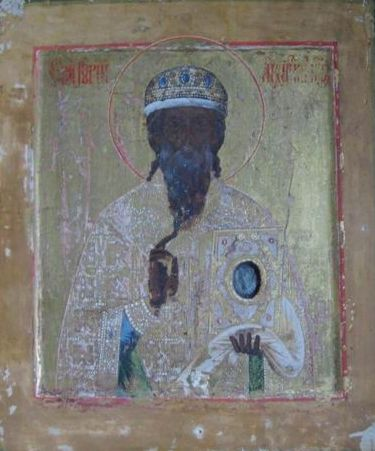
Icon of St. Guriy of Kazan, with a relic embedded in it (19th century).

== In Buddhism ==
In Buddhism, stupas are an important form of a reliquary and may be buried inside larger structures such as a stupa or chorten. Particularly in China and throughout East and Southeast Asia, these take the form of a pagoda; in Japan, this is known as a tō.

Two famous very early excavated reliquaries are the 1st-century Bimaran Casket and the Kanishka Casket of 127 AD, both believed to have contained part of the cremated remains of Gautama Buddha. Relics associated with Buddha are the most important in Buddhism, but those related to other enlightened figures like Sariputta and Moggallana are also highly revered.

In Buddhism, relics are known as cetiya; one of the most significant is the relic of the tooth of the Buddha in Sri Lanka. In Japan, Buddhist relics are known as shari (舎利; from Sanskrit śarīra), and are often stored in a shariden (舎利殿; relic hall, reliquary). (See also: Japanese Buddhist architecture) The Golden Pavilion at Kinkaku-ji in Kyoto is a well-known example of a shariden.

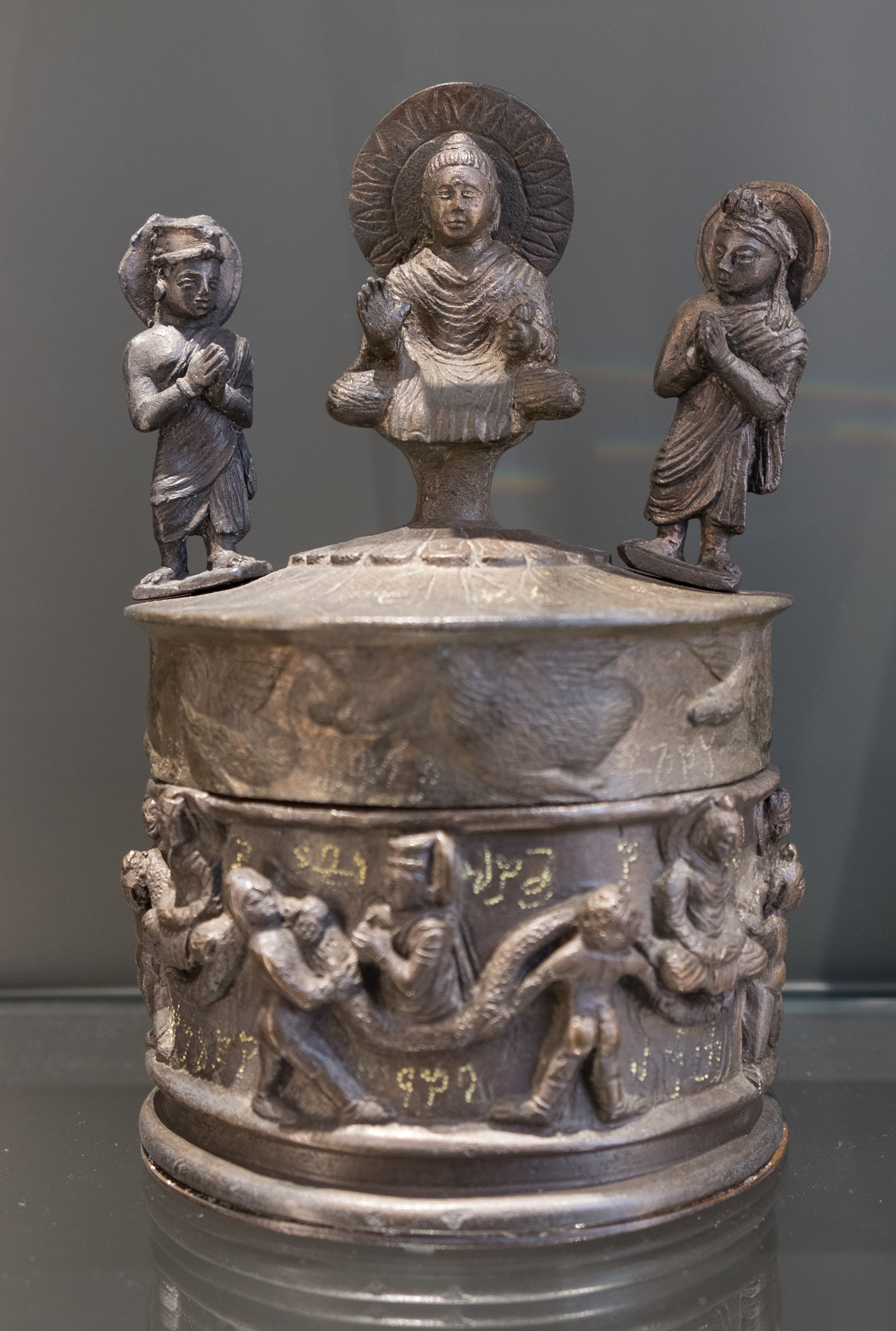
Buddhist reliquary in Kanishka Stupa

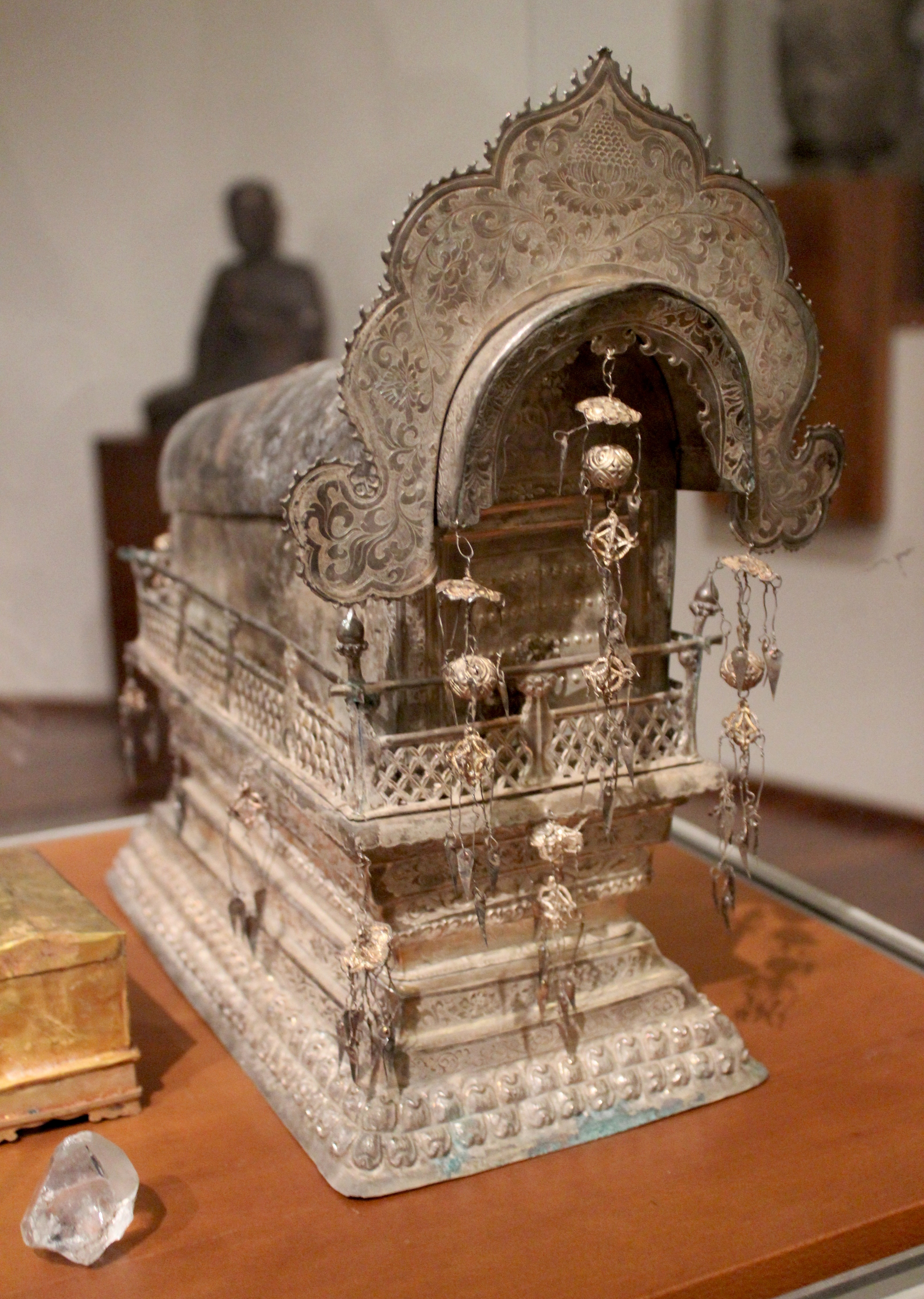
Buddhist reliquary, Song dynasty

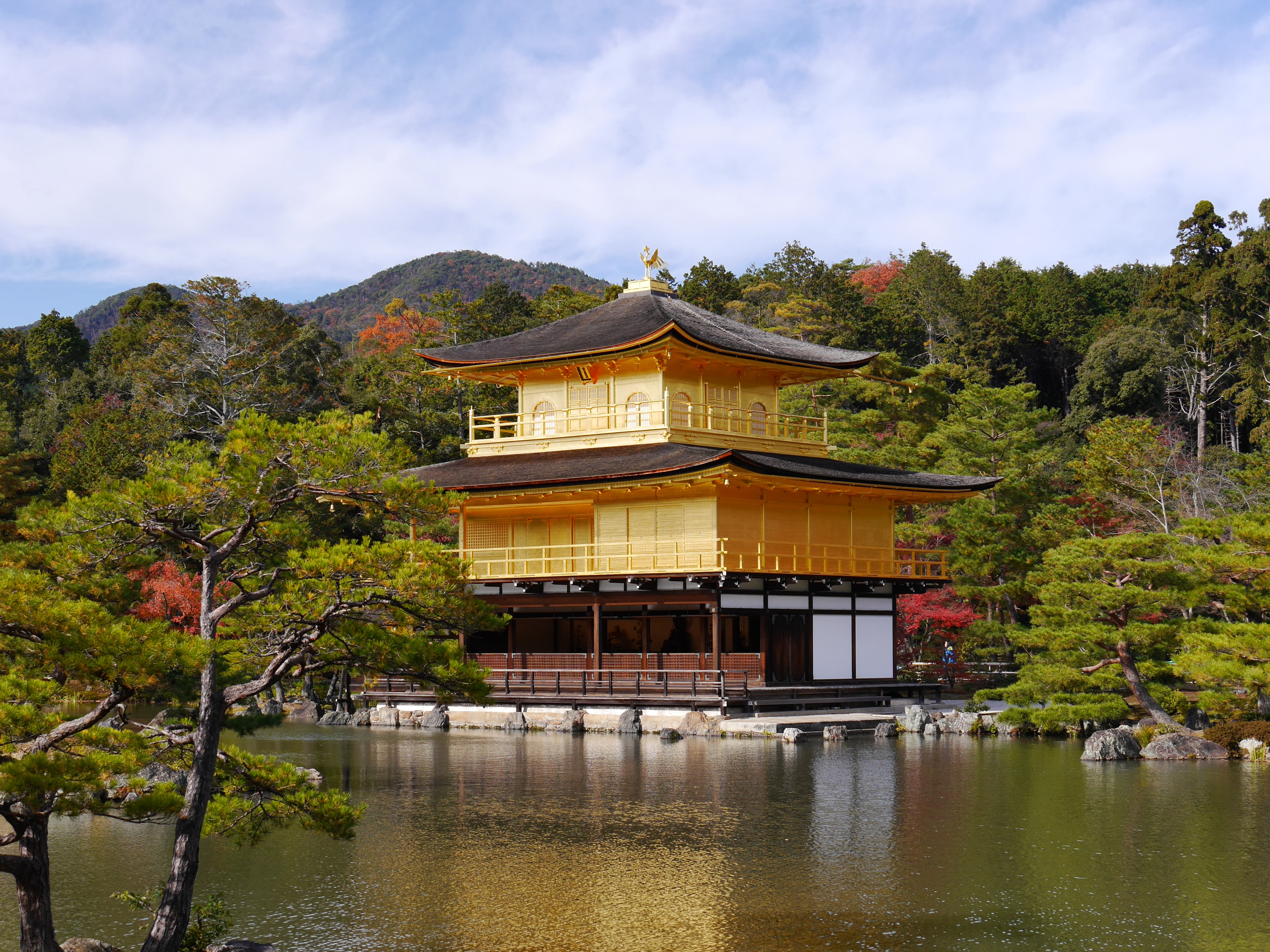
Shariden at Kinkaku-ji, Kyoto, Japan

== See also ==
- Cetiya
- Ennabeuren reliquary
- Essen-Werden casket
- Relics of Sariputta and Moggallana
- Shrine of the Three Kings in Cologne Cathedral
