= Ennabeuren reliquary =

8th-century Christian artifact

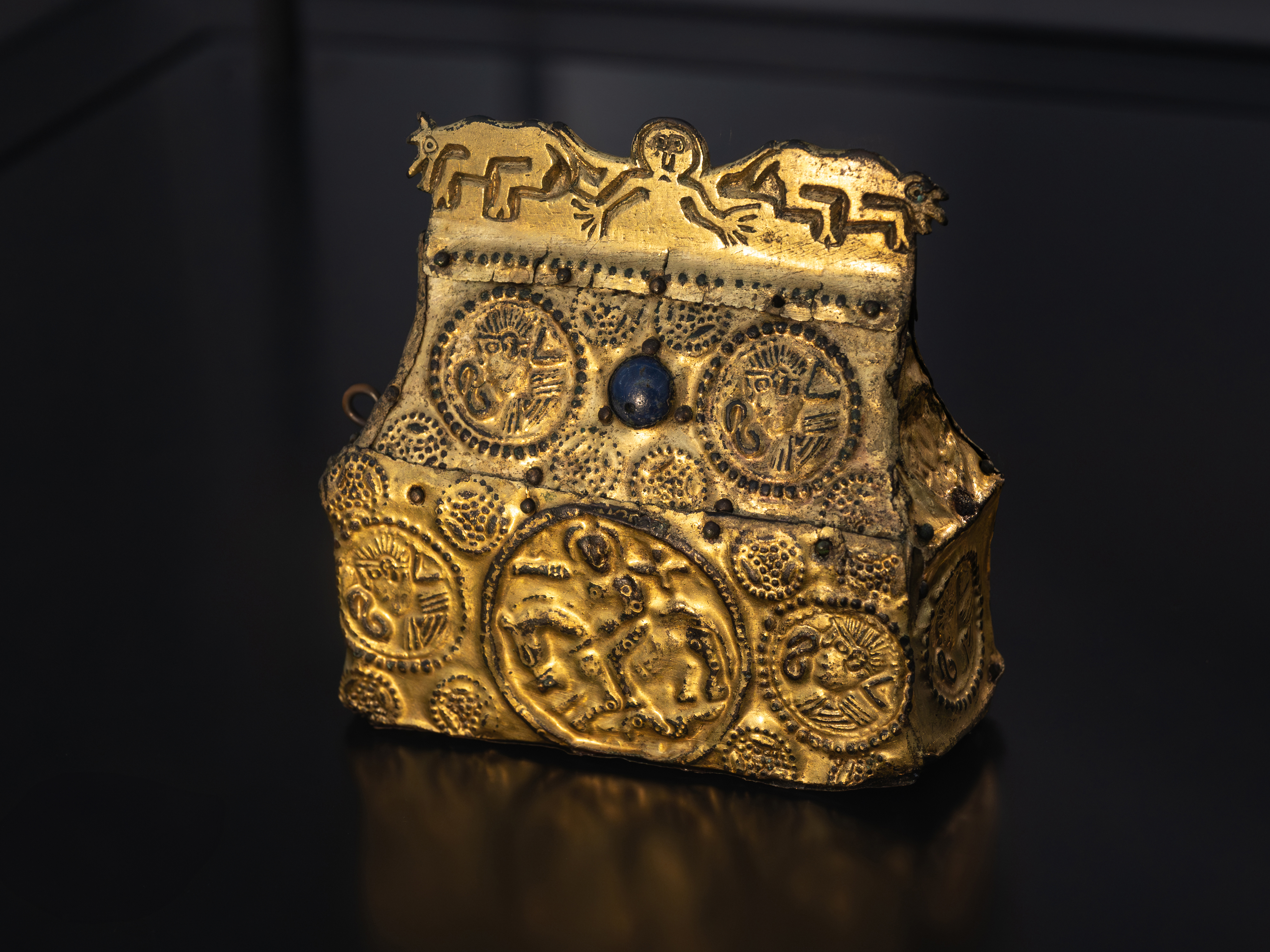
Ennabeuren reliquary

The Ennabeuren reliquary is a Christian reliquary found buried under the altar of a parish church in Ennabeuren, Alb-Donau-Kreis. The reliquary dates from the mid-7th century to the early 8th century. The reliquary is made out of limewood and covered in gilded copper. German archeologist Dieter Quast has written a monograph on the reliquary arguing for pagan influences on its design.

== Gallery ==
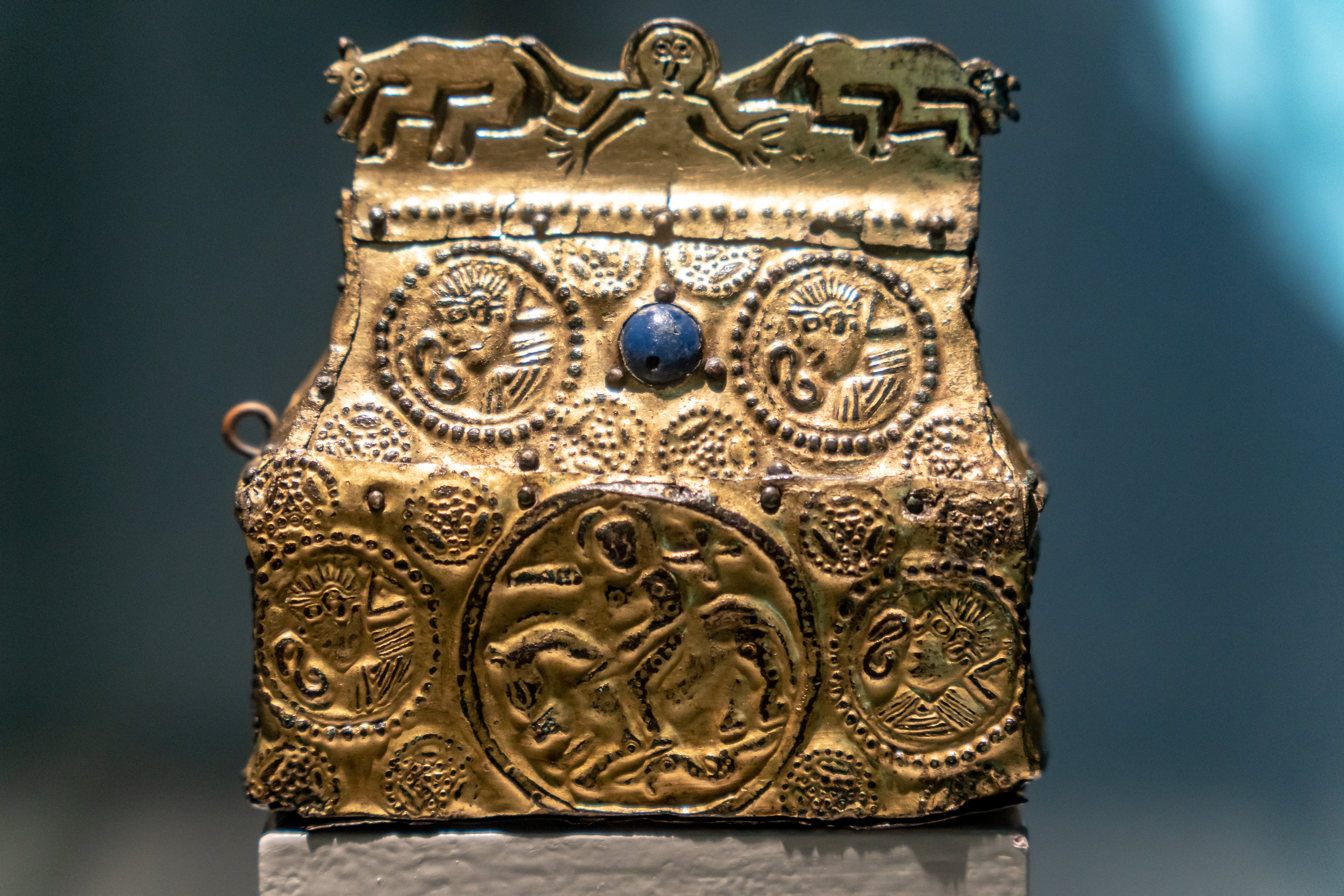

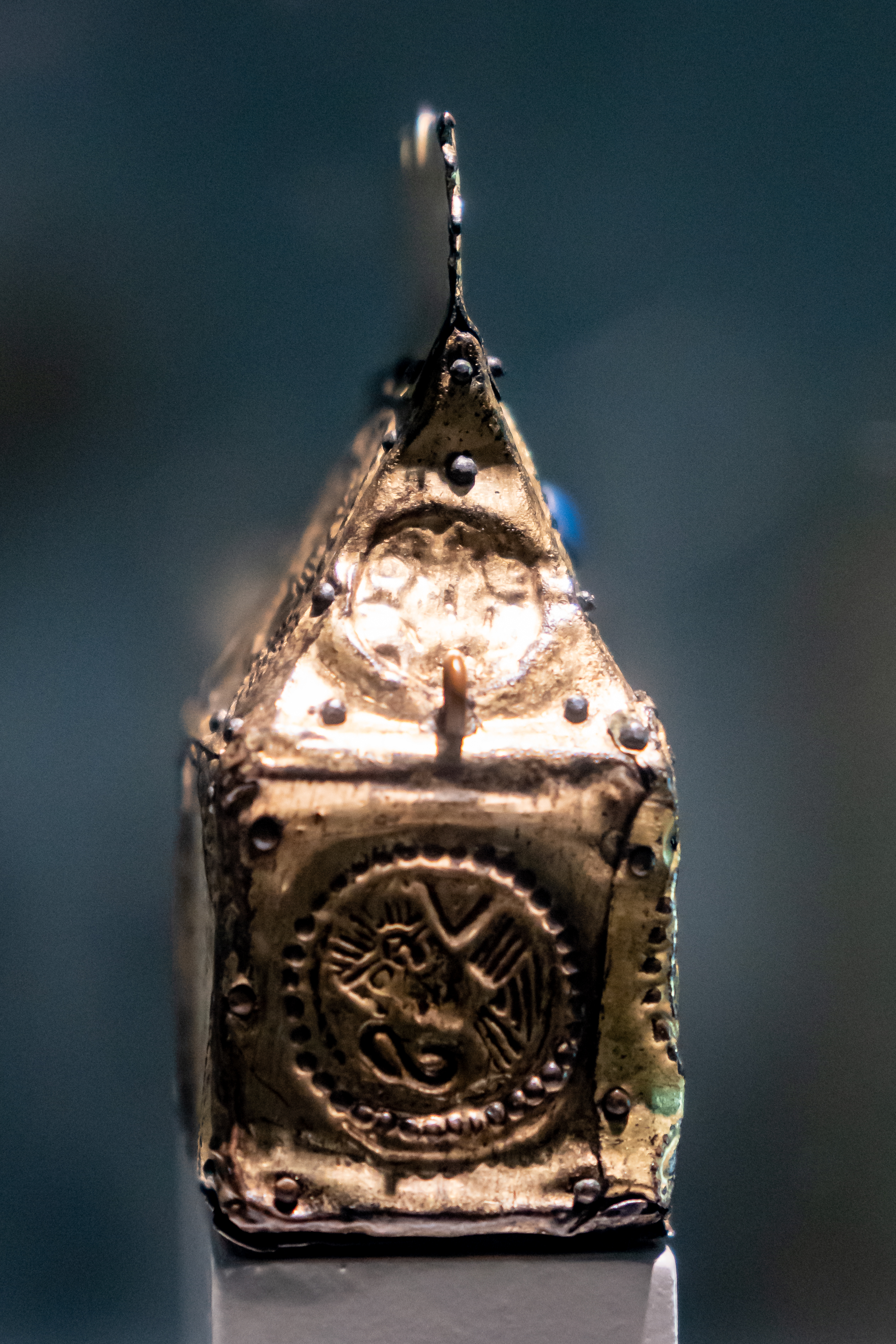

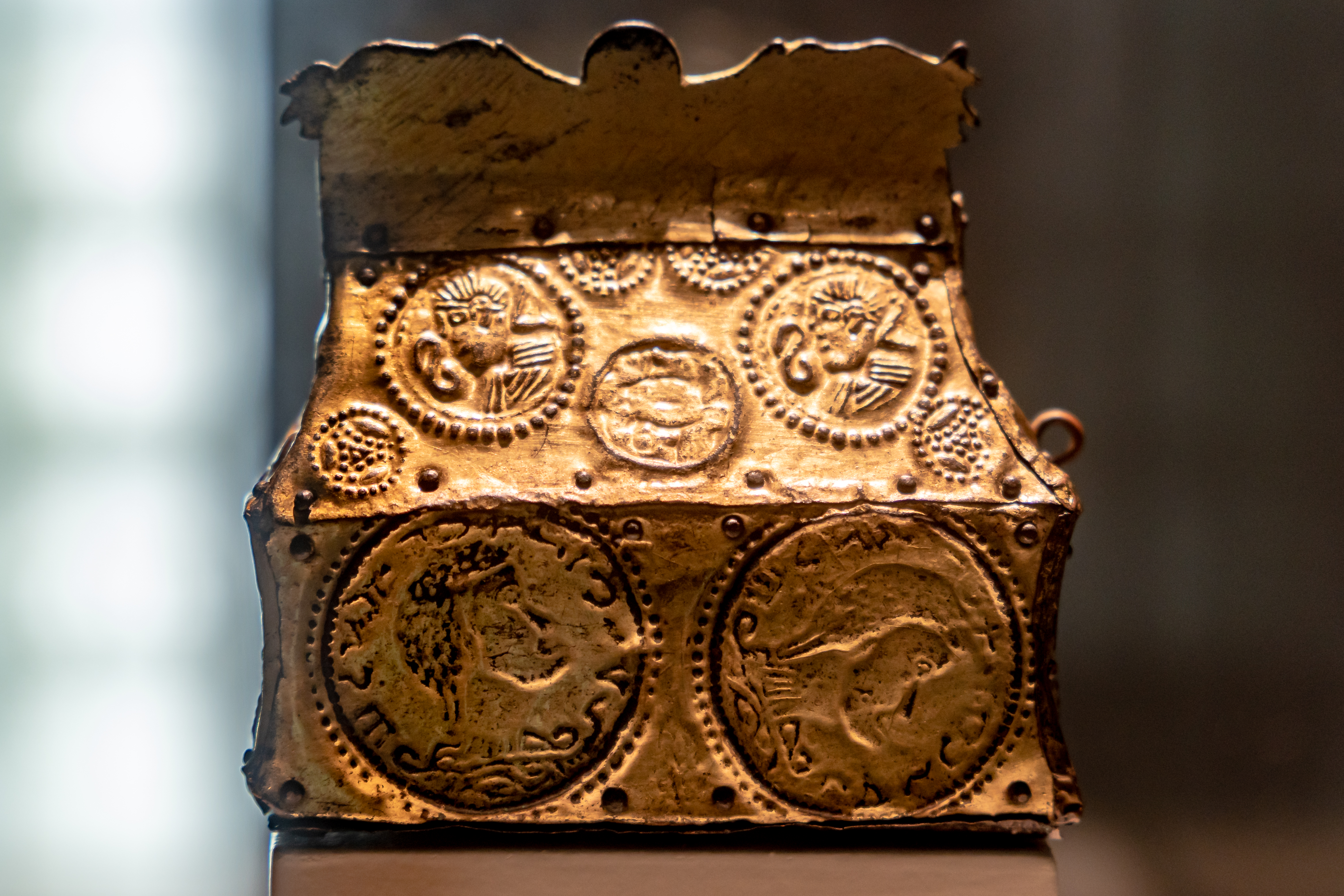

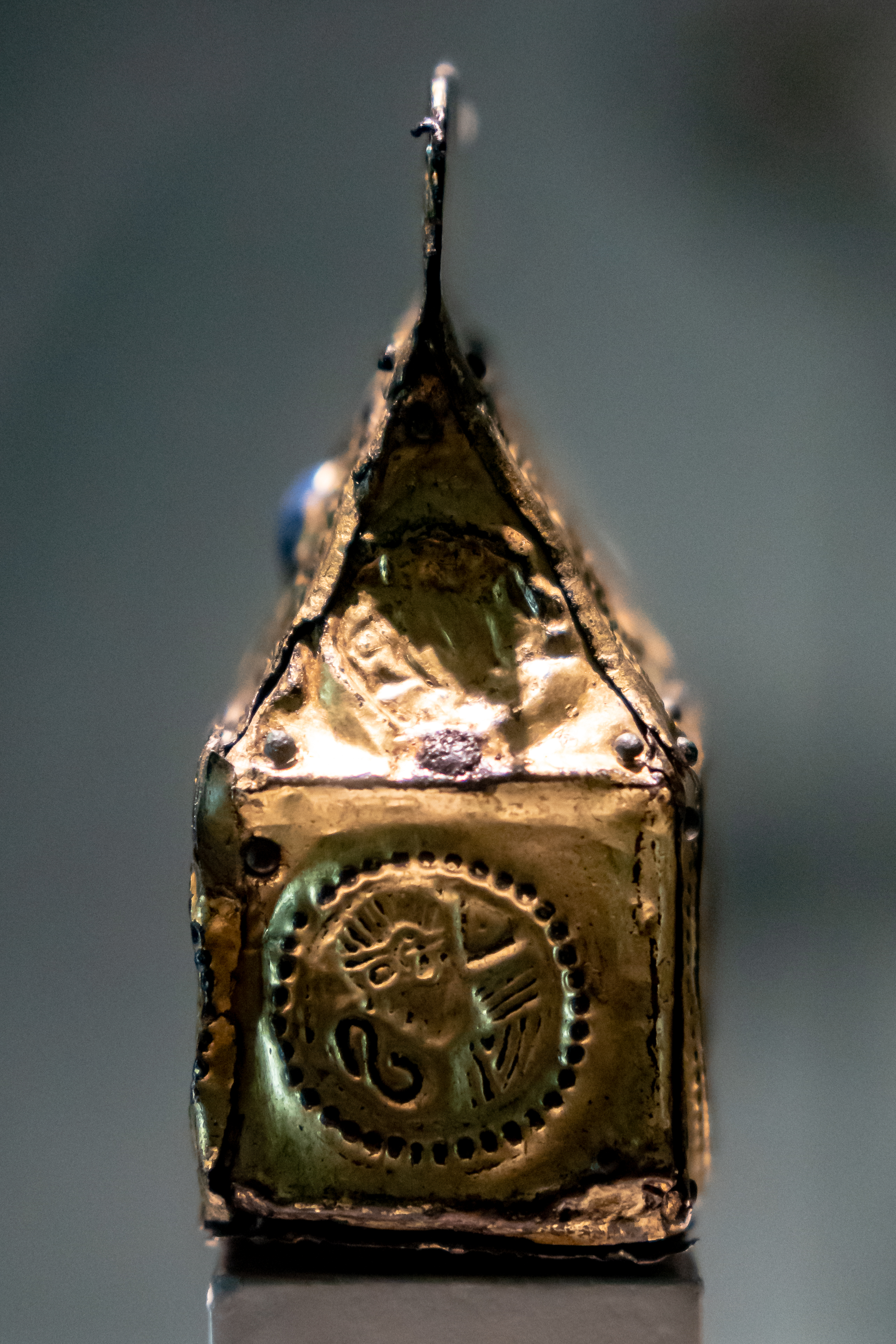

== See also ==
- Essen-Werden casket
