= Essen Stadtwald station =

Railway station in Essen, Germany

Essen Stadtwald
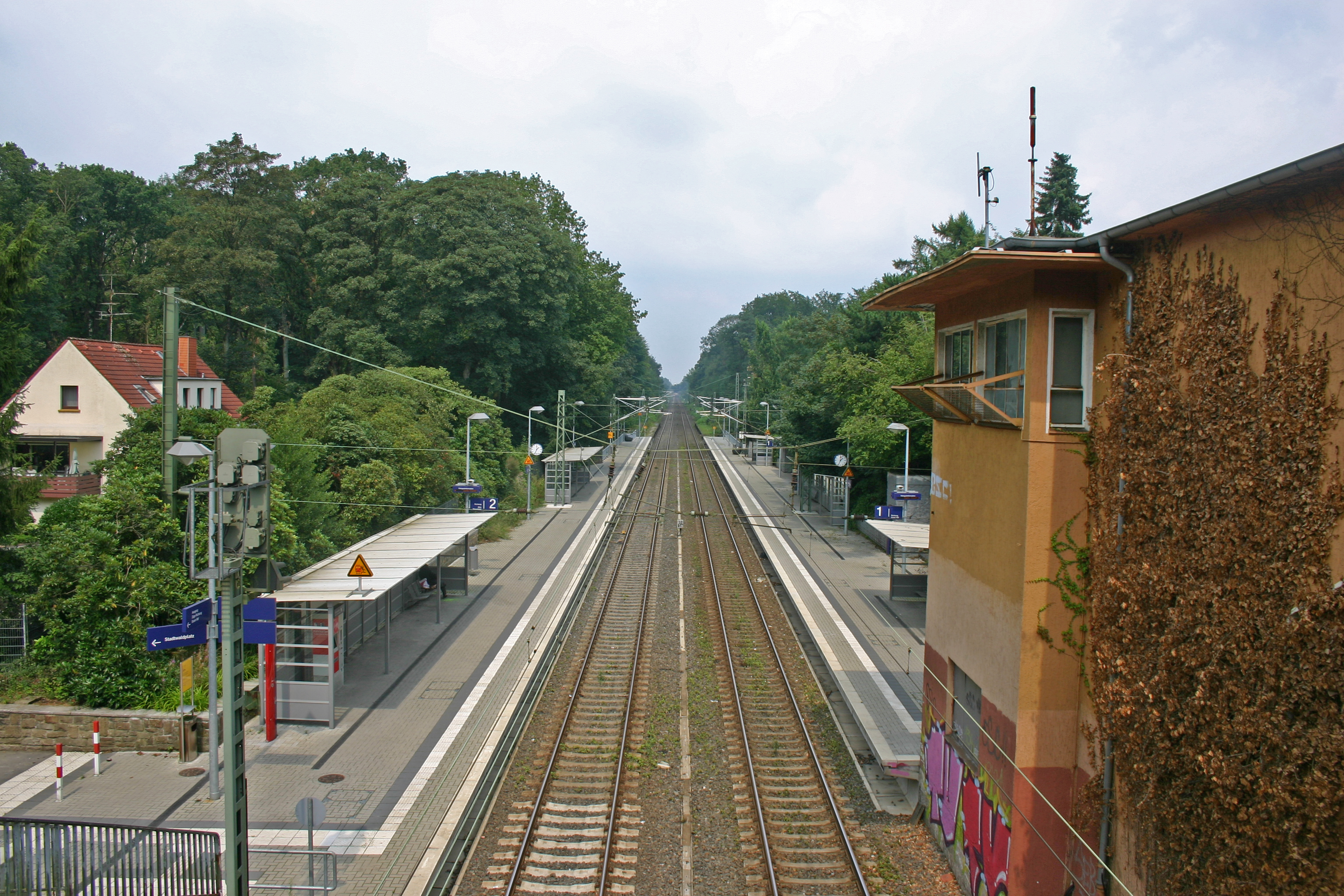
- Essen Stadtwald station in 2014

General information
- Location: Stadtwaldwende 27, Essen, NRW; Germany
- Coordinates: 51°25′21″N 7°01′24″E
- Lines: Essen-Werden–Essen (KBS 450.6)
- Platforms: 2

Construction
- Accessible: Yes

Other information
- Station code: 1691
- DS100 code: EESA
- IBNR: 8001896
- Category: 5
- Fare zone: VRR: 358
- Website: www.bahnhof.de

History
- Opened: 15 August 1877

Services
Preceding station	Rhine-Ruhr S-Bahn	Following station
Essen-Hügel towards Köln-Nippes	S6	Essen Süd towards Essen Hbf
Location

Essen Stadtwald is located on the Essen-Werden–Essen railway, close to a single-track tunnel, the Stadtwald Tunnel. It is in the Essen district of Stadtwald in the German state of North Rhine Westphalia.

== History ==
The station with opened on 15 August 1877 with the Essen-Werden–Essen railway, which connects the Ruhr Valley Railway to the Essen Hauptbahnhof, under the name of Rellinghausen BM, with BM standing for the Bergisch-Märkische Railway Company. Another station called Rellinghausen was opened in 1879 further east on the Mülheim-Heißen–Altendorf (Ruhr) railway (on which passenger services were abandoned in 1965 and the line was subsequently closed). In 1897, Rellinghausen BM station was renamed Rellinghausen West, well after the nationalisation and dissolution of the Bergisch-Märkische Railway in 1886.

Rellinghausen was incorporated into the city of Essen in 1910 and the station has since been in the district of Essen-Stadtwald. As a result, the station received its current name of Essen Stadtwald on 1 January 1911.

== Current situation ==
The station is now served S6 line of the Rhine-Ruhr S-Bahn and lies on the Essen-Werden–Essen railway. The owner of the property is DB Station&Service, which classified it as a category 5 station.

The two platforms are connected by a pedestrian overpass to the station building, which was built postwar and is located to the east of the tracks. Heading towards the south, the line runs through the 248 metre-long, single-track tunnel under Stadtwaldplatz.

== Operations ==
The station is served only by line S6 of the Rhine-Ruhr S-Bahn at 20-minute intervals.
