= Essen-Werden casket =

8th-century oak and walrus ivory box

External image
- Drawing of the carved panels after Staude's 1981 reconstruction of the casket.

The Essen-Werden casket is a reliquary casket of St Liudger Church in Essen-Werden. The casket is supposed to have originally served as a container for a small part of the wood from the cross of Jesus, which St Liudger (742–809) had received from the Pope in Rome in 784.

The casket is an oaken lidded box and measures 40 cm by 21.2 cm by 21.2 cm. Carved rectangular openwork panels on the casket are made of walrus ivory. The decorations on the casket have been assigned a wide range of dates between the 7th and 11th centuries, though scholarly opinion clusters around the late 7th and 8th centuries. These decorations were once nailed onto the casket in a disarray, as a result of makeshift repairs over the centuries which had been used to cover up damage to the decorations and to the box.

The Essen-Werden casket undergone several successive reconstruction attempts. Wilhelm Effmann made the first attempt in 1901. He reconstructed a single crucifixion scene from the ivory panels and went no further than this. Victor H. Elbern made a detailed study of the casket and attempted a reconstruction between 1956 and 1962. Erich Schumacher's 1981 reconstruction largely agreed with Elbern's. In 1982 the casket was reconstructed by Hilmar Staude, employee of the Römisch-Germanisches Zentralmuseum, Mainz. Staude's reconstruction is the most recent and most complete.

The casket has three carved panels. The following description of their features follows the reconstruction of Staude. Each panel has some space filled with geometric patterns of crosses and holes. The front panel has three figures, two winged angels and Christ, his head backed by three arms of the cross. All three figures are in orans posture and the negative space around them is filled with animals. The lid panel shows Christ's crucifixion. Christ' head is again backed with three arms of the cross, now decorated with the letters "REX". Two cramped human figures are visible under Christ's outstretched arms. The left figure bears a sponge and the right a spear, allowing us to identify the figures with Stephaton and Longinus. Once again, the negative space is filled with animals; below and above Christ are symmetrical animal designs. On the back panel, one large animal is flanked by four small animals on either side. All animals are identical (except for in orientation and size). Above the largest animal is a Greek cross.

== See also ==
- Hildesheim Reliquary of Mary
- Brescia Casket
- Ennabeuren reliquary
