= Essen-Werden station =

Railway station in Essen, Germany

Essen Werden
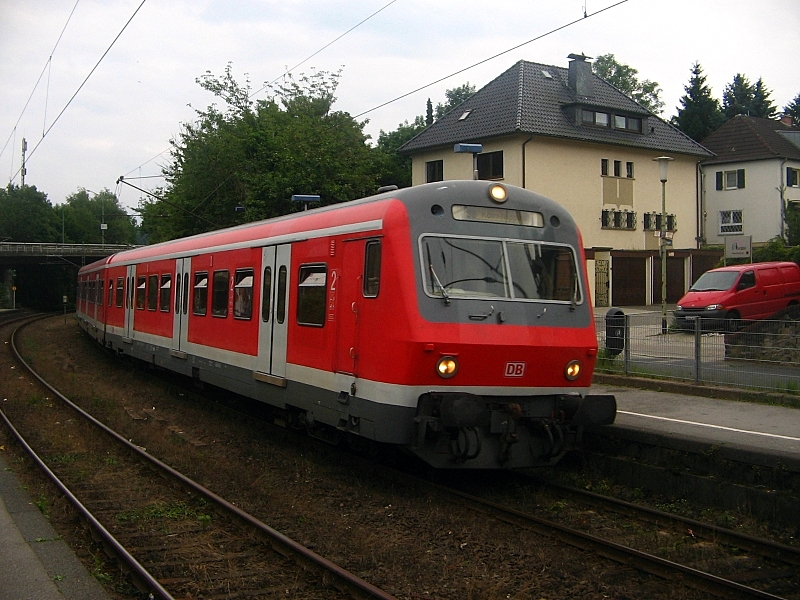

General information
- Location: Im Löwental 11; Essen-Werden, Essen, NRW; Germany
- Coordinates: 51.386824°N 6.997964°E
- Lines: Ruhr Valley Railway; Essen-Werden–Essen
- Platforms: 2

Construction
- Accessible: Yes

Other information
- Station code: 1713
- DS100 code: EEWD
- IBNR: 8001915
- Category: 5
- Fare zone: VRR: 452
- Website: www.bahnhof.de

History
- Opened: 1 February 1872

Key dates
- 1968: S-Bahn service started

Services
Preceding station	Rhine-Ruhr S-Bahn	Following station
Kettwig towards Köln-Nippes	S6	Essen-Hügel towards Essen Hbf
Location

Essen-Werden is a railway station in the city of Essen in western Germany. It serves the southern city borough Werden and is situated on the bank of the river Ruhr at the junction of the Ruhr Valley Railway and the line to Essen.

The station was opened in 1872 as part of the Düsseldorf-Werden-Kupferdreh line of the Bergisch-Märkische Eisenbahn. In 1877, a line to Essen opened. Passenger services on the line to Kupferdreh closed on 29 May 1965.

The station today sees regular service by Rhein-Ruhr S-Bahn trains on the S6 line since 1974. Trains currently run in 20-minute intervals.
