= Werden, Essen =

Borough of Essen, Germany

Coordinates: 51°23.1833′N 6°59.7833′E

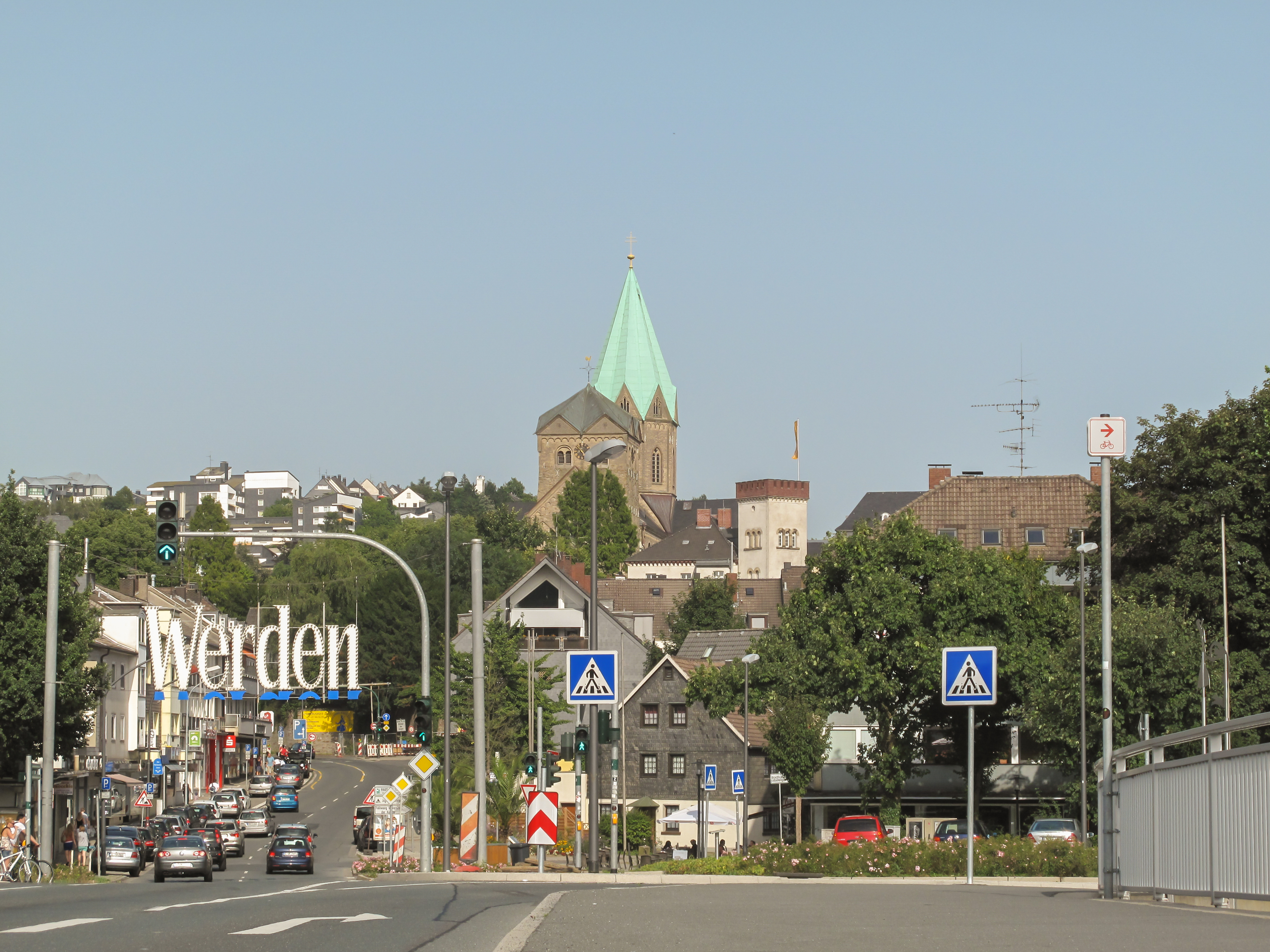
View of the town from the Gustav Heinemann bridge, 2012

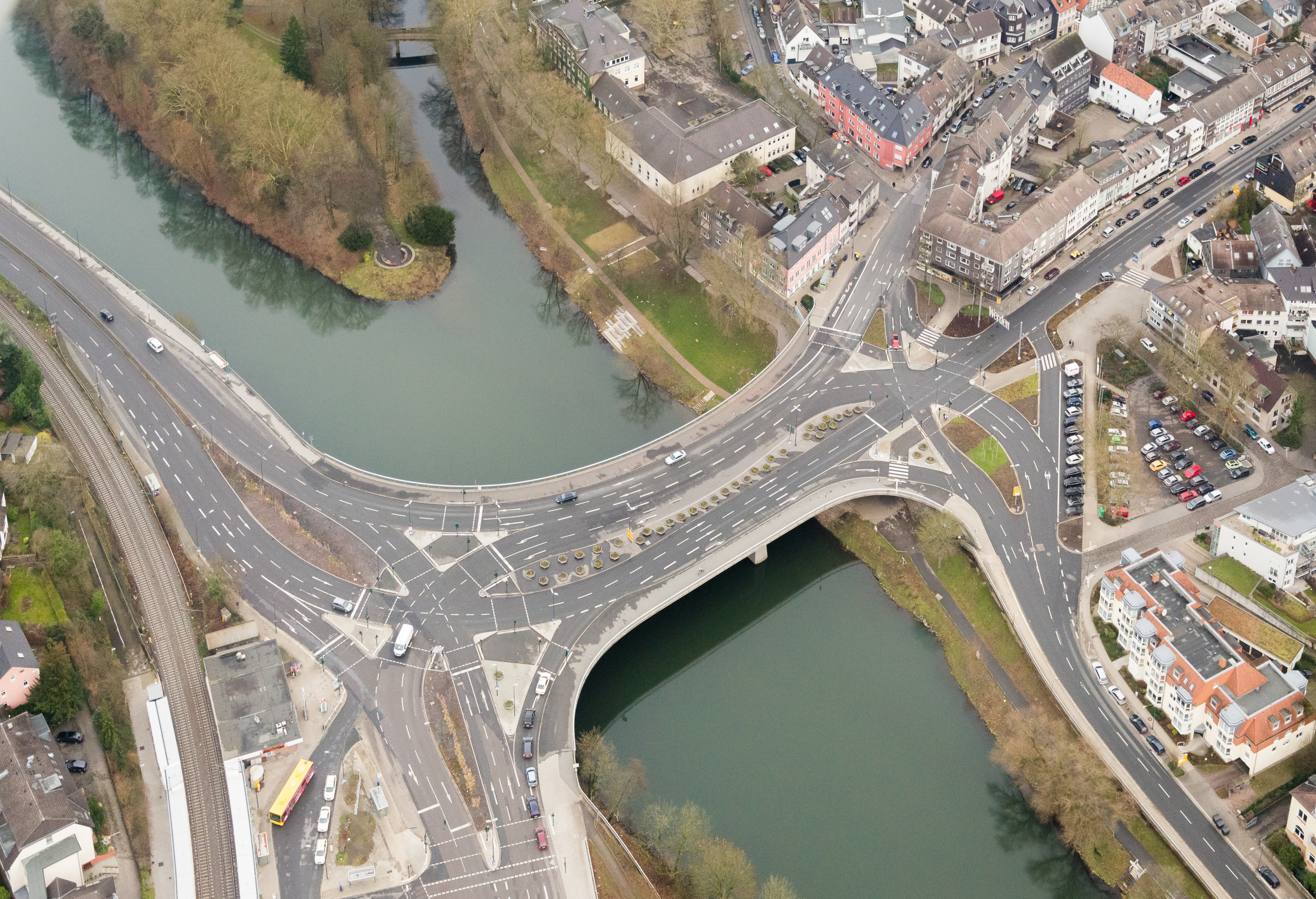
Gustav Heinemann bridge, 2014

Werden (German pronunciation: [ˈvɛʁdn̩]; Westphalian: Wadden) is a southern borough of the city of Essen in Germany. It belongs to the city district IX Werden/Kettwig/Bredeney and has 9,998 inhabitants as of June 30, 2006. The borough occupies a space of 4.04 km^{2} (1.56 sq mi) and is situated at a median height of 58 m above sea level (NN).

The town is home to the Essen-Werden Campus of Folkwang University of the Arts. The Benedictine abbey in central Werden houses Folkwang’s Orchestral Performance conservatory. The jazz building is at Wesselswerth 23, and the White Mill (Weisse Mühle) at Hardenbergufer 59 houses Musical Theater courses.

== History ==
The history of Werden can be traced back to St. Ludger, who founded Werden Abbey at the end of the 8th century. His stone coffin is preserved in the crypt. In 1317, Werden was granted city rights. The Abbey buildings have housed the Folkwang Hochschule since 1927.

St Liudger Church in Werden houses the 7th-century Essen-Werden casket.

The Codex Argenteus ("Silver Bible"), traditionally ascribed to bishop Ulfilas, was discovered in the abbey in the 16th century.

The town was merged into Essen on August 1, 1929. From 1931 to 1933, the Baldeneysee was created, a large reservoir of the Ruhr.

== Traffic ==
The Bundesstraße 224 goes through the centre of Werden, with a high traffic load. Essen-Werden railway station provides access to the S-Bahn trains of the Rhine-Ruhr S-Bahn's S6 line.

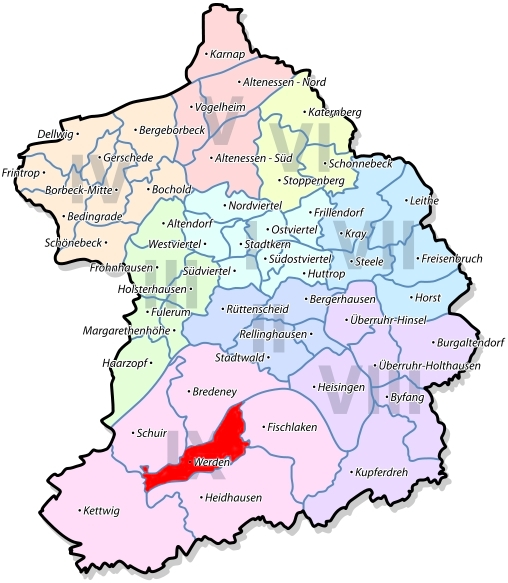
Map of Essen with Werden in red

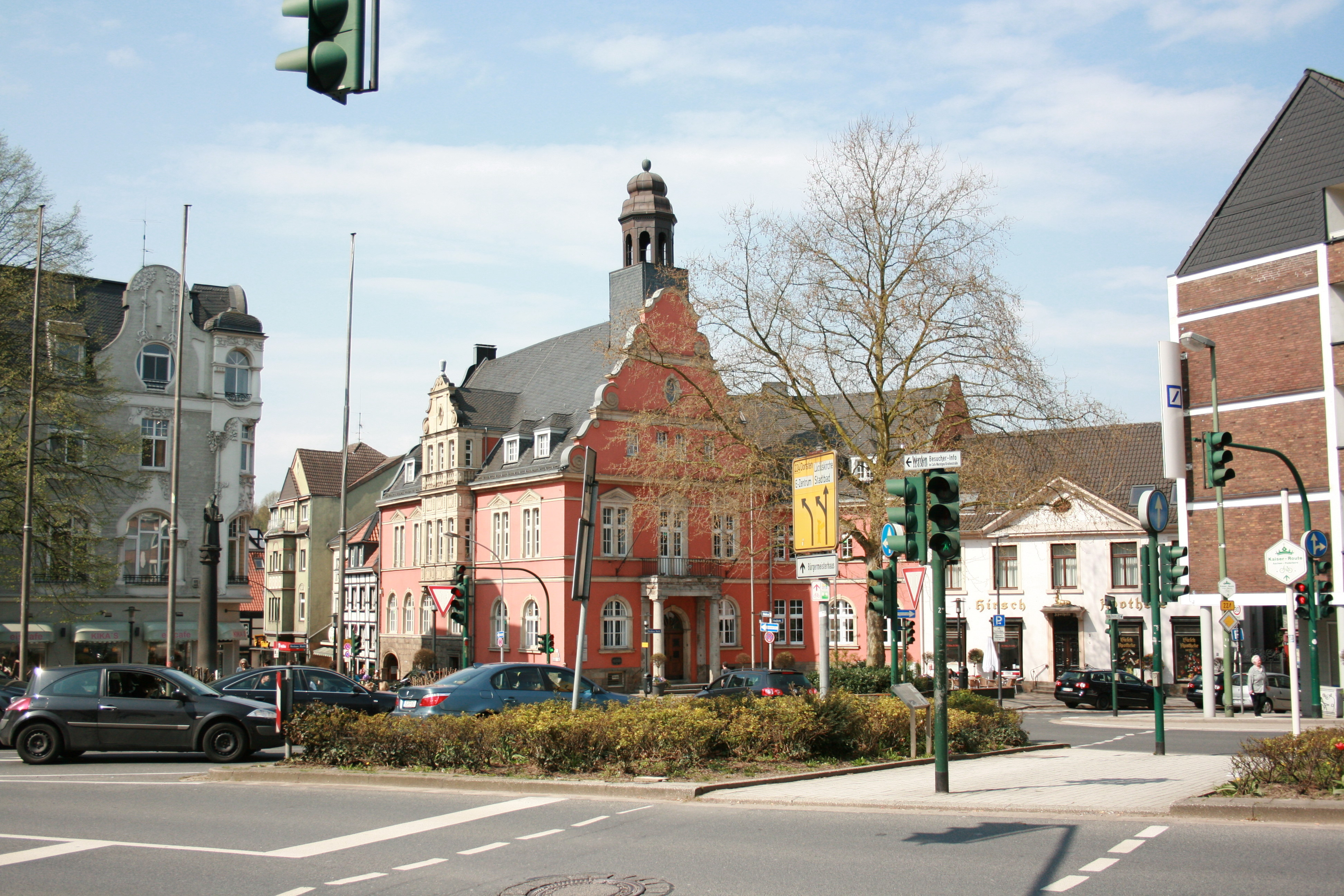
Market place and former City Hall

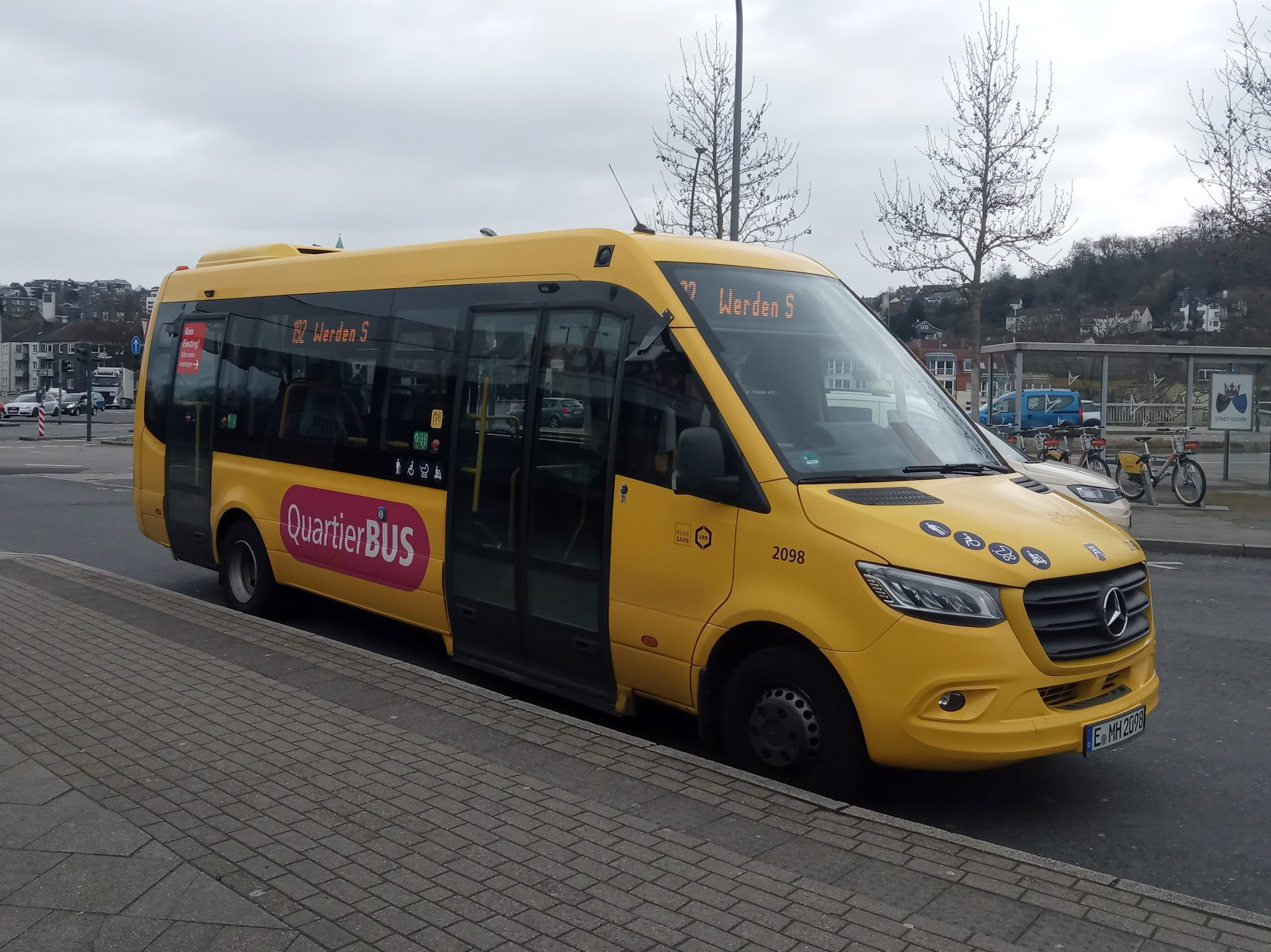
A neighbourhood bus (Quartierbus) at Essen-Werden station
