= Essen-Werden–Essen railway =

Railway line

Coordinates: 51.4224°N 7.0236°E

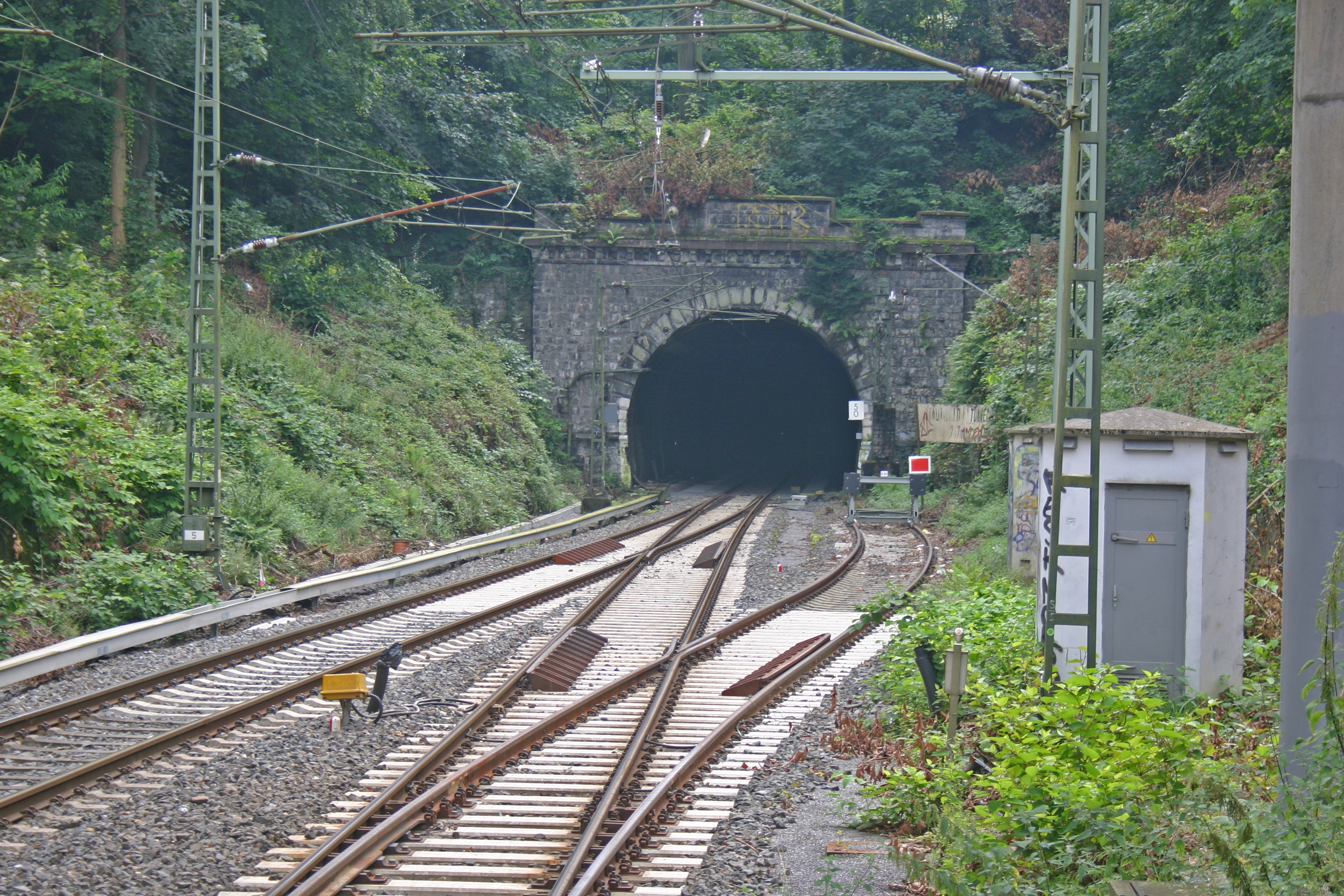
- Northern portal of Stadtwald tunnel in Essen-Stadtwald

Overview
- Line number: 2161
- Locale: North Rhine-Westphalia, Germany

Service
- Route number: 450.6

Technical
- Line length: 8.8 km (5.5 mi)
- Number of tracks: 2 (except Stadtwald Tunnel)
- Track gauge: 1,435 mm (4 ft 8 1/2 in) standard gauge
- Electrification: 15 kV/16.7 Hz AC overhead catenary
- Operating speed: 100 km/h (62.1 mph) (maximum)
Route map
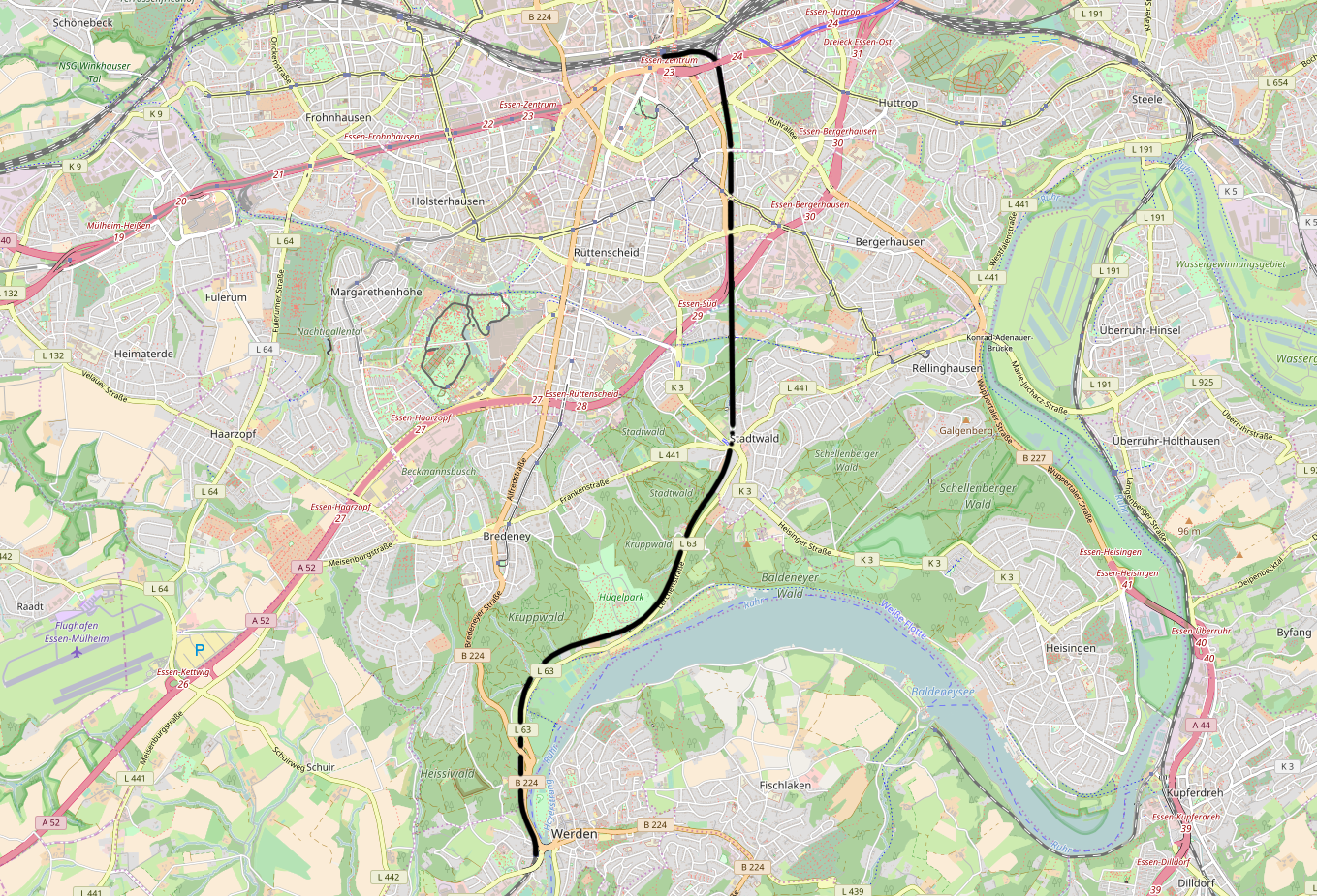
- Source: German railway atlas

The Essen-Werden to Essen railway is an electrified railway line in the German state of North Rhine-Westphalia. It is a main line railway with two tracks, except for the Stadtwald Tunnel, running through the metropolitan area of Essen and connecting Essen-Werden station with Essen Hauptbahnhof.

== History ==
It was opened in 1877 by the Bergisch-Märkische Railway Company (Bergisch-Märkischen Eisenbahn-Gesellschaft) to connect the Ruhr Valley Railway (Ruhrtalbahn) to Essen Hauptbahnhof.

The steep slope between Essen-Werden and Essen Stadtwald has always placed a high demand on the vehicles operating on it. The Essen-Hügel station was built on a steep slope at the instigation of the Krupp family next to the Villa Hügel.

The 1944 timetable listed 51 pairs of train services, including additional peak hour services between Essen Hbf and Essen Stadtwald in the line on weekdays. The line has been served since 26 May 1974 by line S 6 of the Rhine-Ruhr S-Bahn, although a service with S-Bahn characteristics had operated since 26 May 1968.

Deutsche Bahn renovated the line between 7 July and 19 August 2012. The stations of Essen Süd, Essen-Stadtwald, Essen-Hügel and Essen-Werden were modernised and harmonised as part of this work and 96 centimetre-high platforms were installed.

== Line closures ==
Due to the effect of mining subsidence on a retaining wall north of the railway embankment between Essen-Stadtwald and Essen-Hügel, the line has been closed since 18 October 2017 and the trains of the S 6 from Dusseldorf terminate in Kettwig station. After 40 exploratory holes were drilled, Deutsche Bahn indicated old mining had caused the damage. The cavities that have been discovered are currently being filled in. The work and the closure of the line are to last until April 2018. During this period, buses are being operated between Kettwig and Essen Hauptbahnhof as rail replacement services.
