= 2021 Leverkusen explosion =

Industrial disaster in Leverkusen, Germany

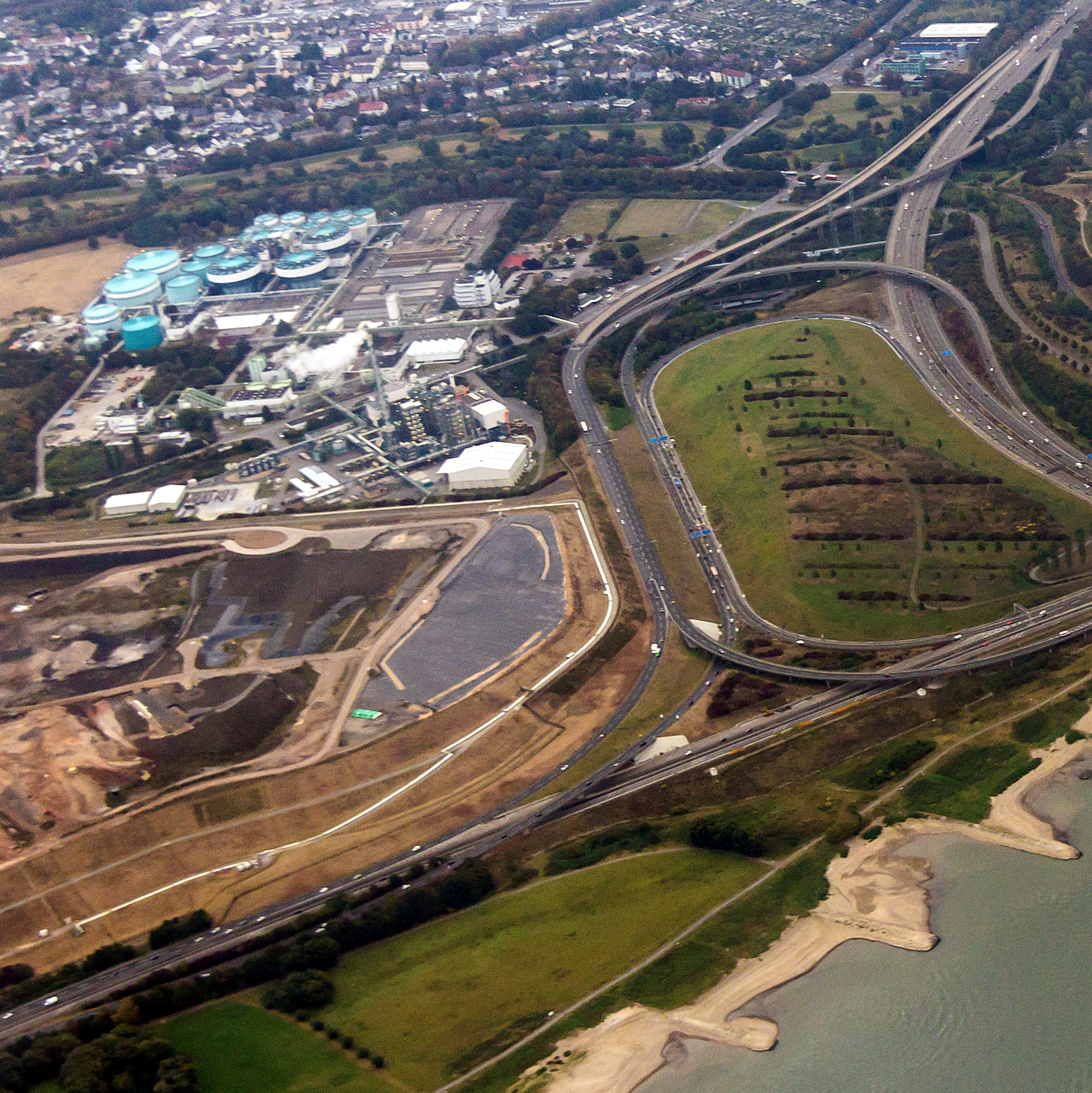
- Date: 27 July 2021
- Time: 09:35 CEST
- Venue: Chempark
- Location: Leverkusen, NRW, Germany; 51.0130°N 6.9914°E
- Type: Explosion and fire
- Deaths: 7
- Injuries: 31
- Missing: 1

An explosion occurred at Chempark, an industrial park for chemical factories in Leverkusen, North Rhine-Westphalia, Germany, on 27 July 2021, at 09:35 local time, sending a pall of smoke over the city.

The city of Leverkusen stated that the explosion, which caused a fire, occurred in storage tanks for solvents. In a first statement, the Cologne fire department said that the air pollution measurements did not show any kind of abnormality, the smoke had gone down and that they would continue to measure the air for toxins. Later, the environment department of North Rhine-Westphalia (LANUV) announced they were expecting toxic doses of dioxins, PCBs, and furans or their derivatives in the fallout from the smoke cloud and told residents in large surrounding areas not to eat or touch fruit from their gardens, even not to clean surfaces and objects from the fallout until further notice.

The explosion killed seven people, thirty-one more people were injured. All the casualties were workers at the site.
