= Düsseldorf rail freight bypass =

Düsseldorf freight bypass railway

Overview
- Native name: Güterumgehungsbahn Düsseldorf
- Line number: 2401 (D-Derendorf–D-Vogelsang); 2410 (D-Lierenfeld–D-Derendorf); 2411 (D-Reisholz–D-Derendorf); 2416 (D Hbf–Präsident Loewel)
- Locale: North Rhine-Westphalia, Germany

Service
- Route number: (freight only)

Technical
- Line length: 12 km (7.5 mi)
- Track gauge: 1,435 mm (4 ft 8 1/2 in) standard gauge
- Operating speed: 80 km/h (50 mph)

The Düsseldorf freight bypass railway (Güterumgehungsbahn Düsseldorf) is a now-partly-disused railway line in the German state of North Rhine-Westphalia. It connects the Düsseldorf-Reisholz freight yard and the Düsseldorf-Derendorf freight yard (near Düsseldorf-Derendorf station), both located on the Cologne–Duisburg railway, via the former Düsseldorf-Lierenfeld freight yard.

The freight bypass allows freight trains to avoid the busy Düsseldorf Hauptbahnhof using a separate and direct line.

== History ==
The Cologne-Minden Railway Company had already established a freight line between the then Lierenfeld junction and Wehrhahn in 1863, but this was closed in 1880. In 1932 the old line was returned to service and connected by a grade-separated junction with the Cologne–Duisburg railway.

== Current situation ==
The closing of the former Düsseldorf-Derendorf marshalling yard means that the bypass railway has lost most of its purpose. Of the three tracks passing under the main line, only the northernmost track at Rethel junction remains in operation. Concrete pillars have been erected for supporting overhead wire on the western ramp of the southernmost passage under the main line, which gave direct access to Lierenfeld.
