= Leverkusen-Rheindorf station =

Railway station in Leverkusen, Germany

Leverkusen Rheindorf
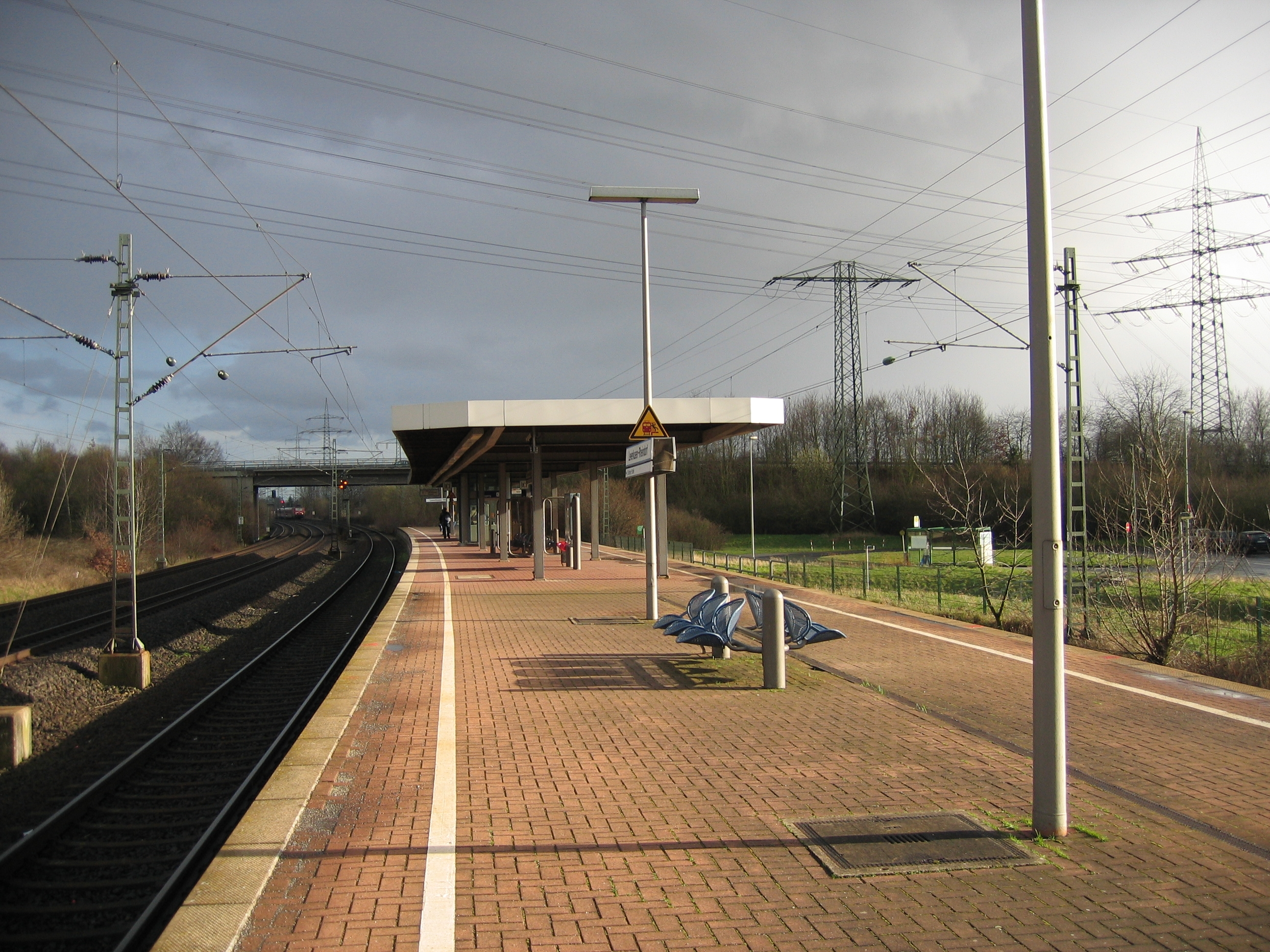

General information
- Location: Leverkusen, NRW; Germany
- Coordinates: 51°03′51″N 6°57′48″E
- Lines: Cologne–Duisburg (KBS 450.6)
- Platforms: 2

Construction
- Accessible: Yes

Other information
- Station code: 3693
- DS100 code: KLRH
- IBNR: 8003672
- Category: 5
- Fare zone: VRS: 2200
- Website: www.bahnhof.de

History
- Opened: 2 June 1991

Services
Preceding station	Rhine-Ruhr S-Bahn	Following station
Leverkusen-Küppersteg towards Köln-Nippes	S6	Langenfeld towards Essen Hbf
Location

Leverkusen-Rheindorf station is located in the district of Rheindorf in the city of Leverkusen in the German state of North Rhine-Westphalia. It is on the Cologne–Duisburg line and is classified by Deutsche Bahn as a category 5 station. It is served by Rhine-Ruhr S-Bahn line S 6 every 20 minutes.

== Services ==
Currently, the station is served by S-Bahn line S6 and three regular bus routes: 207, 211 and 215 (operated by Wupsi GmbH).
