= Leverkusen-Küppersteg station =

Railway station in Leverkusen, Germany

Leverkusen Küppersteg
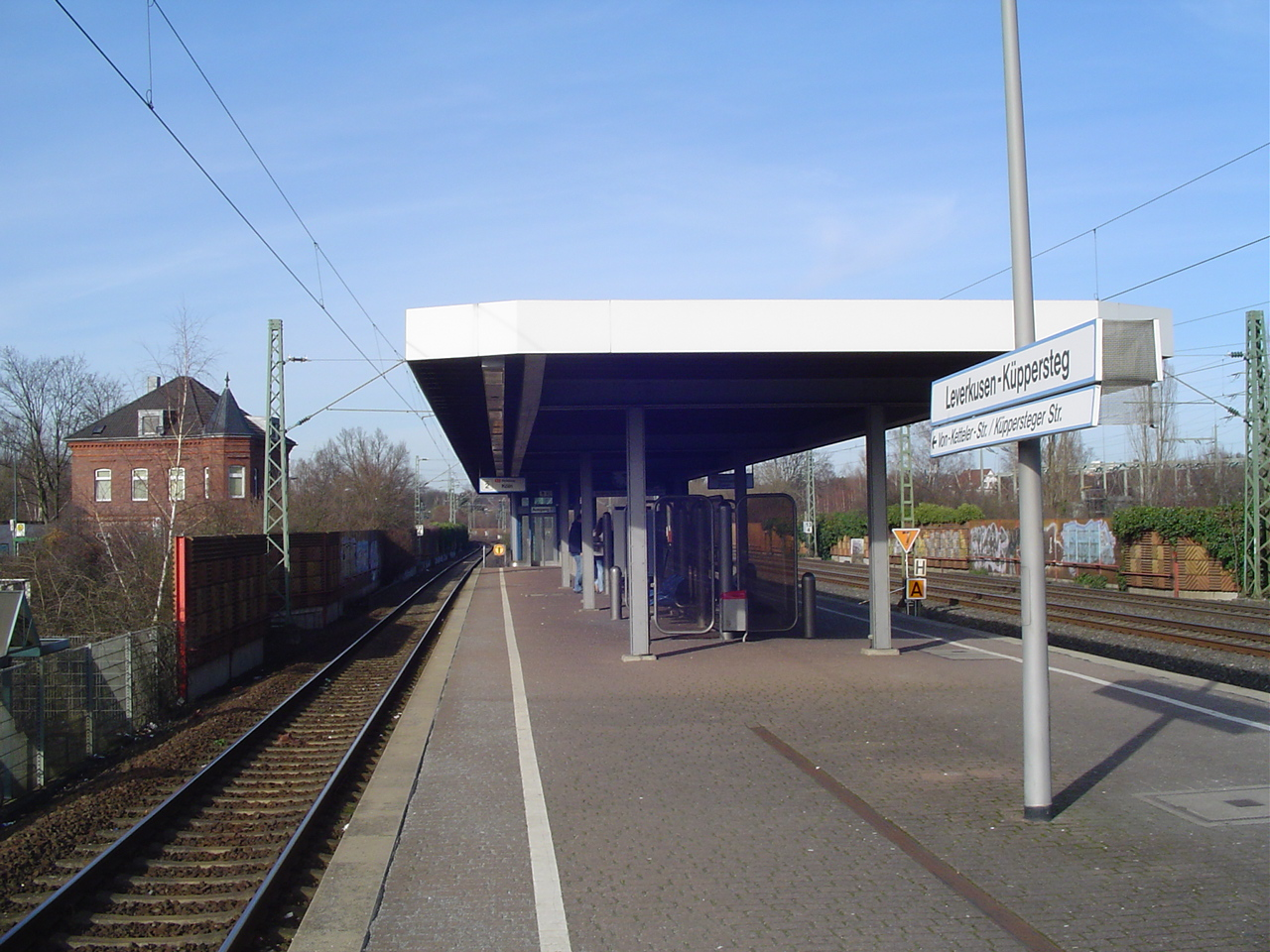
- Leverkusen-Küppersteg station in 2007

General information
- Location: Küppersteger Str. 57; Leverkusen, NRW; Germany
- Coordinates: 51°02′45″N 6°59′17″E
- Line: Cologne–Duisburg railway
- Platforms: 1
- Tracks: 2

Construction
- Accessible: Yes

Other information
- Station code: 3692
- DS100 code: KLK
- Category: 5
- Fare zone: VRS: 2200
- Website: www.bahnhof.de

History
- Opened: 20 December 1845

Services
Preceding station	Rhine-Ruhr S-Bahn	Following station
Leverkusen Mitte towards Köln-Nippes	S6	Leverkusen-Rheindorf towards Essen Hbf
Location

Leverkusen-Küppersteg is a railway station on the Cologne–Duisburg railway, situated in Leverkusen in western Germany. It is classified by Deutsche Bahn as a category 5 station. It is served by the S6 line of the Rhine-Ruhr S-Bahn at 20-minute intervals.
