= BayArena =

Football stadium

Coordinates: 51°2′18″N 7°0′8″E

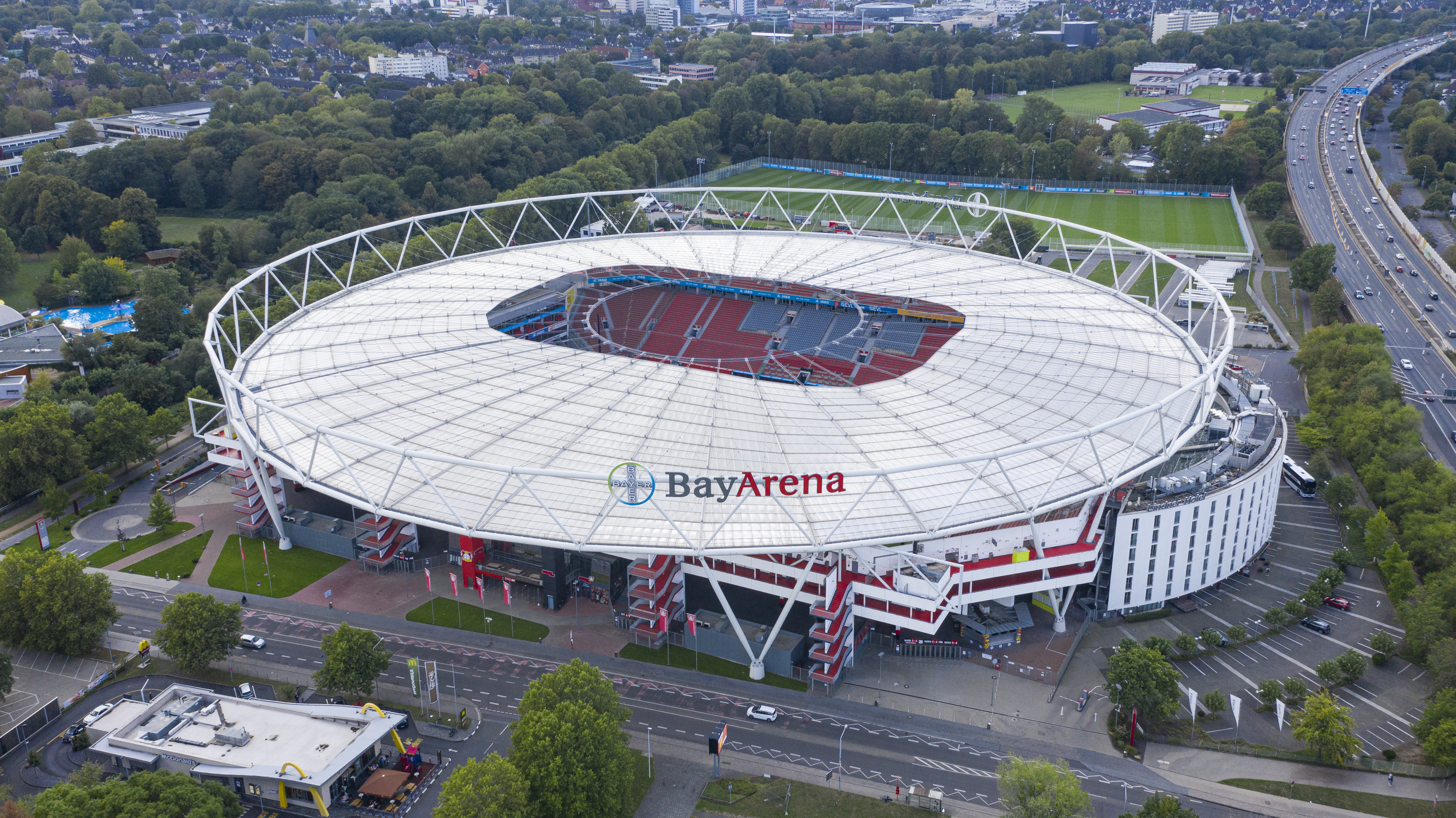
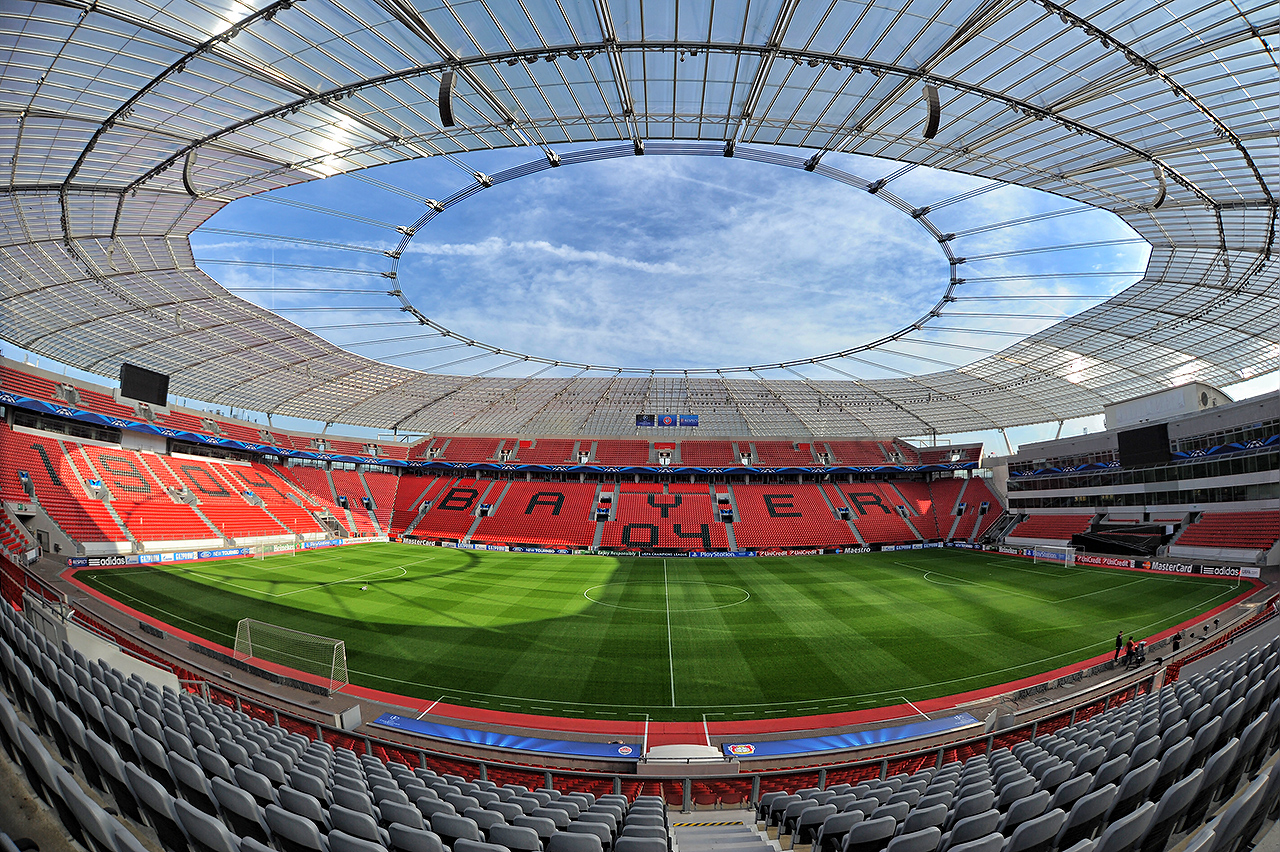
- Interactive map of BayArena
- Former names: Ulrich-Haberland-Stadion (1958–1998)
- Location: Leverkusen, North Rhine-Westphalia, Germany
- Owner: Bayer
- Operator: Bayer 04 Leverkusen
- Capacity: 30,210 (league matches); 29,412 (international matches)
- Surface: Grass
- Public transit: Leverkusen Mitte

Construction
- Opened: 2 August 1958
- Renovated: 1997, 2009
- Cost: €70 million (renovated 2009)
- Architect: Max Bogl

Tenants
- Bayer 04 Leverkusen (1958–present); Germany national football team (selected matches)

Website
- https://www.bayer04.de/en-us/page/bayarena

BayArena (German pronunciation: [ˈbaɪʔaˌʁeːnaː]) is a football stadium in Leverkusen, North Rhine-Westphalia, Germany, which has been the home ground of Bundesliga club Bayer 04 Leverkusen since 1958.

== History ==
The stadium was originally known as Ulrich-Haberland-Stadion (pronounced [ˌʔʊlʁɪçˈhaːbɐlantˌʃtaːdi̯ɔn]; English: Ulrich Haberland Stadium), named after a former chairman of Bayer AG, the club's founders. Its original capacity was 20,000.

In 1986, a rebuilding project began to convert it into a modern facility; the project continued over the following decade and was completed in 1997, creating a modern all-seater stadium with a capacity of 22,500. The stadium was renamed BayArena in 1998. The former name was then used for the youth team stadium next to it.

In 1999, a hotel attached to the stadium was completed, with some rooms having a view of the pitch. The stadium complex also includes a restaurant, which also overlooks the pitch, and conference facilities.

The city of Leverkusen originally bid to become a venue for the 2006 World Cup, with an expanded Bay Arena as the site. However, the city, Bayer Leverkusen, and the German organizing committee soon agreed that expanding Bay Arena to the FIFA-mandated minimum 40,000 capacity for World Cup matches would not be practical, and the city withdrew its bid. Instead, it was agreed that Bay Arena would be the main training facility for the German national team during the 2006 finals. Jürgen Klinsmann, former national coach, however decided against Leverkusen and opted for Berlin as the main training facility. As compensation, BayArena would supposedly host two national matches, though they were never played.

== 2011 FIFA Women's World Cup ==
On 30 March 2007 Bayer AG agreed on the extension of the stadium to a capacity of over 30,000. Construction works began end of 2007 and were expected to be finished at the beginning of the 2009–10 season. On 30 September 2008, Bay Arena was selected as one of nine venues to be used during the 2011 FIFA Women's World Cup to house three group and one quarterfinal match.

=== 2011 FIFA Women's World Cup matches ===
Date	Time (CET)	Team #1	Result	Team #2	Round	Spectators
28 June 2011	15:00	Colombia	0–1	Sweden	Group C	21,106
1 July 2011	15:00	Japan	4–0	Mexico	Group B	22,291
6 July 2011	18:00	Australia	2–2	Norway	Group D	18,474
9 July 2011	18:00	England	1–1 (3–4 pen.)	France	Quarter-finals	26,395

== Design ==
As the new stadium design was planned in the 80s, it was based on the design of the then Ruhrstadium in Bochum. A steep single-tier football stadium without a running track with seating for 35,000 spectators. The stadium was intended to be constructed section by section over time in order to save costs and grow with the demands of the club, starting with the east stand in 1986, the west in 1989 and the north in 1991. In the middle of the rebuild, the demands of modern football stadiums changed. Suites and VIP Areas became necessary, a family friendly section as well as design modification to all-seater following the Bundesliga riots of the 1990s and the demands for international matches.

As a lesson from the World Cup 1994 in the USA the north section was redesignated as a so-called "Family Street", the first section of a German stadium aimed at attracting a younger audience. This concept proved to be a rousing success and demanded the moving of the Family Street to the larger east section for the 1996–97 season. In the process the BayArena was the first stadium in Germany to turn into an all-seater and to remove part of the fences which had separated the tiers from the pitch, starting again in the east and later expanded to the whole stadium. Due to the demands for larger VIP areas, the original plans for closing the gap in the south with a stand the same layout as the north were dropped in 1995. Instead the south section was built as box suites, making the stadium unique in the Bundesliga with its South American style horseshoe design. With the work finished in 1997 the BayArena was judged as the most comfortable and modern stadium in Germany.

The expansion and renovation of 2007–2009 added a second tier over the east, north and west sections, new VIP suites between the two tiers, a new oval roof covering all seats as well as the complete rebuild of the club's main facilities in the west section. It also saw the reintroduction of pure standing areas for the home supporters in the corner north/east. After summer 2013, the pure standing area was stretched over the complete first rows of the north section of the stadium.

== Gallery ==
BayArena layout

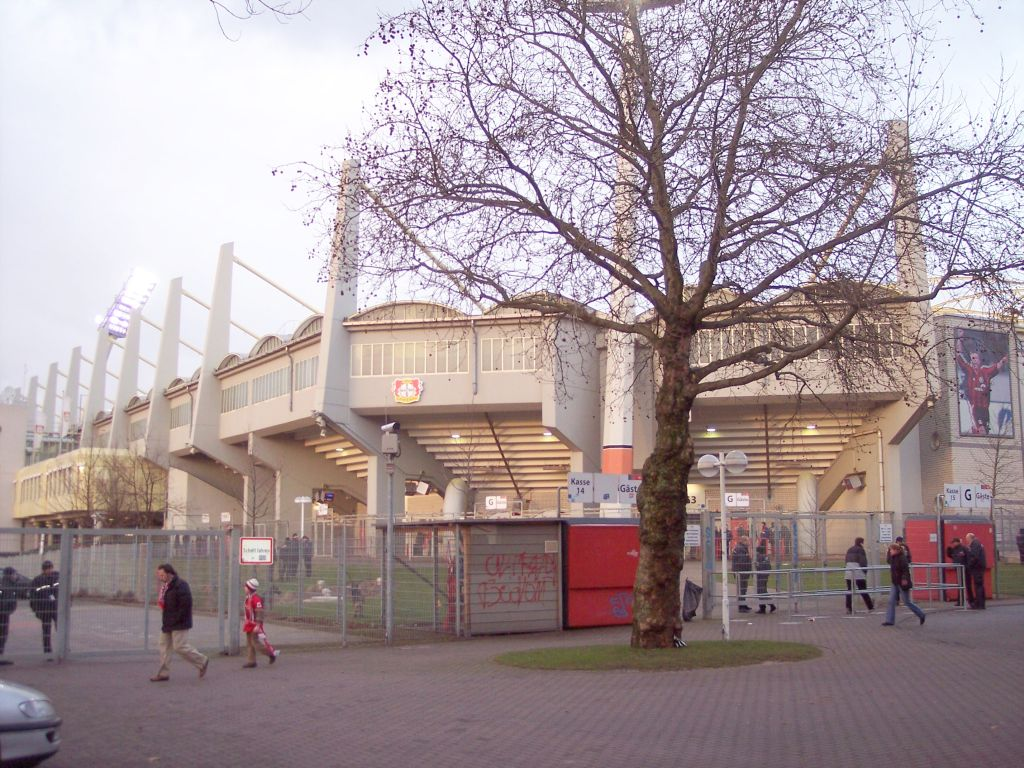
BayArena in 2005

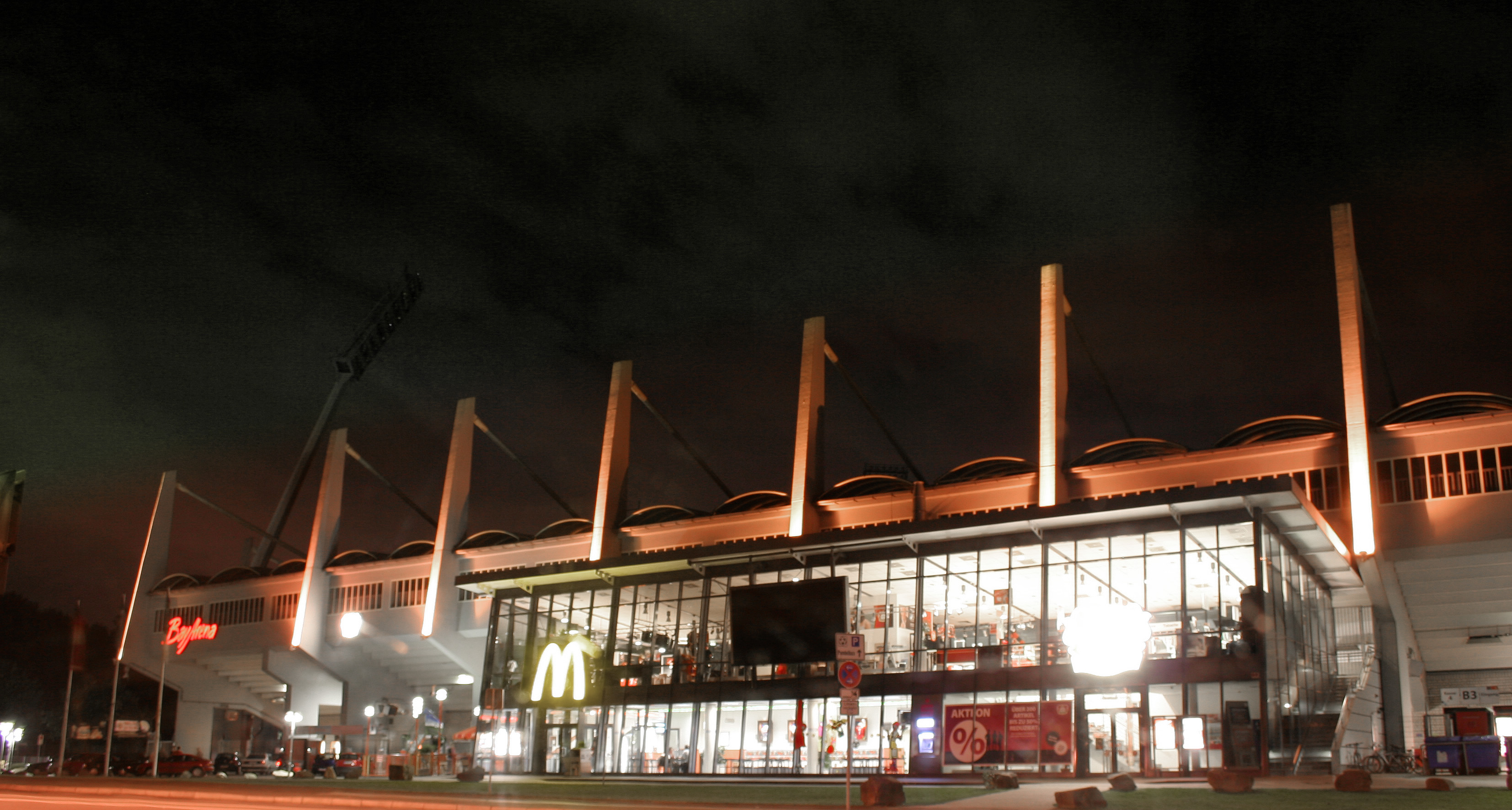
BayArena in 2007

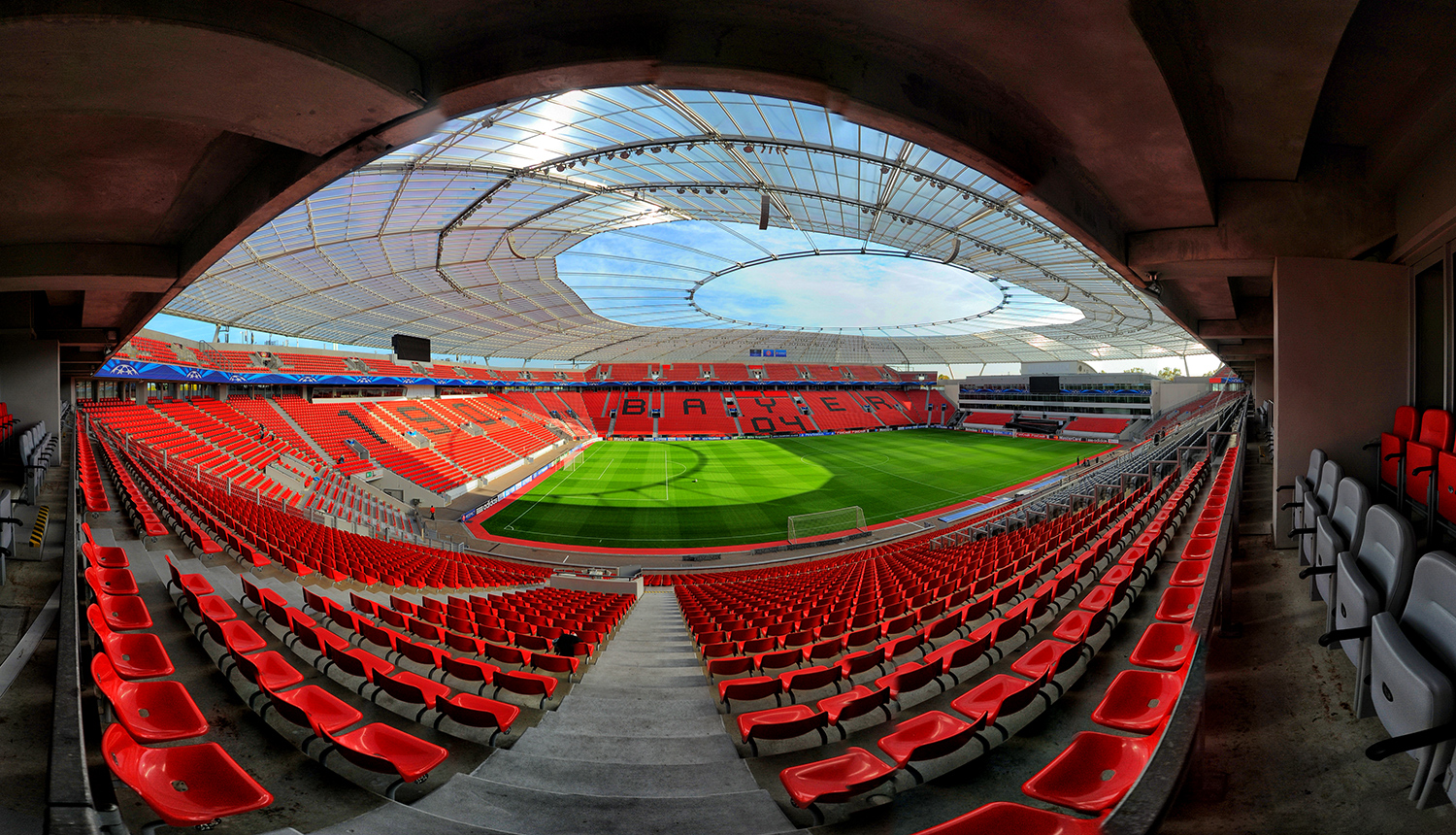
Interior of the BayArena

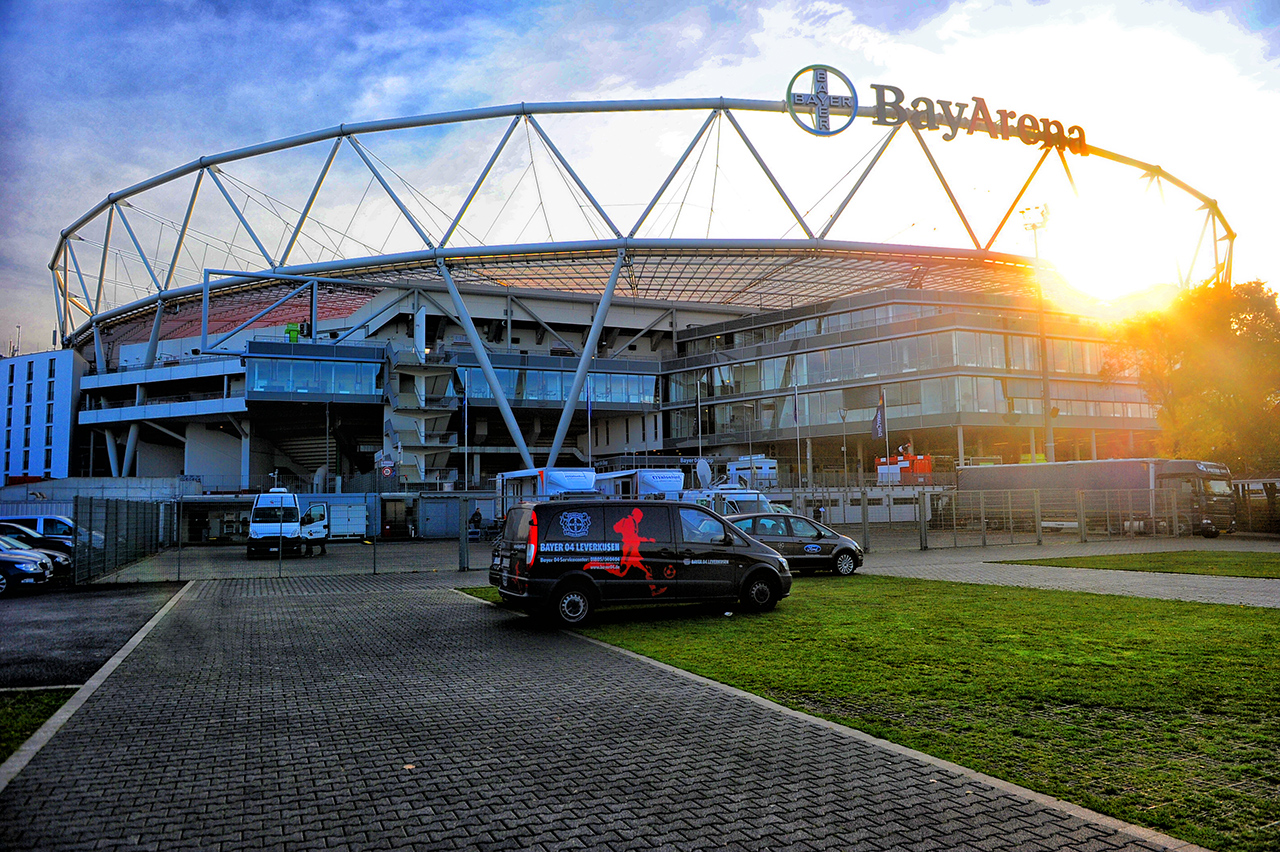
Office of Bayer 04

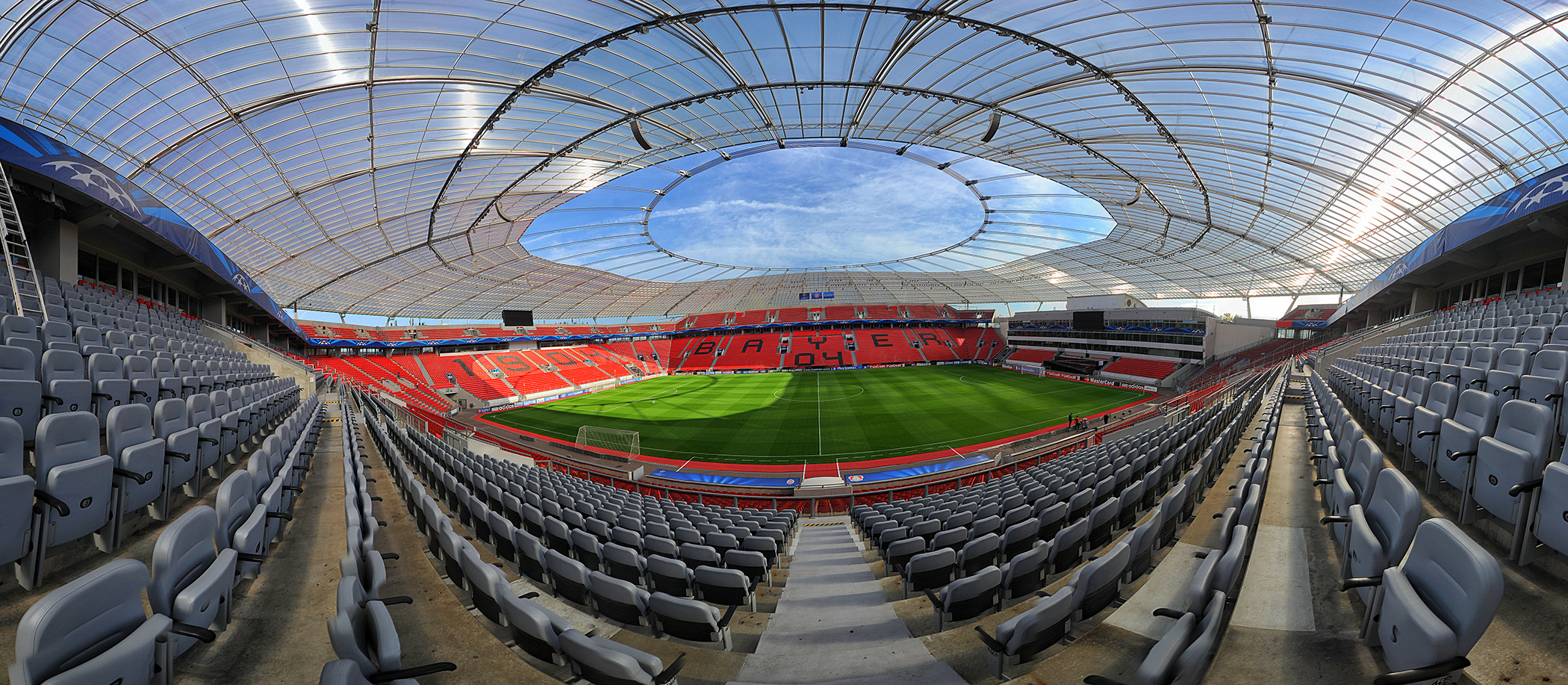
Office of Bayer 04

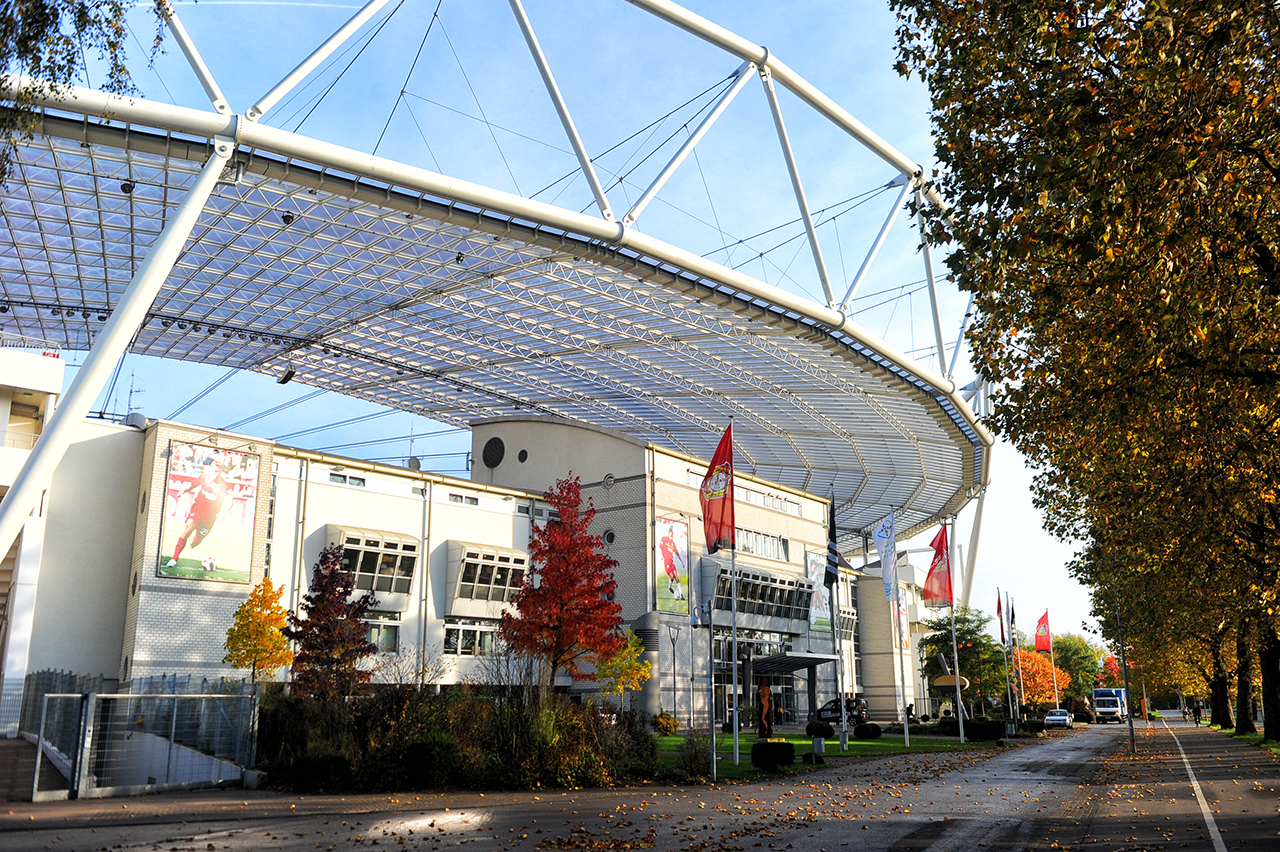
Office of Bayer 04

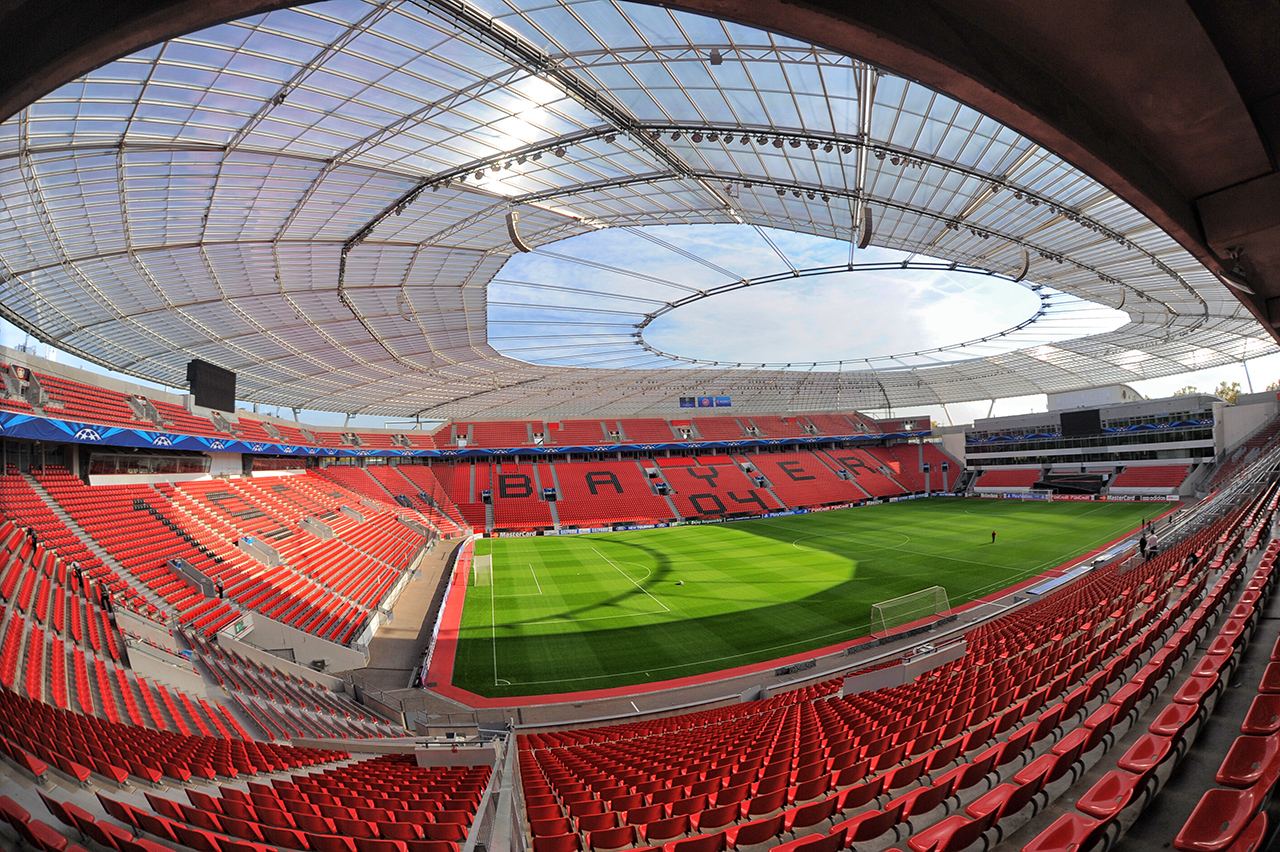
Office of Bayer 04

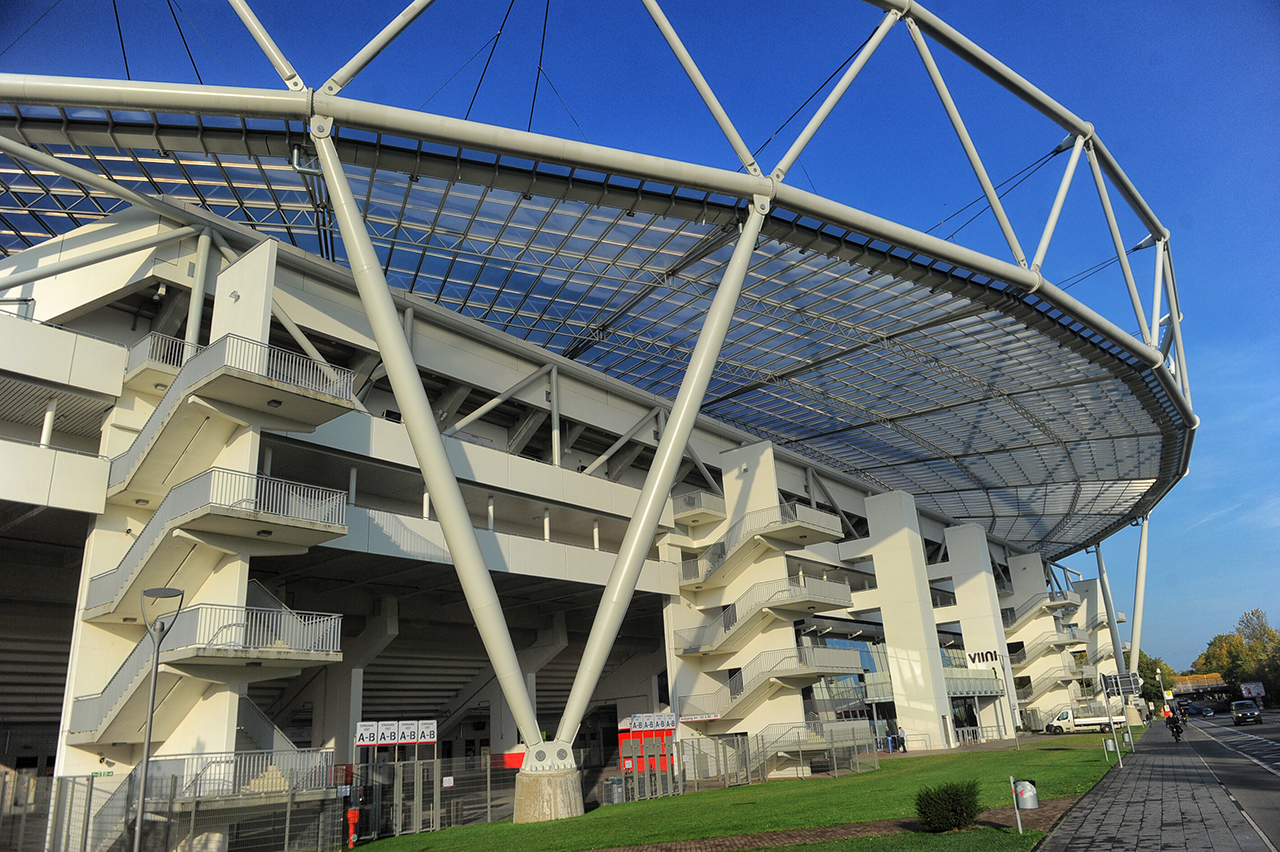
Office of Bayer 04

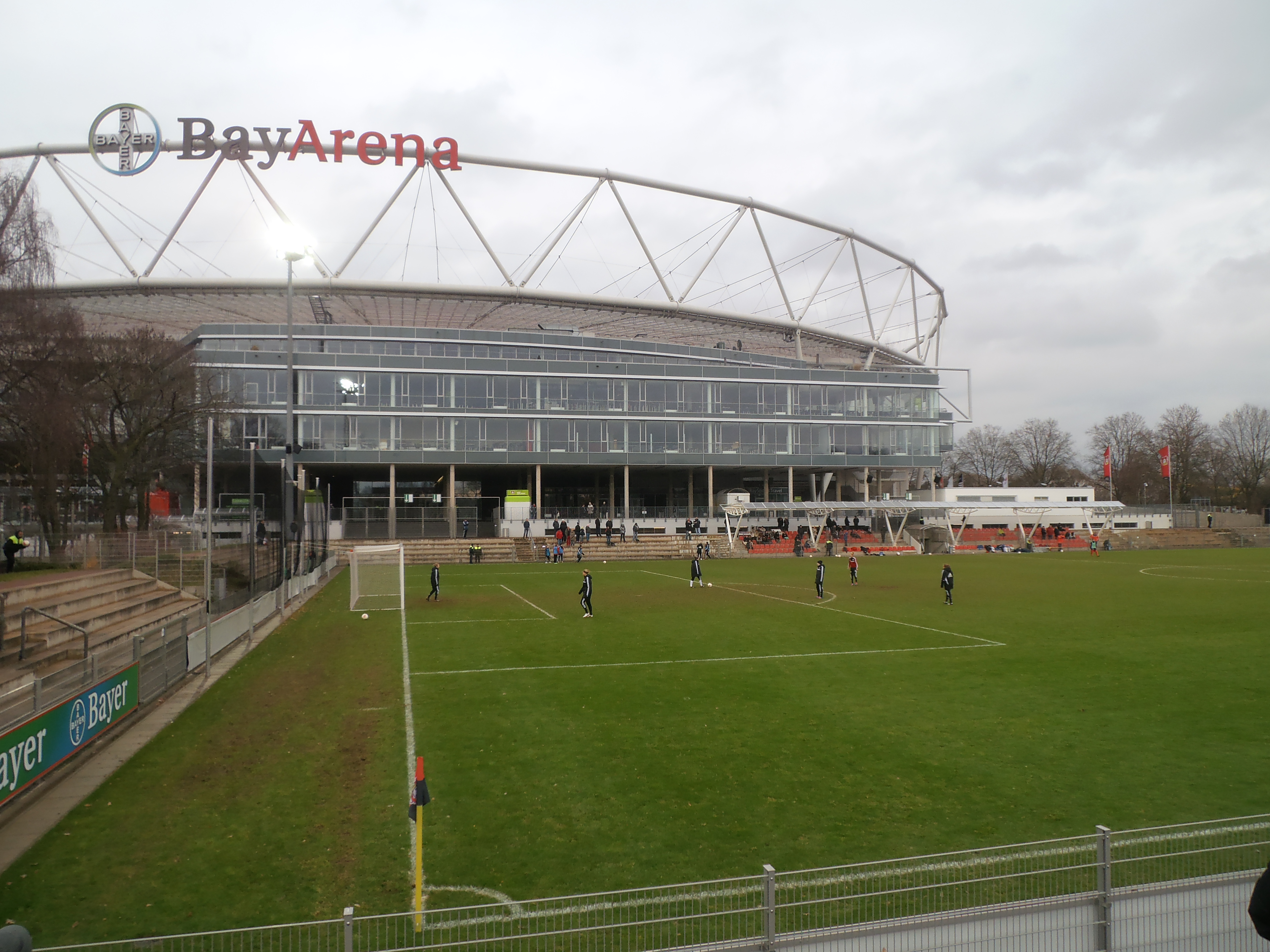
BayArena next to the currently-named Ulrich-Haberland-Stadion used for youth teams
