= Düsseldorf-Benrath station =

Railway station in Düsseldorf, Germany

Düsseldorf Benrath
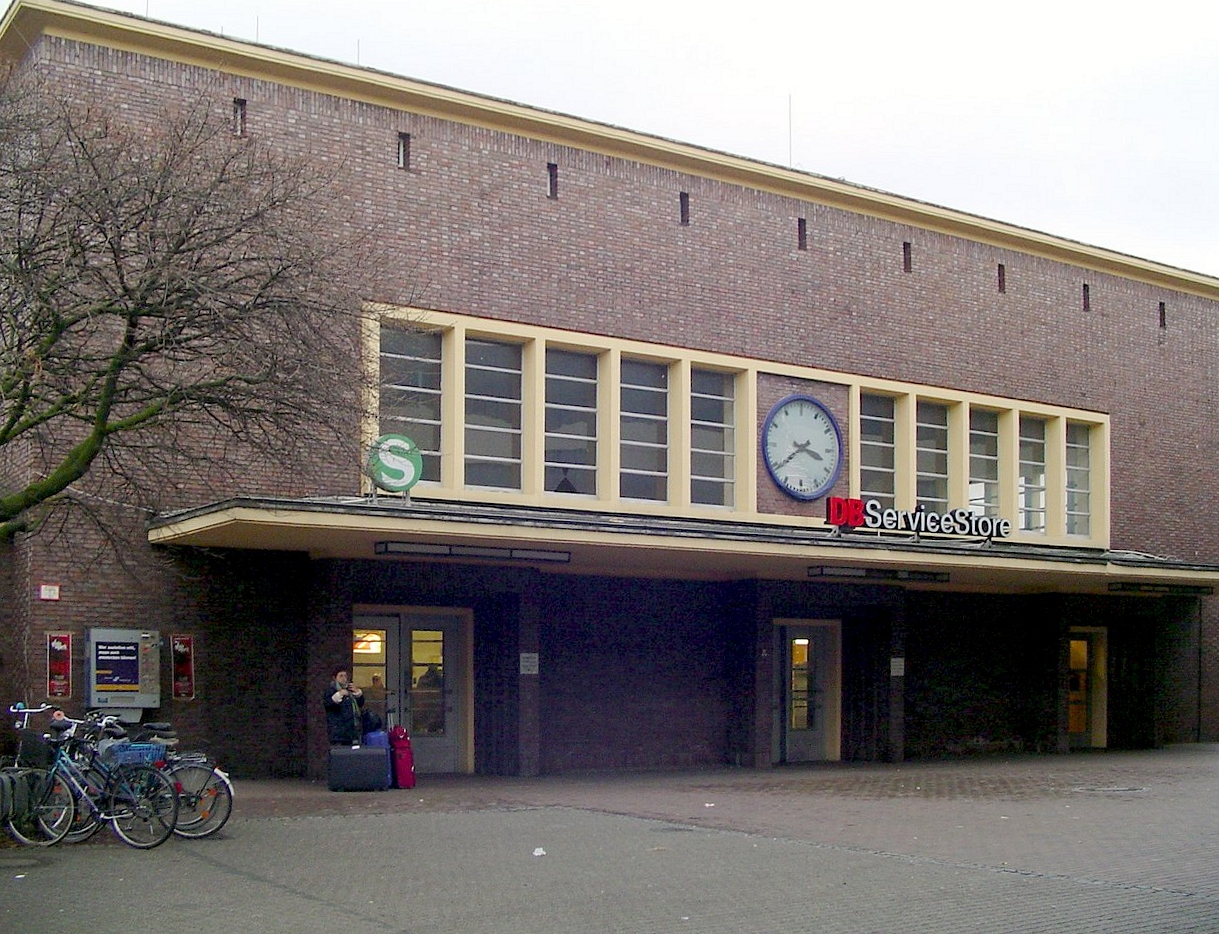

General information
- Location: Heubesstr. 23; Düsseldorf-Benrath, NRW; Germany
- Coordinates: 51°9′44.1″N 6°52′42.2″E
- Lines: Cologne–Duisburg (KBS 415)
- Platforms: 4

Construction
- Accessible: Yes

Other information
- Station code: 1399
- DS100 code: KDBE
- IBNR: 8001584
- Category: 4
- Fare zone: VRR: 530; VRS: 1530 (VRR transitional zone)
- Website: www.bahnhof.de

History
- Opened: 15 December 1845

Passengers
- 25,000 - 30,000

Services
Preceding station	National Express Germany	Following station
Leverkusen Mitte towards Aachen Hbf	RE 1 (NRW-Express)	Düsseldorf Hbf towards Hamm (Westf) Hbf
Leverkusen Mitte towards Koblenz Hbf	RE 5 (Rhein-Express)	Düsseldorf Hbf towards Wesel
Preceding station	Rhine-Ruhr S-Bahn	Following station
Düsseldorf-Garath towards Köln-Nippes	S6	Düsseldorf-Reisholz towards Essen Hbf
Düsseldorf-Garath towards Langenfeld	S68	Düsseldorf-Reisholz towards Wuppertal-Vohwinkel
Preceding station	Rhine-Ruhr Stadtbahn	Following station
Urdenbacher Allee towards Düsseldorf-Rath	U71	Benrath Betriebshof Terminus
Urdenbacher Allee towards Gerresheim Krankenhaus	U83	Benrath Betriebshof Terminus
Location

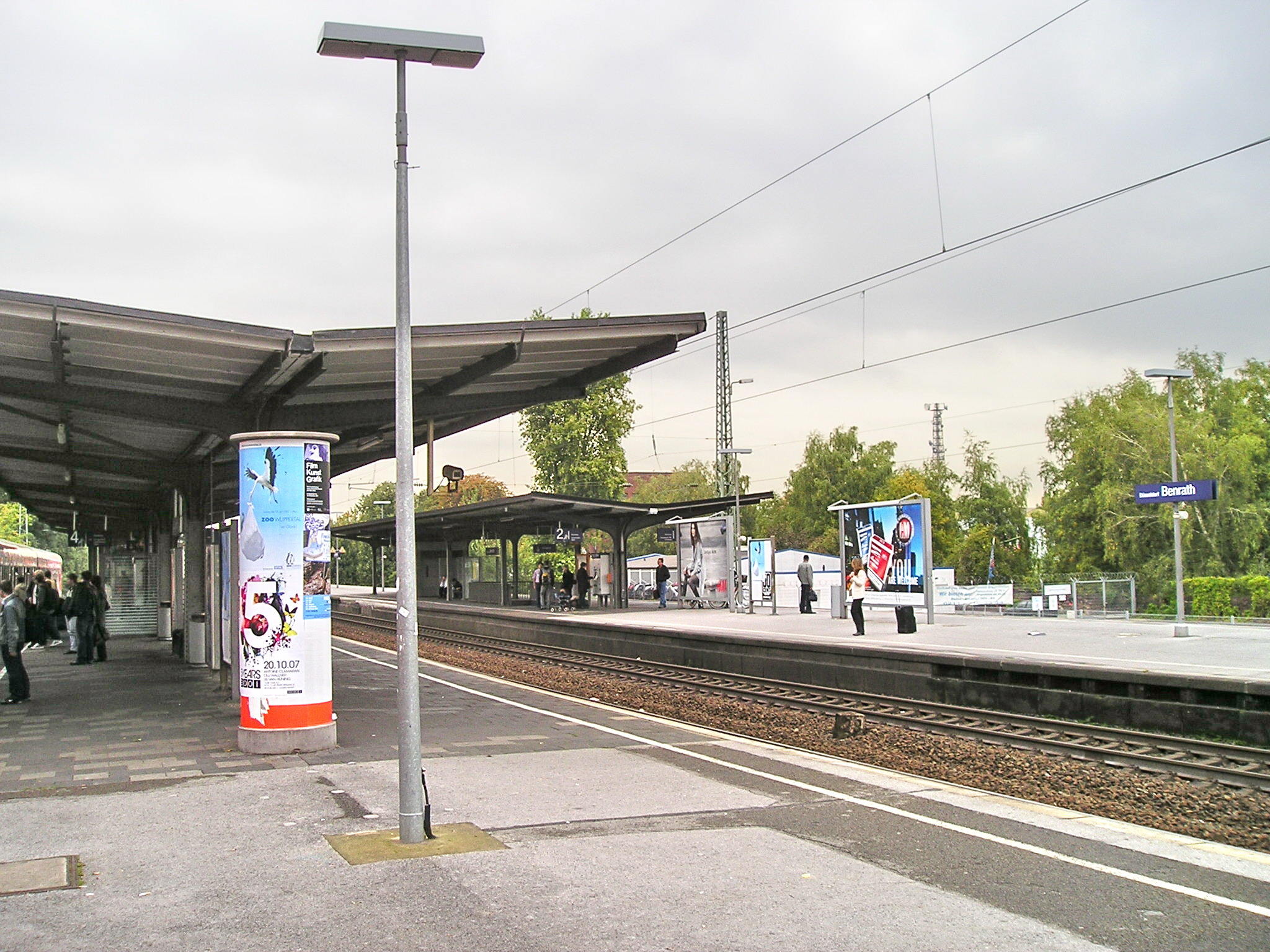
Platforms

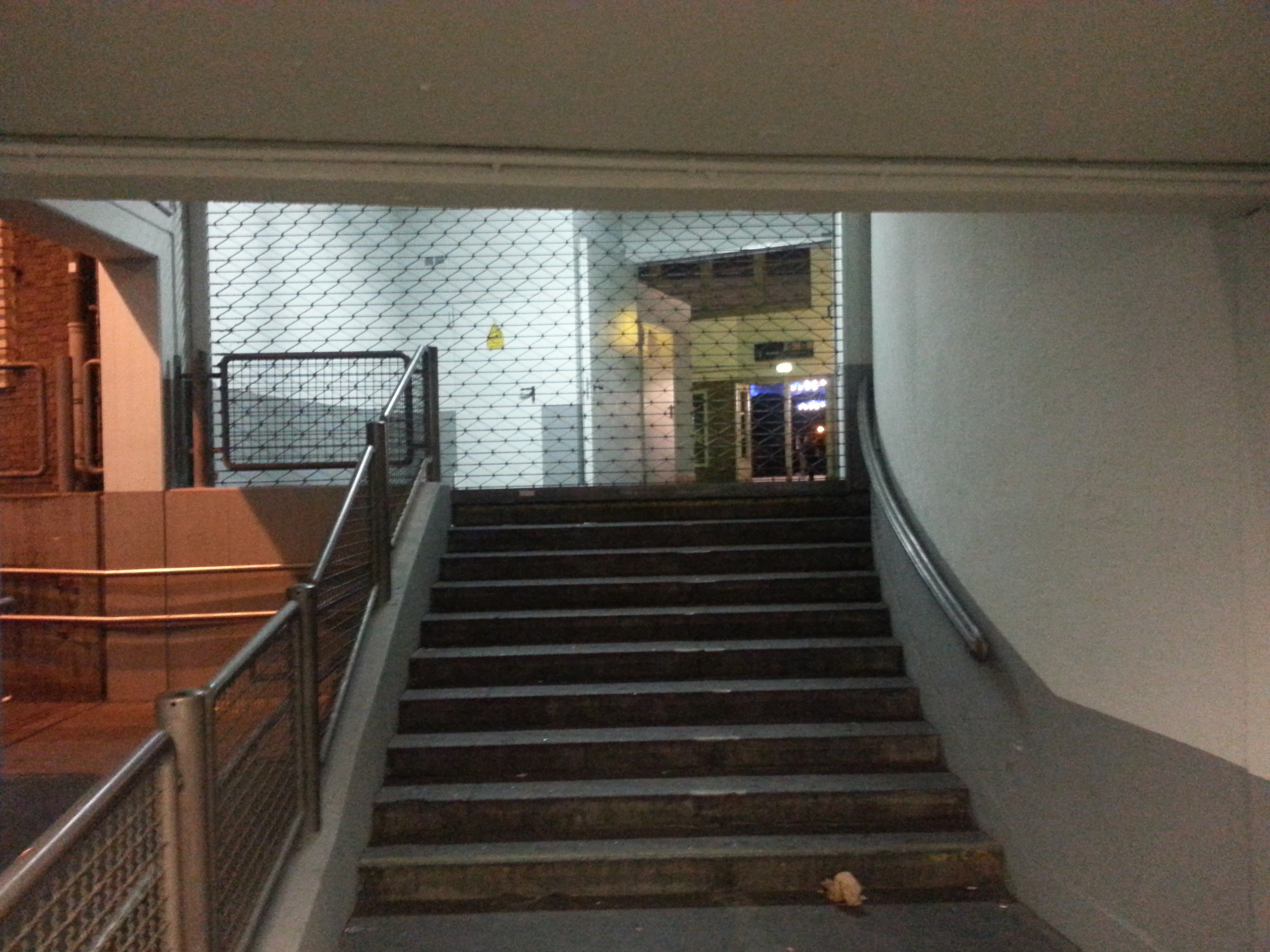
Main entrance at night

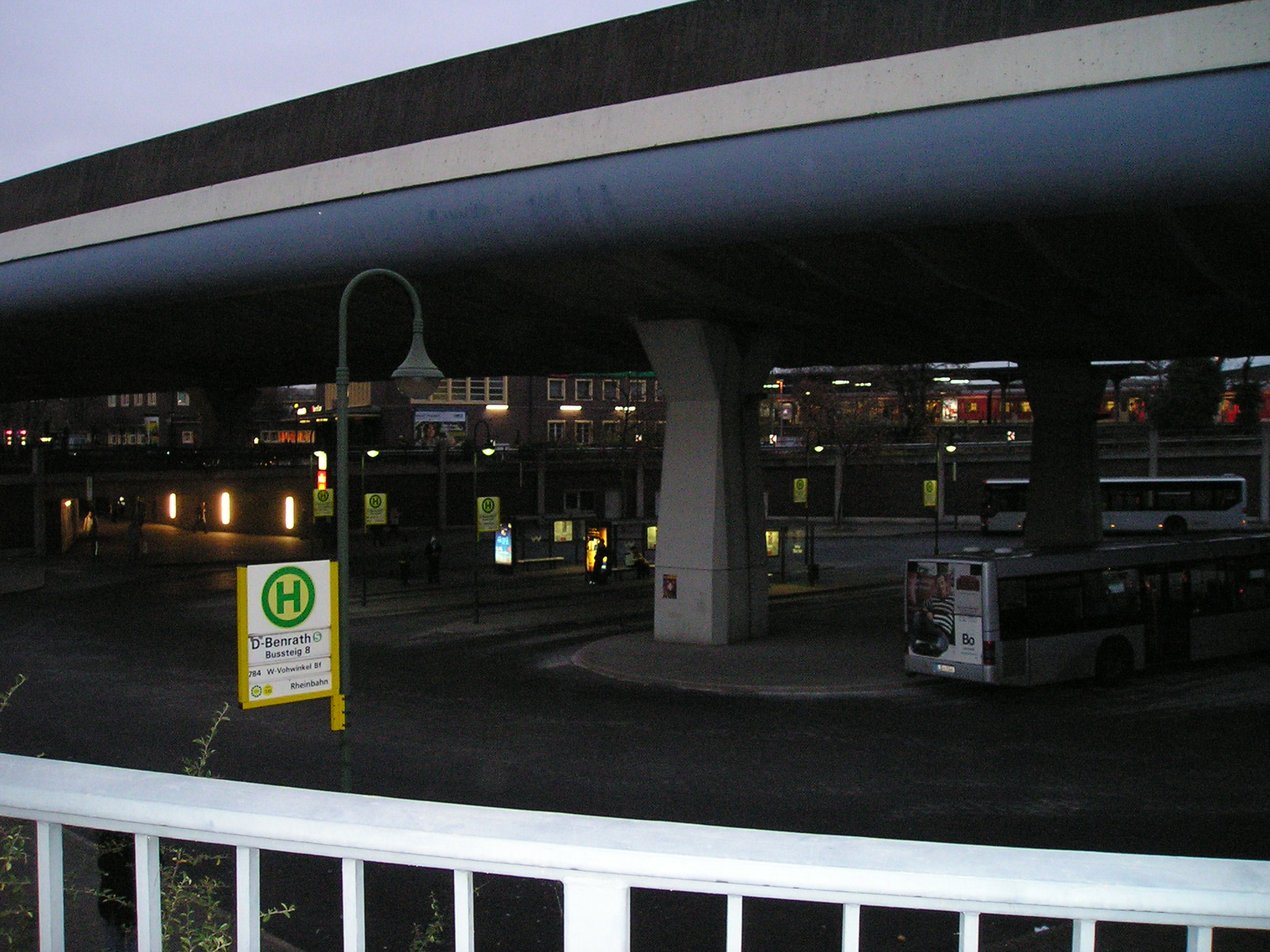
Benrath bus station

Düsseldorf-Benrath station is about 10 kilometres south of Düsseldorf Hauptbahnhof in the Düsseldorf district of Benrath. It is on the Cologne–Duisburg line, and is classified by Deutsche Bahn as a category 3 station. In addition, Düsseldorf Benrath station is served by two Regional-Express services, several city bus services and two Stadtbahn lines. Benrath is the second busiest station in Düsseldorf, after Düsseldorf Hauptbahnhof, with about 25,000–30,000 daily entries and exits.

On 23 January 1998, the station was heritage-listed by the city of Düsseldorf in the category of technical monuments.

== History ==
In 1843, the Prussian Ministry of Finance gave the Cologne-Minden Railway Company permission to build a railway line from Cologne via Düsseldorf to Minden. Shares were put on sale to finance this project and many people from Benrath bought these shares on the understanding that Benrath would have a station on the new line. On 20 December 1845, the first section opened between Deutz and Duisburg and Benrath station was officially opened.

In 1907, Benrath already handled over 250,000 passengers. The current station building dates from 1932 and replaced the original station. This old station was demolished, because it had become too small for the number of passengers using it and because raising the entire four-track railway line by 2.5 metres allowed a bridge to be over the street.

On 25 May 1965 Queen Elizabeth II visited Benrath and was received by the then Minister-President of North Rhine-Westphalia Franz Meyers at the station, which had been decorated for the occasion.

== Current situation ==
The station is located in a central location between the districts of Düsseldorf-Benrath, Düsseldorf-Urdenbach and Düsseldorf-Garath. It is elevated above Hildener Straße, from which there is access via a tunnel. In addition, both tracks are equipped with lifts. There is parking on both the western and the eastern sides of the station.

The station has two central platforms between the four tracks of the Cologne–Duisburg line. Two Regional-Express services stop at the long-distance platform, while Intercity and Intercity-Express trains pass the platform at 200 km/h without stopping.

== Train services ==
Regional-Express lines RE 1 and RE 5 stop at the station every hour, and S-Bahn line S6 stops at 20-minute intervals. It is also served by Stadtbahn lines U71 and U83, six bus lines and three night express bus lines.

The station is served by the following services:

- Regional services RE 1 NRW-Express Aachen - Cologne - Düsseldorf - Duisburg - Essen - Dortmund - Hamm - Paderborn
- Regional services RE 5 Rhein-Express Emmerich - Wesel - Oberhausen - Duisburg - Düsseldorf - Cologne - Bonn - Koblenz
- Rhein-Ruhr S-Bahn services S6 Essen - Kettwig - Düsseldorf - Cologne - Köln-Nippes
- Rhein-Ruhr S-Bahn services S68 Langenfeld - Düsseldorf - Wuppertal-Vohwinkel
