= Leverkusen-Bürrig water tower =

Water tower in Leverkusen, Germany

Coordinates: 51°02′19″N 6°58′59″E

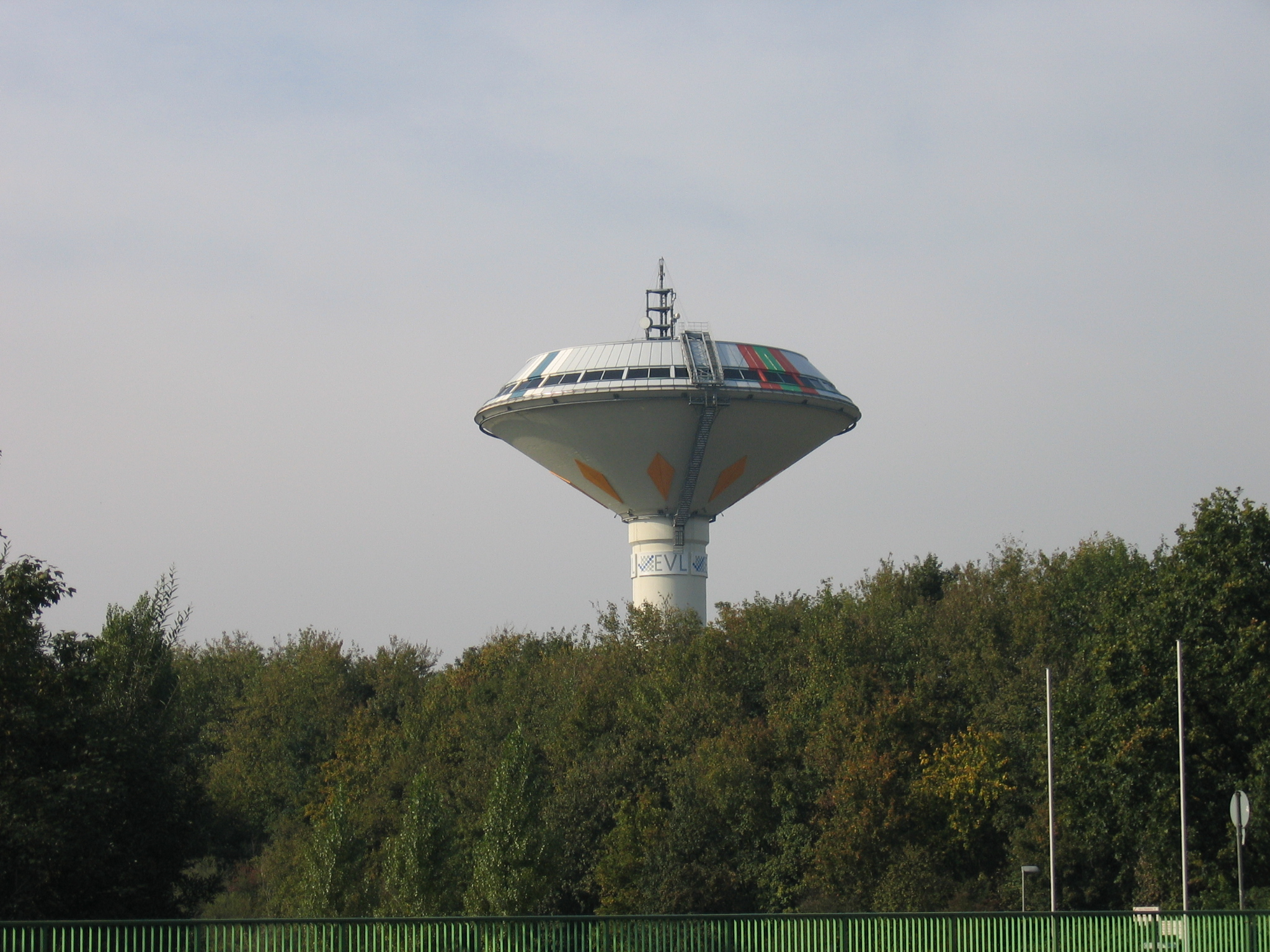
Leverkusen-Bürrig water tower.

Water Tower Leverkusen-Bürrig is a 72-metre-high (236 ft) water tower built in 1978 in Leverkusen-Bürrig. It has a water reservoir of two chambers each of 4000 cubic metres, with a diameter of 42 metres. It has an observation deck for visitors.
