= Düsseldorf-Eller Süd station =

Railway station in Düsseldorf, Germany

Düsseldorf Eller Süd
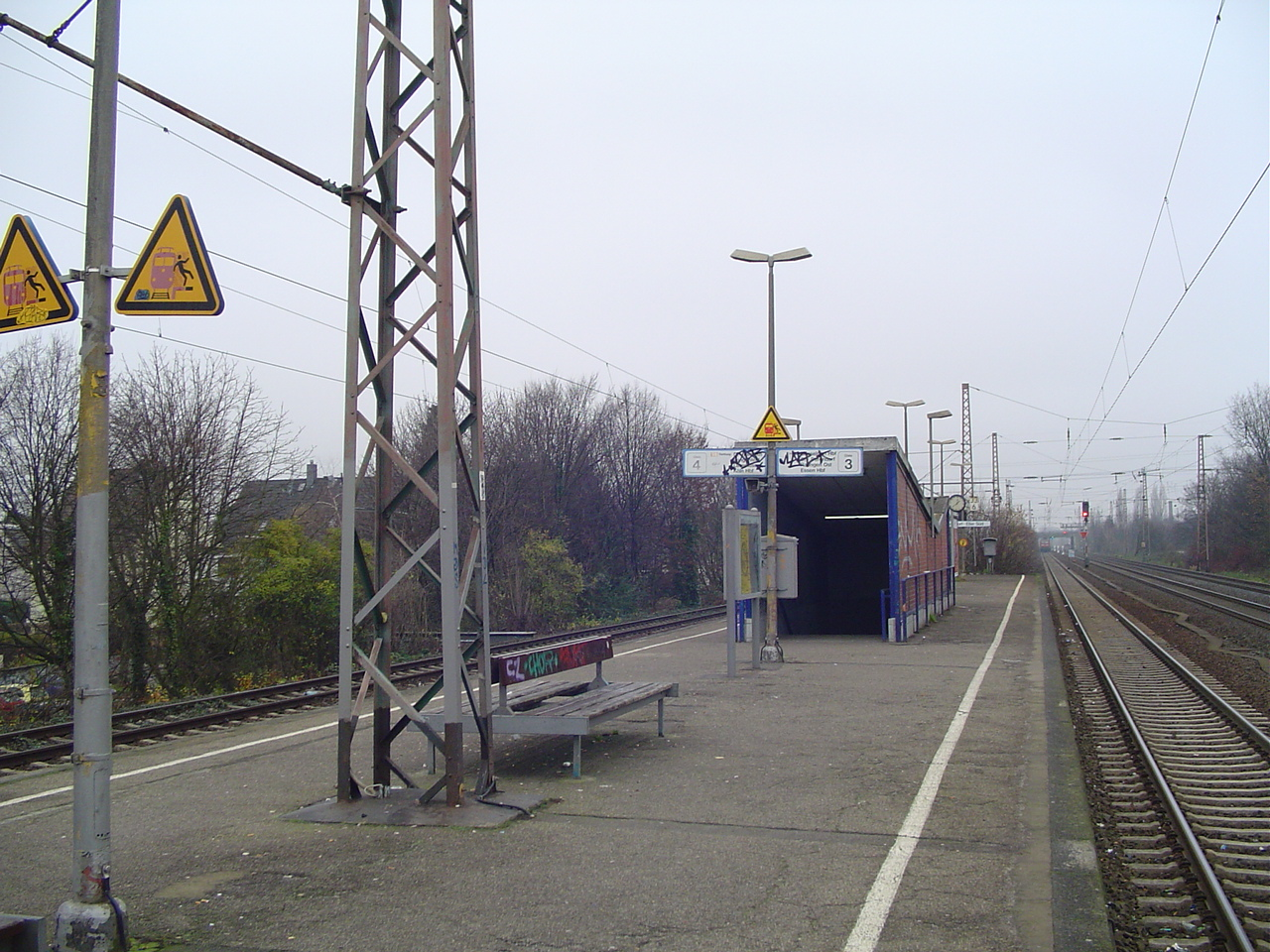

General information
- Location: Düsseldorf, NRW; Germany
- Coordinates: 51°11′52.5″N 6°50′10.8″E
- Lines: Cologne–Duisburg (KBS 450.6)
- Platforms: 2

Construction
- Accessible: Yes

Other information
- Station code: 1409
- DS100 code: KDES
- IBNR: 8001588
- Category: 5
- Fare zone: VRR: 430 and 530; VRS: 1430 and 1530 (VRR transitional zone)
- Website: www.bahnhof.de

History
- Opened: 1967

Services
Preceding station	Rhine-Ruhr S-Bahn	Following station
Düsseldorf-Reisholz towards Köln-Nippes	S6	Düsseldorf-Oberbilk towards Essen Hbf
Düsseldorf-Reisholz towards Langenfeld	S68	Düsseldorf-Oberbilk towards Wuppertal-Vohwinkel
Location

Düsseldorf-Eller Süd station is located approximately 5 kilometres south of Düsseldorf Hauptbahnhof in the district of Eller in the city of Düsseldorf in the German state of North Rhine-Westphalia. It is on the Cologne–Duisburg line and is classified by Deutsche Bahn as a category 5 station. It is served by Rhine-Ruhr S-Bahn line S6 every 20 minutes, and by a few services of line S68 during the peak hour.

== Location ==
The station is located between the districts of Düsseldorf-Wersten, Düsseldorf-Eller, and Dusseldorf-Oberbilk. It has a central island platform and is elevated above Karlsruher Straße, on which its entrance is located. A second entrance is located on the underpass between Sturmstraße and Konradstraße.

== Services ==
Currently, the station is served by two S-Bahn lines and four bus lines.
