= Chempark =

Industrial park in Germany

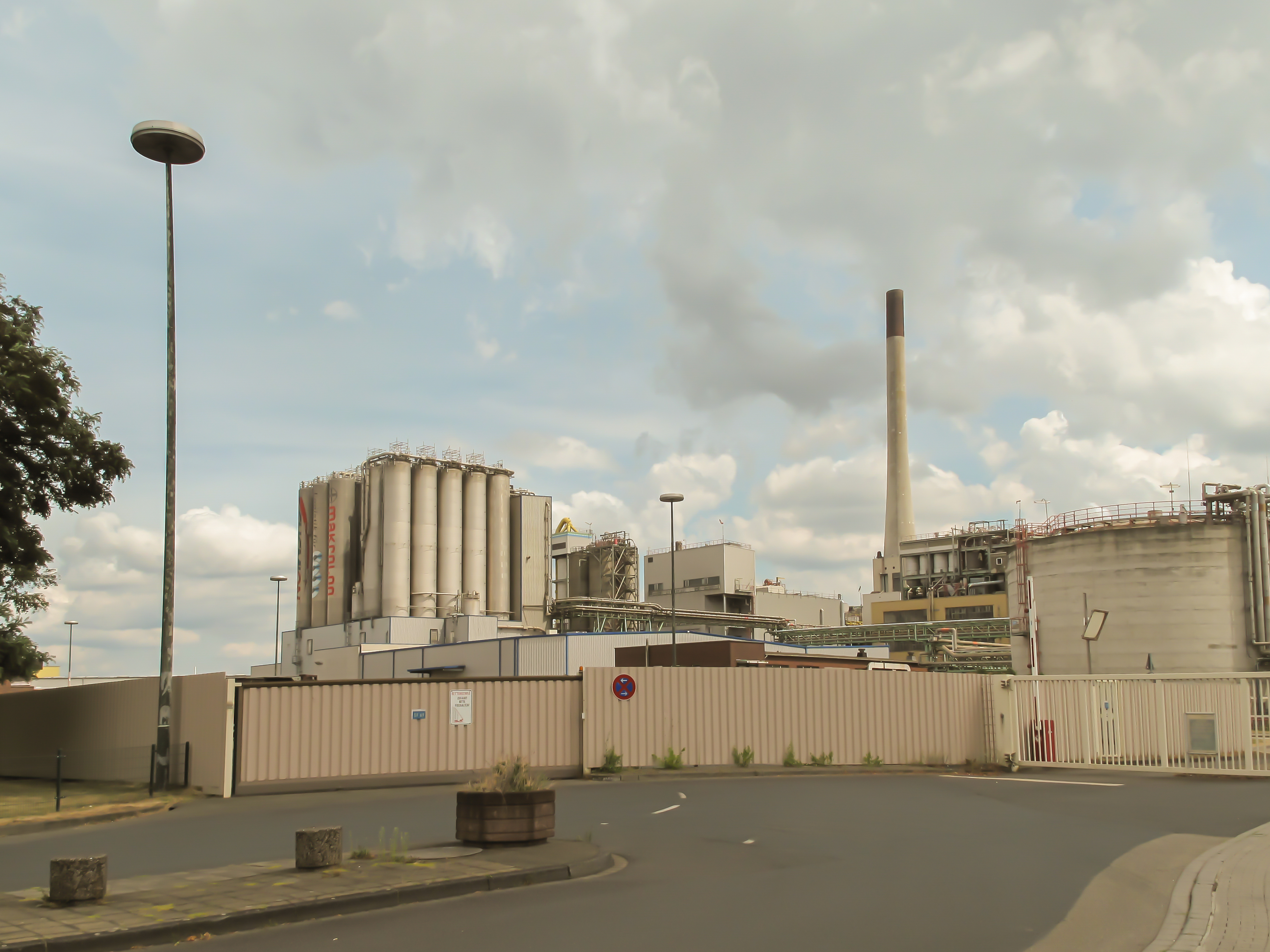
Chempark in Uerdingen

Chempark is an industrial park for the chemical industry in Germany. It is distributed across three sites in Leverkusen, Dormagen and Krefeld-Uerdingen cumulatively measuring 13.3 square kilometres, occupied by more than 60 companies and employing 50,000 people. Around one-third of North Rhine-Westphalia’s chemical output is produced at these three sites. It is operated by Currenta GmbH & Co. OHG, formerly known as Bayer Industry Services GmbH & Co. OHG.

== 2021 explosion ==
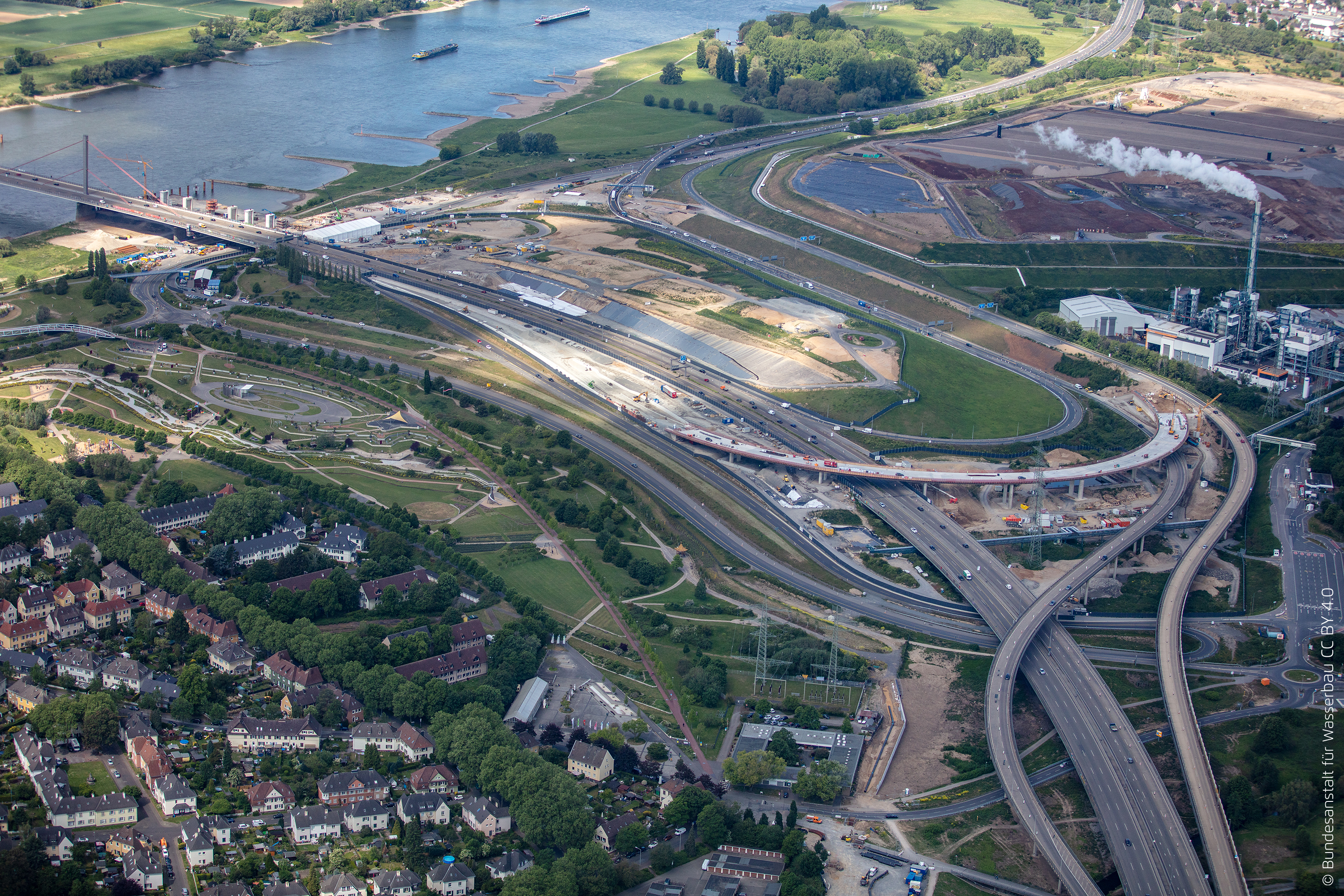
Chempark in Leverkusen-Bürrig (right)

On July 27, 2021, at 9:40 a.m. local time, an explosion occurred in the hazardous waste combustion section, blowing up several large containers of chemicals and contaminating large areas of the Rhine-Ruhr-valleys with toxic fallout from the large smoke cloud. The explosion killed at least six people, with one more person missing. Thirty-one others were injured. All the casualties were workers at the site.
