= Leverkusen Mitte station =

Railway station in Leverkusen, Germany

Leverkusen Mitte
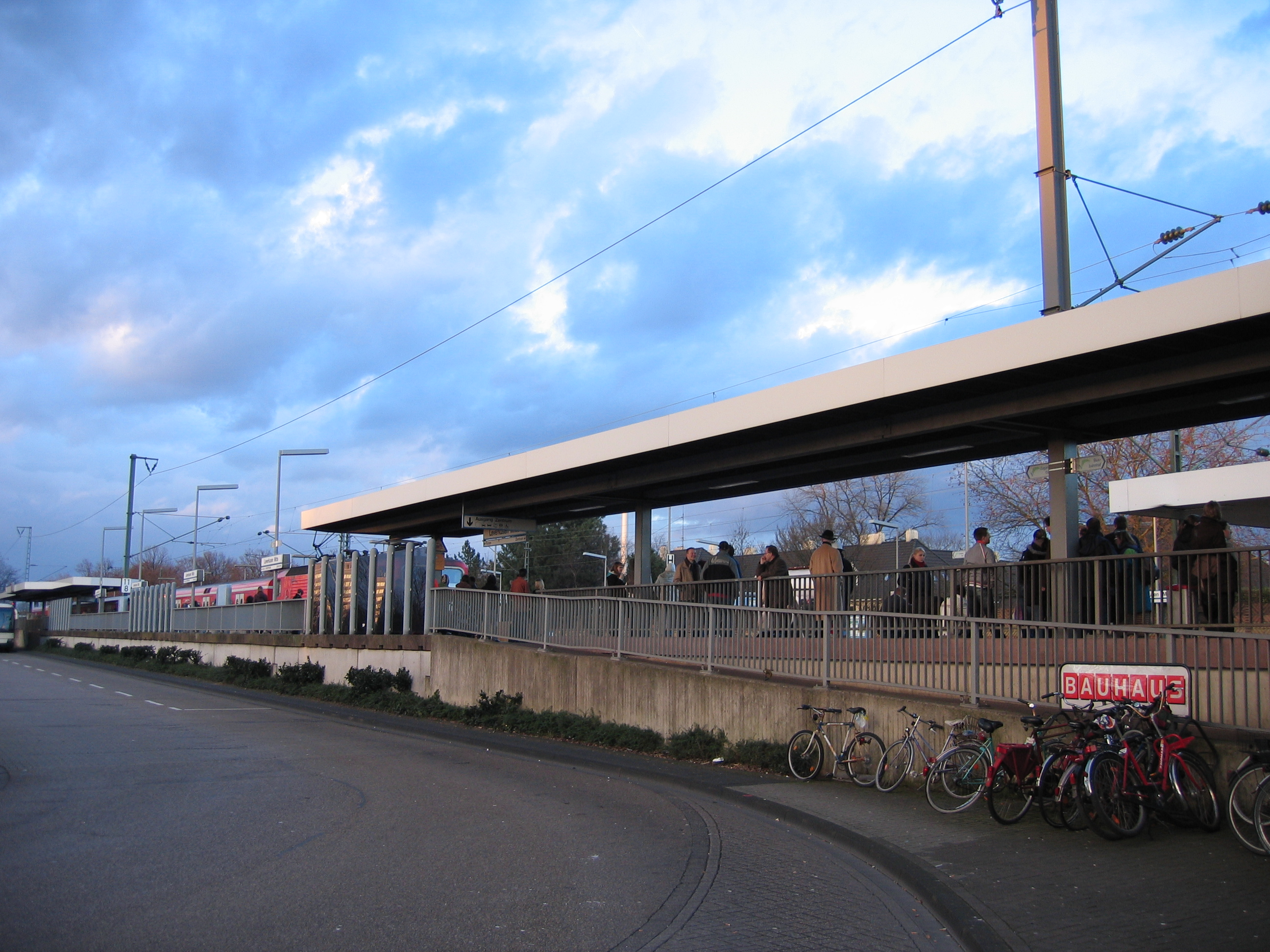

General information
- Location: Heinrich von Stephan Str. 1, Leverkusen, NRW; Germany
- Coordinates: 51°01′54″N 6°59′30″E
- Line: Cologne–Duisburg railway
- Platforms: 5
- Connections: RRX

Construction
- Accessible: Yes

Other information
- Station code: 3691
- DS100 code: KLMI
- IBNR: 8006713
- Category: 4
- Fare zone: VRS: 2200
- Website: www.bahnhof.de

History
- Opened: 1979

Services
Preceding station	National Express Germany	Following station
Köln-Mülheim towards Aachen Hbf	RE 1 (NRW-Express)	Düsseldorf-Benrath towards Hamm (Westf) Hbf
Köln-Mülheim towards Koblenz Hbf	RE 5 (Rhein-Express)	Düsseldorf-Benrath towards Wesel
Preceding station	Rhine-Ruhr S-Bahn	Following station
Leverkusen Chempark towards Köln-Nippes	S6	Leverkusen-Küppersteg towards Essen Hbf
Location

Leverkusen Mitte (Bahnhof Leverkusen Mitte) is a railway station on the Cologne–Duisburg railway, located in Leverkusen, Germany. It is classified by Deutsche Bahn as a category 4 station. It is served by the S6 line of the Rhine-Ruhr S-Bahn at 20-minute intervals.

== Train services ==
The station is served by the following services:

- Regional services RE 1 NRW-Express Aachen - Cologne - Düsseldorf - Duisburg - Essen - Dortmund - Hamm - Paderborn
- Regional services RE 5 Rhein-Express Emmerich - Wesel - Oberhausen - Duisburg - Düsseldorf - Cologne - Bonn - Koblenz
- Rhein-Ruhr S-Bahn services S6 Essen - Kettwig - Düsseldorf - Leverkusen- Cologne - Köln-Nippes

== Bus services ==
It is also served by the following bus routes: 201 (20 minute intervals), 203 (60), 204 (30), 208 (20), 209 (20), 211 (20) and 212 (20), 220 (20), 227 (20) and 233 (20), operated by Kraftverkehr Wupper-Sieg; and 250 (60) and 255 (20), operated by Kraftverkehr Gebr. Wiedenhoff.
