= Düsseldorf-Reisholz station =

Railway station in Düsseldorf, Germany

Düsseldorf Reisholz
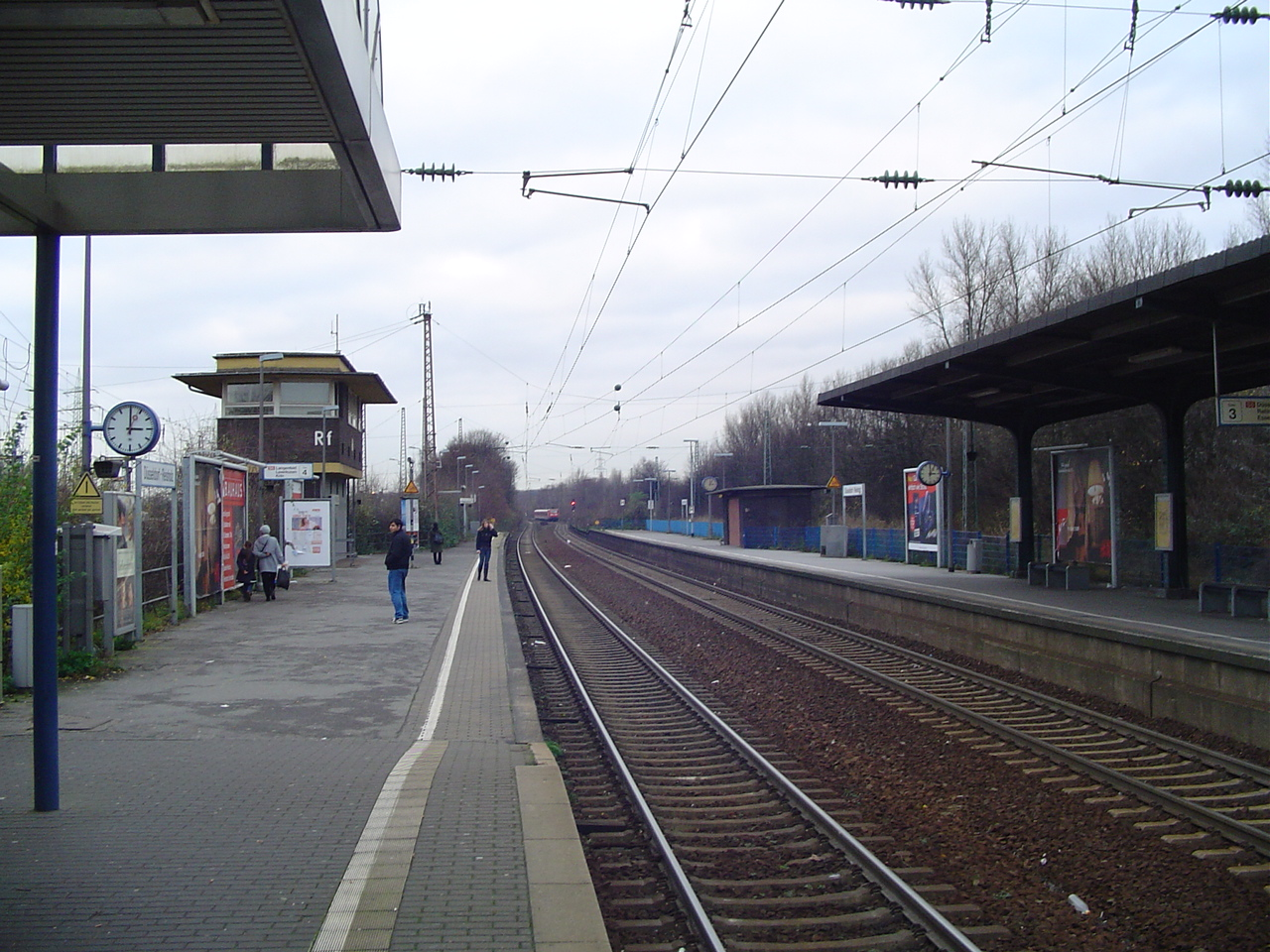

General information
- Location: Henkelstr. 317; Düsseldorf, NRW; Germany
- Coordinates: 51°10′50.7″N 6°51′40″E
- Lines: Cologne–Duisburg (KBS 450.6)
- Platforms: 2

Construction
- Accessible: Yes

Other information
- Station code: 1419
- DS100 code: KDRE
- IBNR: 8001594
- Category: 4
- Fare zone: VRR: 530; VRS: 1530 (VRR transitional zone)
- Website: www.bahnhof.de

History
- Opened: 1899

Services
| Preceding station | Rhine-Ruhr S-Bahn | Following station |
|---|---|---|
| Düsseldorf-Benrath towards Köln-Nippes | S6 | Düsseldorf-Eller-Süd towards Essen Hbf |
| Düsseldorf-Benrath towards Langenfeld | S68 | Düsseldorf-Eller-Süd towards Wuppertal-Vohwinkel |
Location

Düsseldorf-Reisholz is a railway station situated at Reisholz, Düsseldorf in western Germany. It is served by Rhine-Ruhr S-Bahn line S6 at 20-minute intervals and several services on line S68 during the peak.
