= Leverkusen =

- City
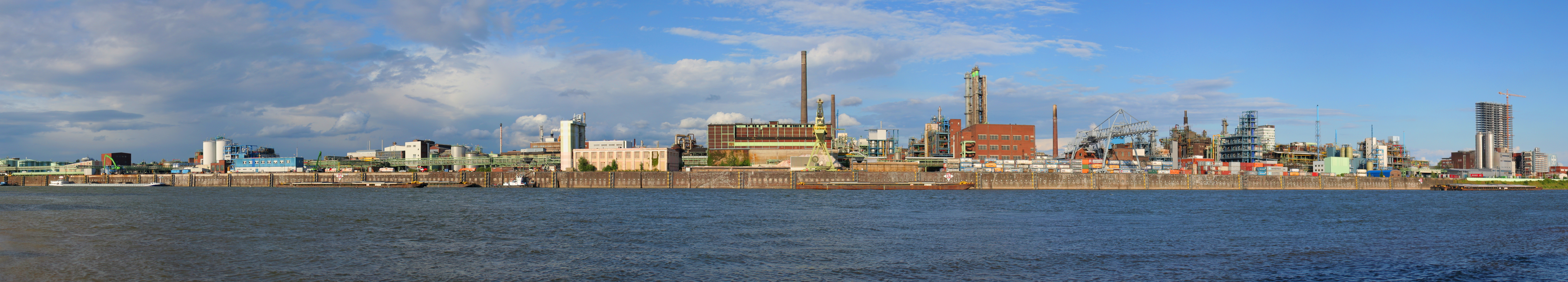
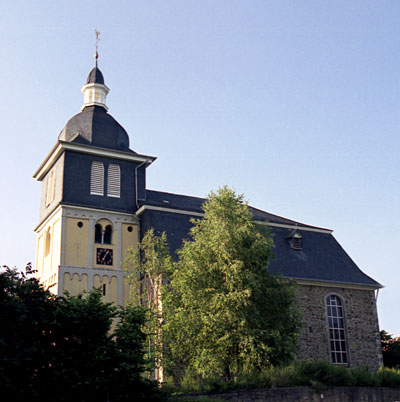
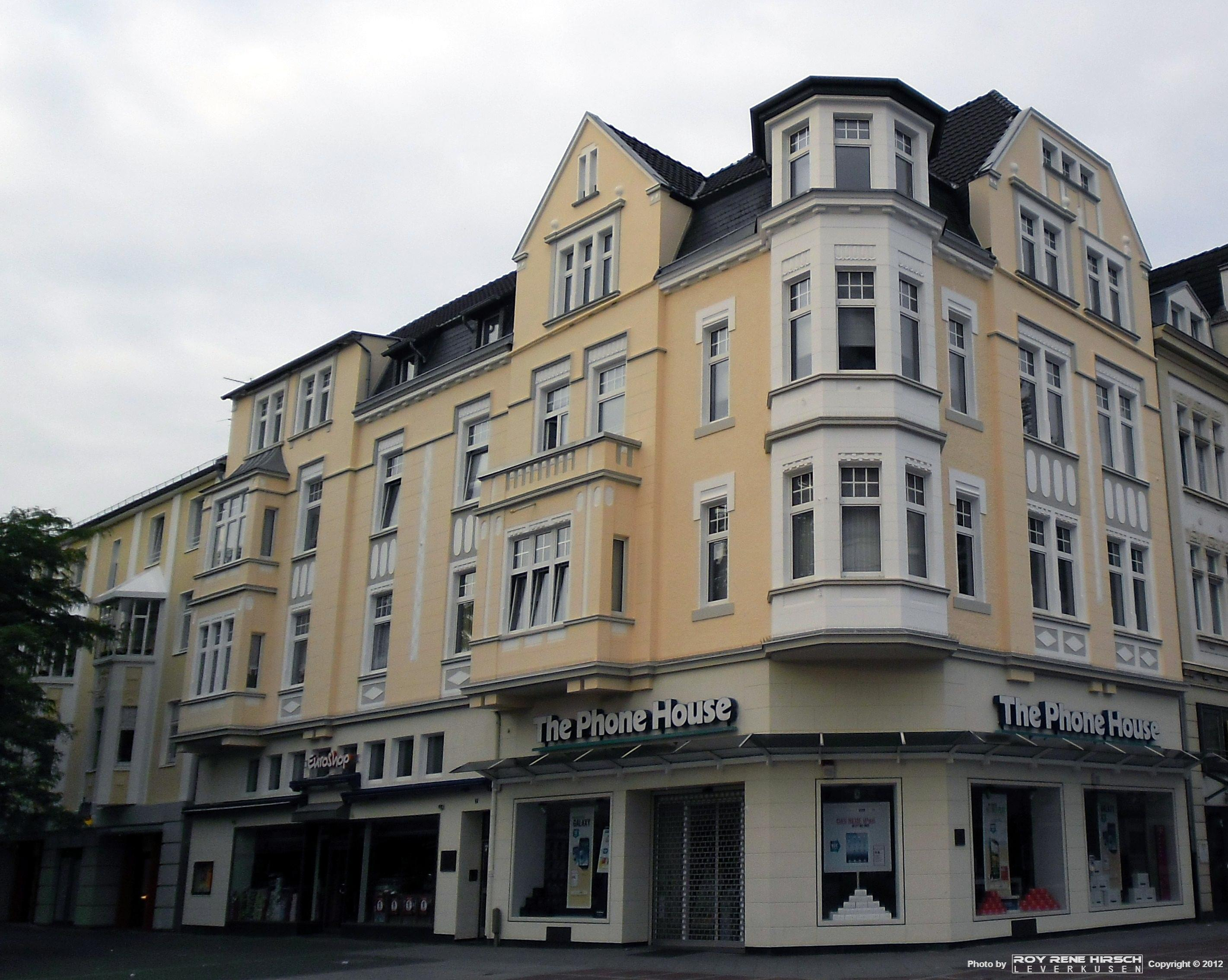
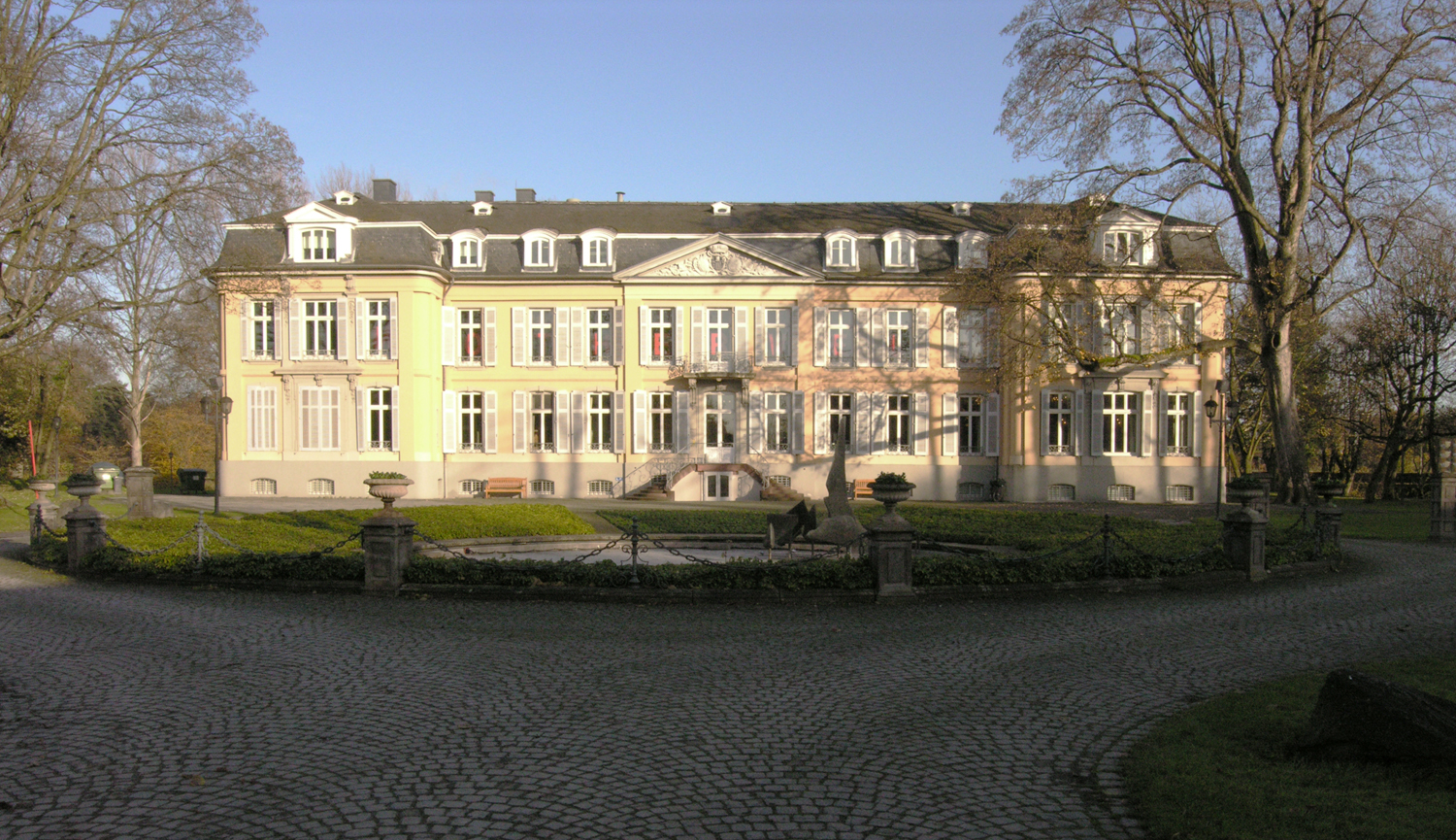
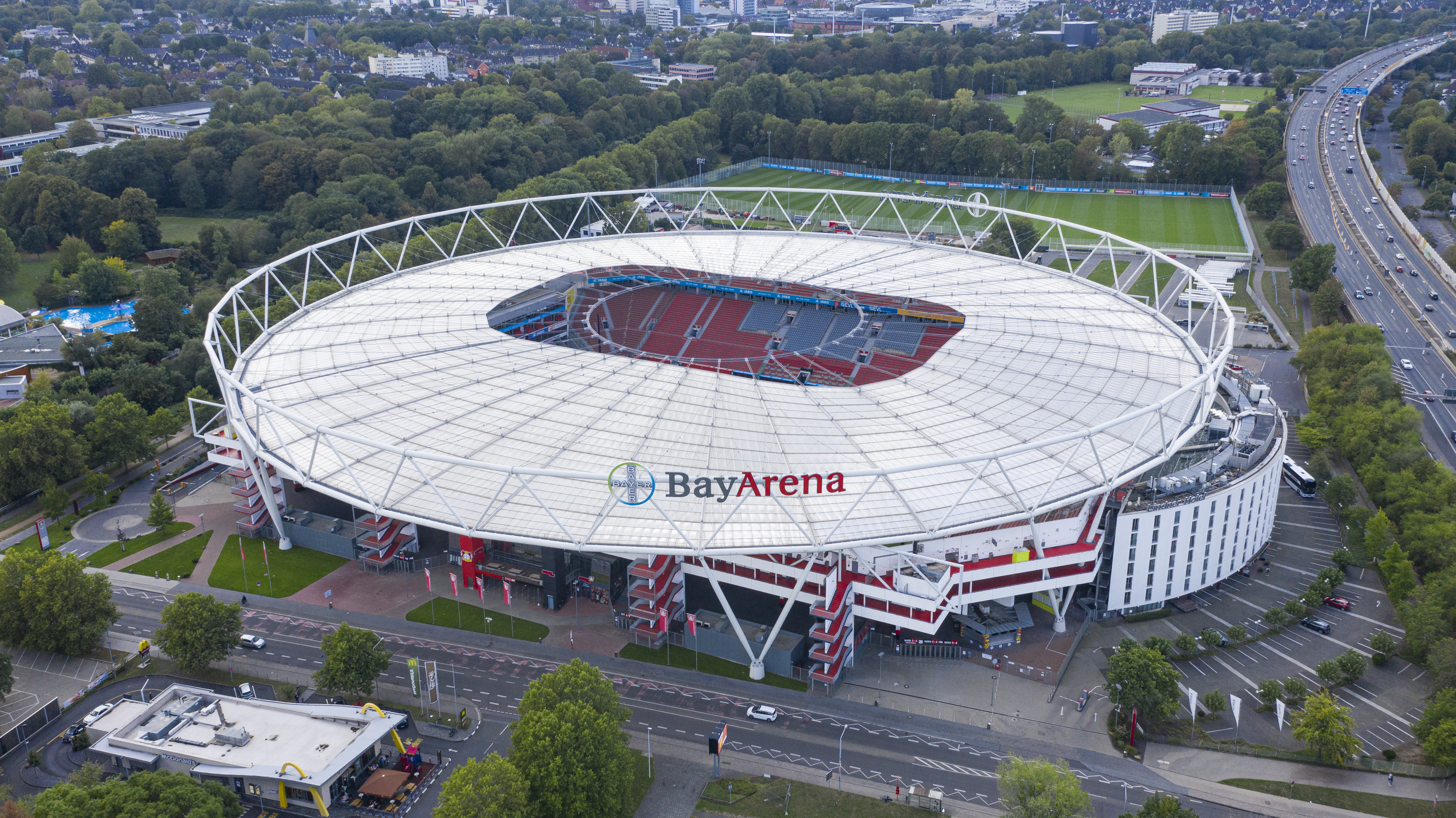
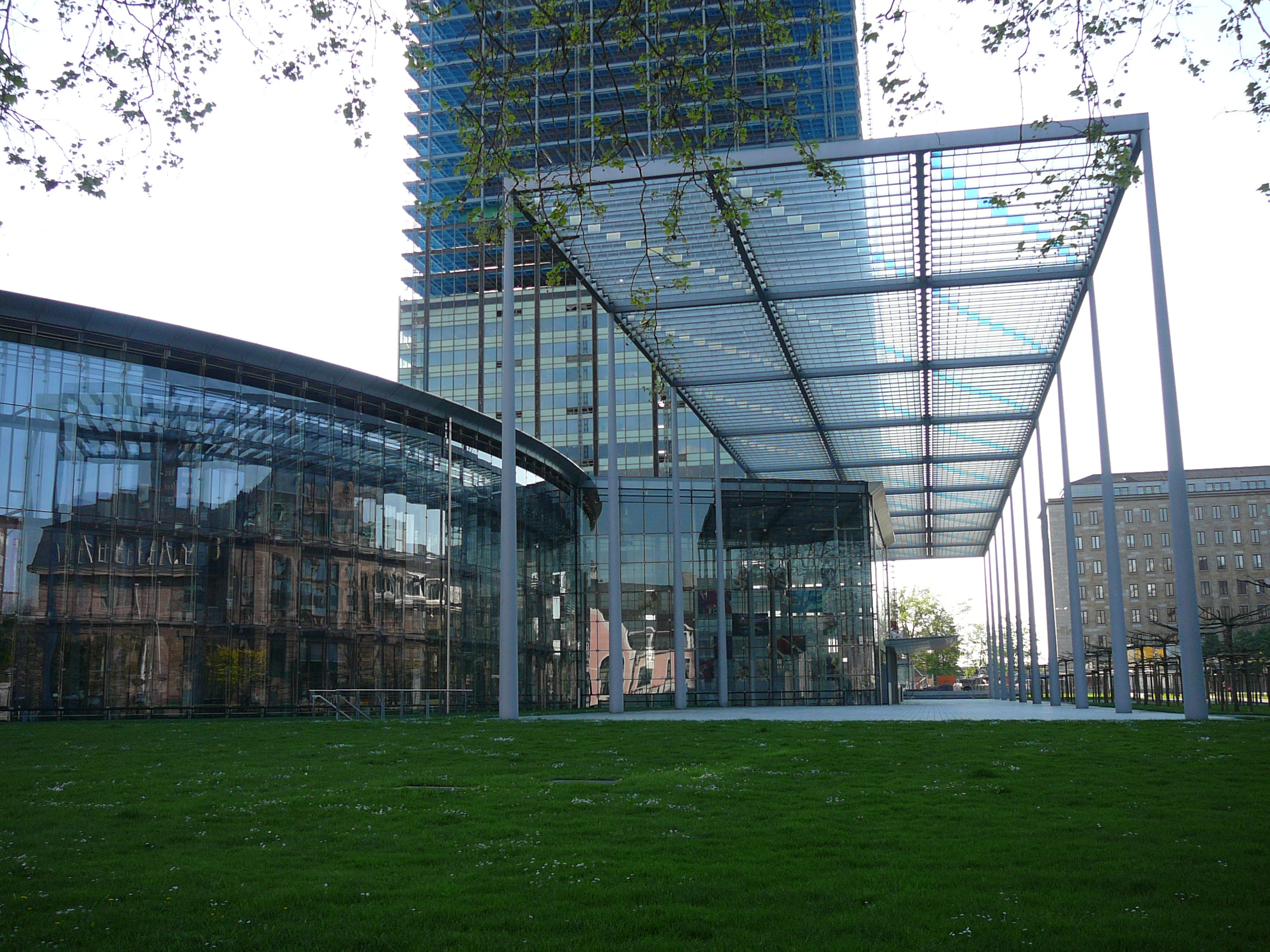
- Chempark Bergisch Neukirchen's old town Houses in Wiesdorf´s Gründerzeit old town Morsbroich Museum BayArena Bayer headquarters

- Flag Coat of arms

- Leverkusen within North Rhine-Westphalia
- Interactive map of Leverkusen
- Location within Germany Location within North Rhine-Westphalia
- Coordinates: 51°02′N 06°59′E
- Country: Germany
- State: North Rhine-Westphalia
- Admin. region: Köln
- District: Urban district

Government
  - Mayor (2025–30): Stefan Hebbel (CDU)
  - Governing parties: CDU/ SPD/ Bürgerliste

Area
  - Total: 78.85 km^{2} (30.44 sq mi)
- Elevation: 60 m (200 ft)

Population (2025-12-31)
  - Total: 168,299
  - Density: 2,134/km^{2} (5,528/sq mi)
- Time zone: UTC+01:00 (CET)
  - Summer (DST): UTC+02:00 (CEST)
- Dialling codes: 0214, 02171 & 02173
- Vehicle registration: LEV and OP
- Website: www.leverkusen.de

Leverkusen (German: [ˈleːvɐˌkuːzn̩]) is a city in North Rhine-Westphalia, Germany, on the eastern bank of the Rhine. To the south, Leverkusen borders the city of Cologne, and to the north the state capital, Düsseldorf. The city is part of the Rhine-Ruhr Metropolitan Region, one of Europe's largest urban areas.

With about 168,000 inhabitants, Leverkusen is one of the state's smaller cities. The city is known for the pharmaceutical company Bayer and its sports club Bayer Leverkusen.

== History ==
The heart of what is now Leverkusen was Wiesdorf, a village on the Rhine, which dates back to the 12th century. With the surrounding villages which have now been incorporated, the area also includes the rivers Wupper and Dhünn, and has suffered a lot from flooding, notably in 1571 and 1657, the latter resulting in Wiesdorf being moved East from the river to its present location.

Leverkusen was ravaged during the Cologne War (1583 to 1588). The entire area was rural until the late 19th century, when industry prompted the development that led to the city of Leverkusen, and to its becoming one of the most important centres of the German chemical industry.

The chemist Carl Leverkus, looking for a place to build a dye factory, chose Wiesdorf in 1860. He built a factory for the production of artificial ultramarine blue at the Kahlberg in Wiesdorf in 1861, and called the emerging settlement "Leverkusen" after his family home in Lennep. The factory was taken over by the Bayer company in 1891; Bayer moved its headquarters to Wiesdorf in 1912. After asset confiscation at the end of the First World War, it became IG Farben. The city of Leverkusen proper was founded in 1930 by merging Wiesdorf, Schlebusch, Steinbüchel and Rheindorf, and was posthumously named for Carl Leverkus.

During the Second World War, the IG Farben factories were bombed by the RAF on 22 August 1943, again by the RAF during bombing campaigns on 19/20 November, the USAAF Eighth Air Force on 1 December 1943, and finally once again by the RAF on 10/11 December 1943.

In 1975, Opladen (including Quettingen and Lützenkirchen since 1930), Hitdorf and Bergisch Neukirchen joined Leverkusen. The present city is made up of former villages, originally called Wiesdorf, Opladen, Schlebusch, Manfort, Bürrig, Hitdorf, Quettingen, Lützenkirchen, Steinbüchel, Rheindorf and Bergisch-Neukirchen.

On 27 July 2021, an explosion at the Chempark site in the city killed 7 people and injured 31 others.

== Demographics ==
Population development since 1832:

Historical population

Year	Pop.	±% p.a.
1832	11,442	—
1871	15,507	+0.78%
1900	24,974	+1.66%
1910	44,088	+5.85%
1925	61,404	+2.23%
1933	67,260	+1.15%
1939	75,171	+1.87%
1946	84,646	+1.71%
1950	98,867	+3.96%
1961	137,516	+3.05%
1965	153,352	+2.76%
1970	164,581	+1.42%

Year	Pop.	±% p.a.
1975	165,957	+0.17%
1980	160,834	−0.63%
1985	155,111	−0.72%
1990	160,919	+0.74%
1995	162,252	+0.17%
2000	161,047	−0.15%
2005	161,227	+0.02%
2010	160,772	−0.06%
2015	163,487	+0.34%
2020	163,905	+0.05%
2025	168,299	+0.53%

Source: Stadtgeschichte Leverkusen (1832-1961), Landesdatabank Nordrhein-Westfalen (1965-2025)

== Politics ==
Since November 1, 2025, Stefan Hebbel of the Christian Democratic Union (CDU) is the mayor of Leverkusen.

=== City council ===
Results of the 2020 city council election

The Leverkusen city council governs the city alongside the mayor. The most recent city council election was held on 13 September 2020, and the results were as follows:

Party	Votes	%	±	Seats	±
Christian Democratic Union (CDU)	16,859	27.8	▼4.7	14	▼3
Social Democratic Party (SPD)	15,276	25.2	▼3.1	13	▼1
Alliance 90/The Greens (Grüne)	11,015	18.2	▲8.8	9	▲4
Citizens' List Leverkusen (Bürgerliste)	3,630	6.0	▼1.0	3	▼1
Opladen Plus (OP)	3,601	5.9	▲0.7	3	±0
Alternative for Germany (AfD)	3,466	5.7	New	3	New
Free Democratic Party (FDP)	2,937	4.8	▲1.0	3	▲1
The Left (Die Linke)	2,092	3.4	▼0.4	2	±0
Citizens' Forum Green Leverkusen – Climate List (Büfo)	909	1.5	New	1	New
Awakening Leverkusen (AUF)	876	1.4	New	1	New
Valid votes	60,661	98.6			
Invalid votes	866	1.4			
Total	61,527	100.0		52	±0
Electorate/voter turnout	126,846	48.5	▲2.3		
Source: State Returning Officer

== Coat of arms ==
The coat of arms consists of the two-tailed rampant red lion of the Bergisches Land with a blue crown on a silver background and an embattled line in front.

== Main sights and places of interest ==
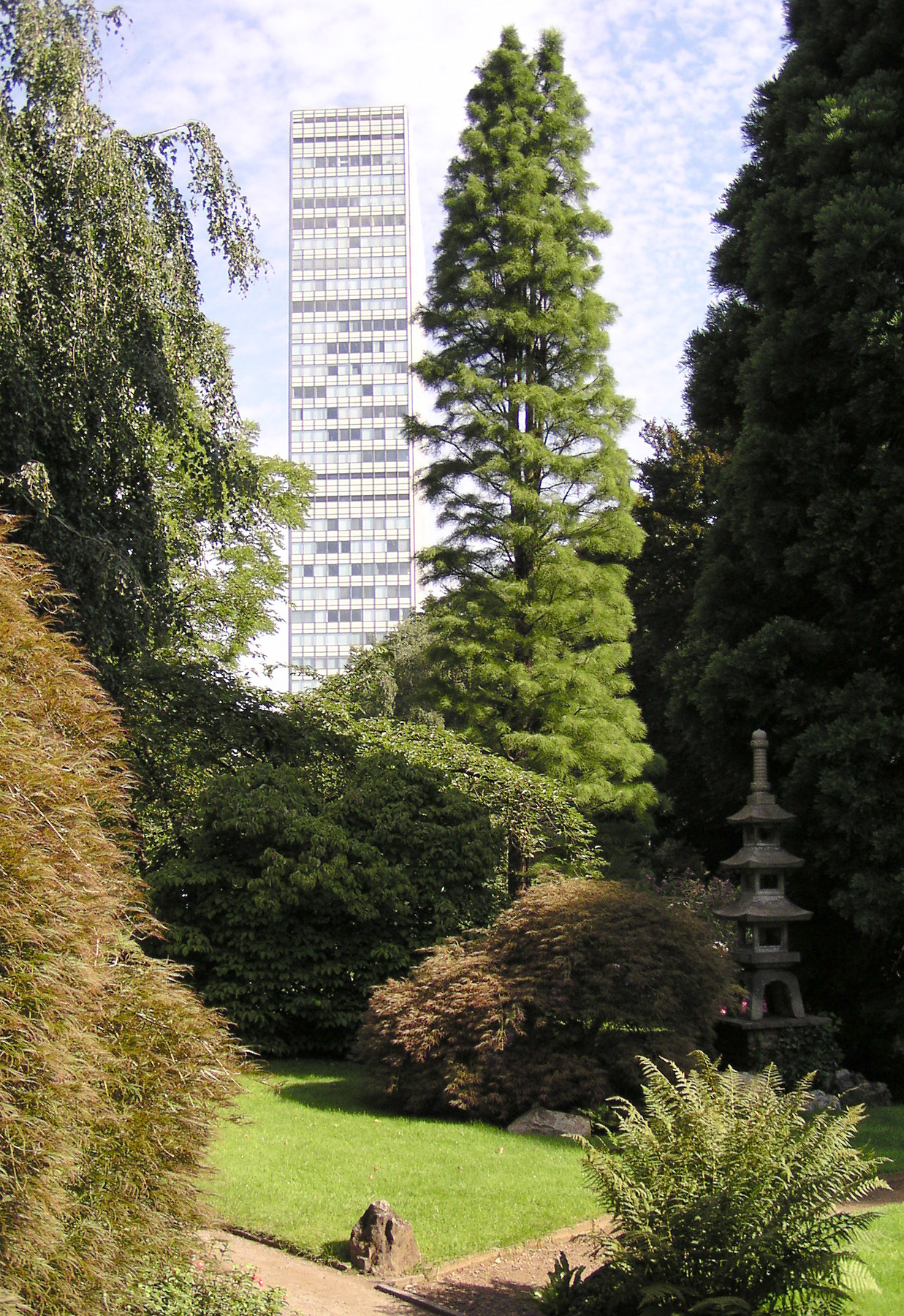
Japanese Garden in front of the Bayer tower

- BayArena is the home stadium of Bayer Leverkusen, with a capacity of over 30,000.
- The Bayer Cross Leverkusen is one of the largest illuminated advertisements in the world.
- Freudenthaler Sensenhammer is an industrial museum.
- Schloss Morsbroich – moated castle in the Baroque style, now a museum for contemporary art.
- Water Tower Leverkusen-Bürrig – 72.45-metre-high (237.7 ft) water reservoir containing an observation deck.
- Neuland Park – large park beside the Rhine.
- Japanese Garden – a 1913 garden extended by Carl Duisberg in 1923.
- Colony of workers – historical area in the form of houses and other buildings constructed for employees and families of the chemical works at the end of the 19th and beginning of 20th century.
- Einigkeit und Recht und Freiheit – historical boat bridge next to the Rhine, between Wiesdorf and Rheindorf.
- Mausoleum of Carl Duisberg – mausoleum in the centre of the Carl Duisberg Park, next to the Casino.
- NaturGut Ophoven – educational centre for nature in Leverkusen-Opladen.

Largest groups of foreign residents
Nationality	Population (2018)
Turkey	3,776
Italy	2,382
Poland	2,159
North Macedonia	1,956
Greece	1,254
Croatia	1,015
Others:	12,096

== Sports ==
The city is home of the football team Bayer Leverkusen, who won its first Bundesliga title in the 2023–24 season. It is also home of the basketball team Bayer Giants Leverkusen, which is the German record holder of national basketball championships. As of 2019, the team plays in the German ProA league and plays its home games in the Ostermann-Arena.

The Ostermann-Arena, previously known as Wilhelm Dopatka Halle and Smidt-Arena, was one of the host arenas for the FIBA EuroBasket 1985 (the official European Basketball Championship).

== Transport ==
There is no single central train station in Leverkusen. The Cologne-Düsseldorf railway and Cologne-Wuppertal railway traverse the city in north-south direction with several stations on each, most importantly Leverkusen Mitte station in Wiesdorf on the former and Opladen station in Opladen on the latter. Opladen also formerly held importance as the location of a railyard. Stations on both lines are served by regional trains. The line to Düsseldorf is also served by the Rhine-Ruhr S-Bahn and the Rhine-Ruhr Express.

Motorways A1 and A3 meet at the Kreuz Leverkusen, one of Germany's major highway crossings. It's located in the heart of the city (unusual for German cities, where highways usually bypass the centres) and is the northeastern corner of the Cologne Beltway.

The nearest airports to the city are Cologne Bonn Airport, located 22 km (14 mi) south, and Düsseldorf Airport, located 40 km (25 mi) northwest of Leverkusen.

== Twin towns – sister cities ==
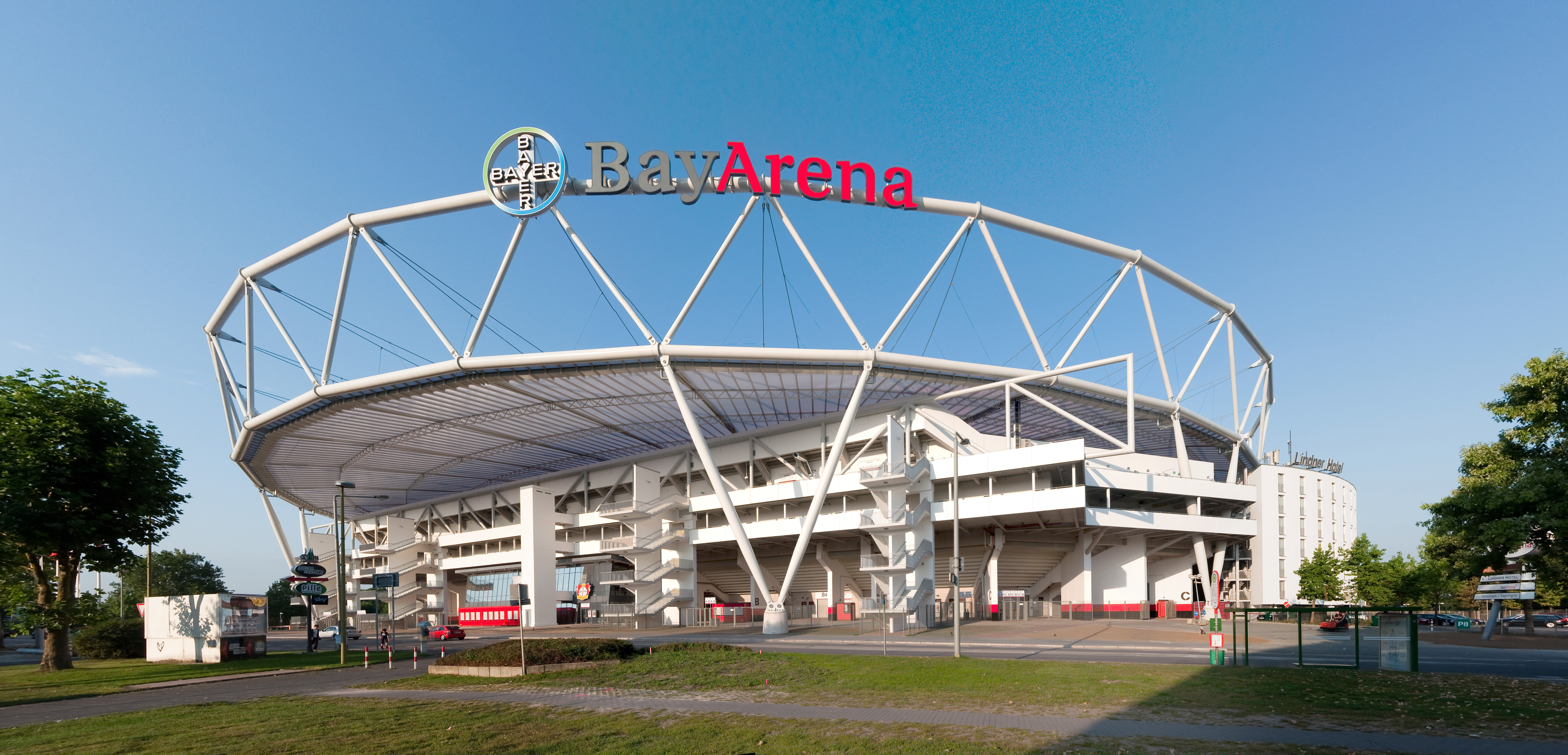
BayArena

Leverkusen is twinned with:

- Oulu, Finland (1968)
- Bracknell, England (1975)
- Ljubljana, Slovenia (1979)
- Nof HaGalil, Israel (1980)
- Chinandega, Nicaragua (1986)
- Schwedt, Germany (1989)
- Racibórz, Poland (2002)
- Villeneuve d'Ascq, France (2005)
- Wuxi, China (2014)
- Nikopol, Ukraine (2025)
- Delphi, Greece (2026)

== Notable people ==
- Lothar Rohde (1906–1985), scientist and founder of Rohde & Schwarz Messtechnik
- Heinrich Lützenkirchen (1909–1986), mayor of Leverkusen
- Paul Janes (1912–1987), footballer
- Wolf Vostell (1932–1988), sculptor, painter and happening artist
- Ileana Jacket (born 1947), telenovela actress
- Bärbel Dieckmann (born 1949), politician (SPD), mayor of Bonn 1994–2009
- Wilfried Schmickler (born 1954), comedian
- Andreas Hedwig (born 1959), archivist
- Dietmar Mögenburg (born 1961), athlete
- Detlef Schrempf (born 1963), basketball player
- Sabine Moussier (born 1966), Mexican telenovela actress
- Uta Briesewitz (born 1967), cinematographer
- Ralf Schmitz (born 1974), actor and comedian
- Jörg Bergmeister (born 1976), racing driver
- Ji-In Cho (born 1976), heavy metal singer
- Danny Ecker (born 1977), pole vaulter
- Felix Sturm (born 1979), middleweight boxer

== Sources ==
- Blaschke, Stefan (1999): Unternehmen und Gemeinde: Das Bayerwerk im Raum Leverkusen 1891-1914 Cologne: SH-Verlag, ISBN 3-89498-068-0 (German)
- Archive of Leverkusen (2005): Leverkusen. Geschichte einer Stadt am Rhein. Bielefeld: Verlag für Regionalgeschichte, ISBN 3-89534-575-X (German)
- Franz Gruß (1987): Geschichte und Porträt der Stadt Leverkusen. Leverkusen: Verlag Anna Gruß, ISBN 3-930478-03-X (German)
