= Hösel station =

Railway station in Ratingen, Germany

Hösel
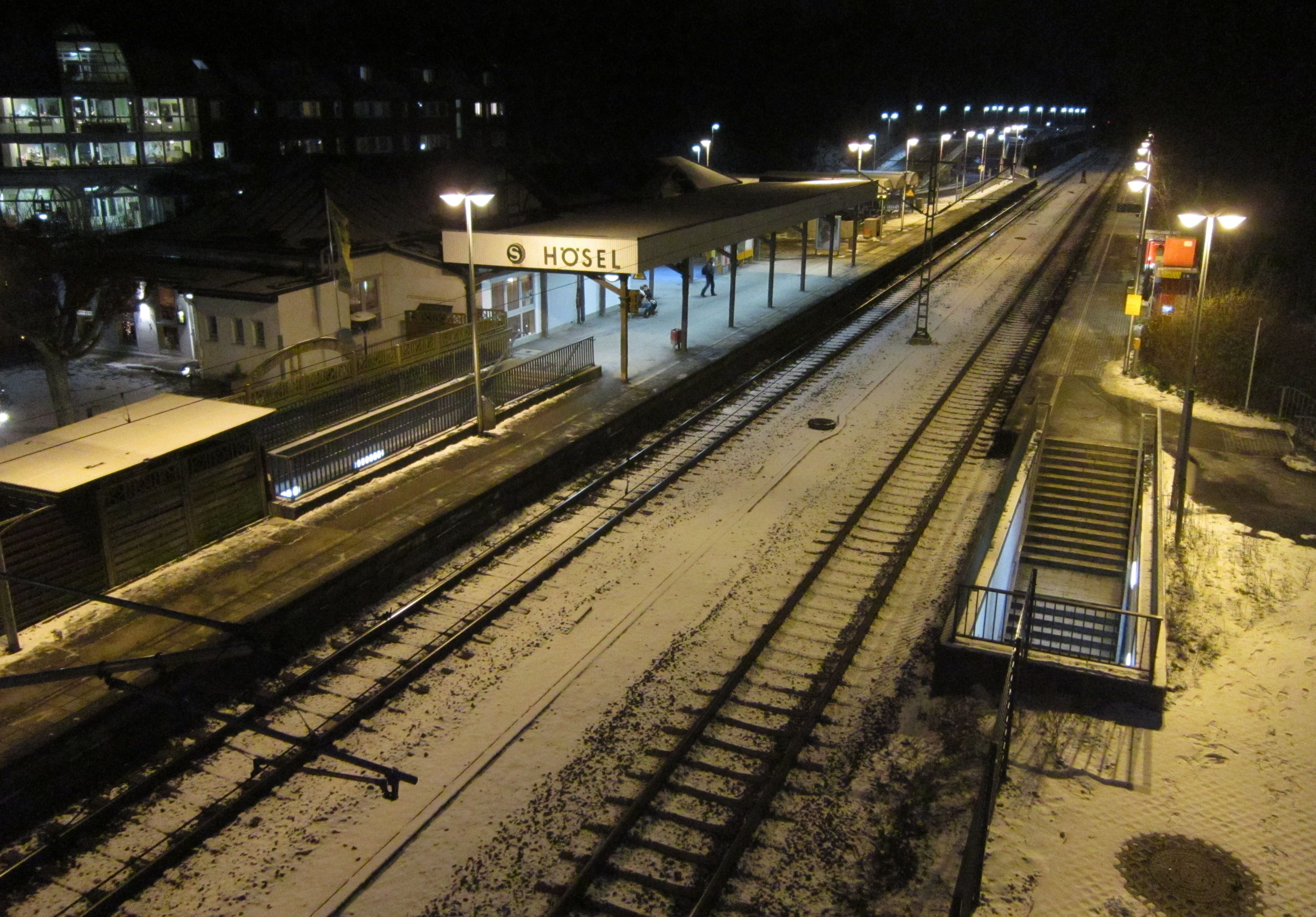
- Hösel station on a winter night

General information
- Location: Bahnhofstr. 1 Ratingen-Hösel, NRW; Germany
- Coordinates: 51°20′29″N 6°53′37″E
- Lines: Ruhr Valley Railway (KBS 450.6)
- Platforms: 2

Construction
- Accessible: Yes

Other information
- Station code: 2926
- DS100 code: EHOS
- IBNR: 8002919
- Category: 5
- Fare zone: VRR: 442
- Website: www.bahnhof.de

History
- Opened: 1 February 1872

Services
Preceding station	Rhine-Ruhr S-Bahn	Following station
Ratingen Ost towards Köln-Nippes	S6	Kettwig Stausee towards Essen Hbf
Location

Hösel is a railway station in Ratingen in western Germany. It serves the outlying town part of Hösel.

== Operational usage ==
The station today sees regular service by Rhein-Ruhr S-Bahn trains on line S6.
