= Ratingen Ost station =

Railway station in Ratingen, Germany

Ratingen Ost
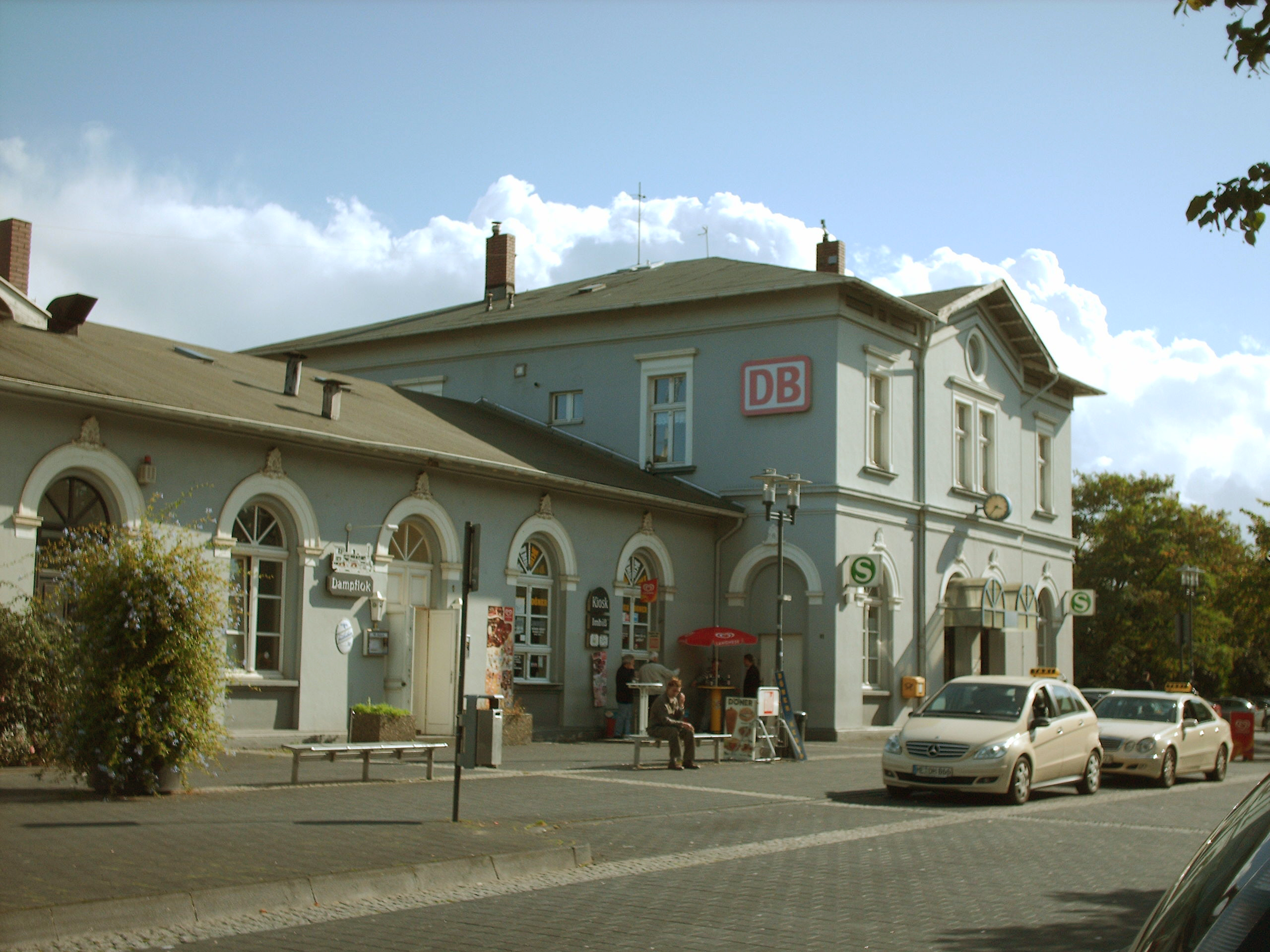
- Ratingen Ost station in 2007

General information
- Location: Am Ostbahnhof 1, Ratingen, NRW; Germany
- Coordinates: 51°17′43″N 6°51′48″E
- Lines: Ruhr Valley Railway (KBS 450.6)
- Platforms: 2

Construction
- Accessible: Yes

Other information
- Station code: 5136
- DS100 code: KRAO
- Category: 5
- Fare zone: VRR: 440
- Website: www.bahnhof.de

History
- Opened: 1 February 1872

Services
Preceding station	Rhine-Ruhr S-Bahn	Following station
Düsseldorf-Rath towards Köln-Nippes	S6	Hösel towards Essen Hbf
Location

Ratingen Ost is a station situated in Ratingen in the German state of North Rhine Westphalia and is a station of the Rhine-Ruhr S-Bahn.

It was opened in 1872 as the Ratingen station of the Bergisch-Märkische Railway Company (German: Bergisch-Märkische Eisenbahn-Gesellschaft, BME) along with the Ruhr Valley Railway. After the nationalisation of the BME, it received its current name in the 19th century. The station is located between the Ratingen districts of Ost (east) and Mitte (central) and is mainly used by commuters into Düsseldorf.

From the former freight yard, the now dismantled railway sidings ran to the nearby firms of the Balcke-Dürr company and the Wilhelm Pulch foundry and steelworks. The former freight yard was replaced by a parking lot.

Ratingen Ost station is served by line S6 of the Rhine-Ruhr S-Bahn at 20-minute intervals and has an island platform with its entrance at the northern end of the platform. There is direct access from the bus station, which is served by ten bus lines, as well as the parking area on Josef-Schappe-Straße. Until the conversion for the S-Bahn, the station had a home platform (next to the station building) and two island platforms.
