= Düsseldorf-Rath =

City district of Düsseldorf, Germany

Coordinates: 51°15′58″N 6°48′51″E

Map of Düsseldorf, showing Rath (in red) within Borough 6 (in pink)

Rath (German pronunciation: [ʁaːt]) is a quarter in northern Düsseldorf, part of Borough 6. It is about 5 km northeast of the city center, near the airport. It has an area of 10.42 km^{2} (4.02 sq mi), and 20,483 inhabitants (2020).

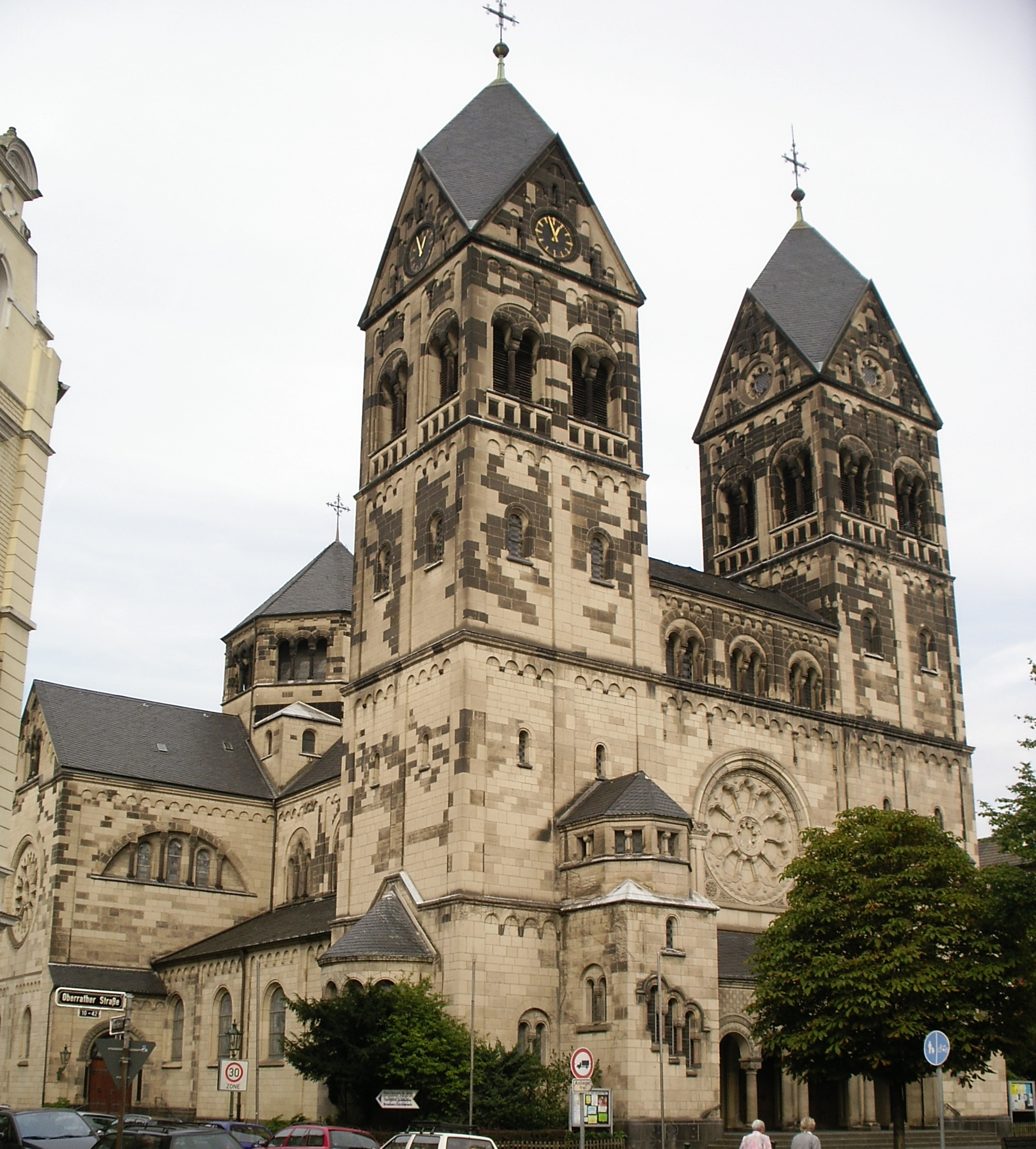
St Josef Church

== History ==
The Rath area was occupied since at least the Mesolithic. Flint artifacts from the Neolithic and pottery and dwellings from the Bronze Age have been found in Düsseldorf-Rath. In the Iron Age Rath was a center for the Hallstatt Celtic culture, and a ceremonial site has been excavated.

Historically, Rath was mentioned as early as 1375, but Rath and its environs remained rural and agricultural until 1897 with the establishment of the Mannesmann Röhren Gross Lager Gmbh tube-rolling mill, which created the industrial character that the borough retains even today. In 1909 Rath together with Unterrath and Lichtenbroich were incorporated into Düsseldorf at their own request. Recently Düsseldorf office parks have started to take advantage of the less expensive land in Rath coupled with its excellent transportation network.

== Attractions ==
The new ISS Dome is a multipurpose stadium which opened in September 2006. It is located on Theodorstraße and seats up to 13,400 spectators. It is conveniently located near the A52 autobahn (motorway) and will have a large parking garage attached. The ISS-Dome will be the new home of the Düsseldorfer EG, today known as DEG Metro Stars, a successful ice hockey club that has won six German championships.

== Transportation ==
Rath's two train stations, Düsseldorf-Rath Mitte and Düsseldorf-Rath, are on the Ruhr Valley Railway and are served by line S6 trains of the Rhine-Ruhr S-Bahn (operated by the Verkehrsverbund Rhein-Ruhr, VRR) on the Cologne-Essen route. They are only nine to twelve minutes from the main station in downtown Düsseldorf.

In addition, the street-car lines 701, U71 and U72 of the Rheinbahn run to Rath. The A44 and the A52 autobahns intersect in Rath, making it an ideal warehousing district for Düsseldorf.
