= Düsseldorf-Rath Mitte station =

Railway station in Düsseldorf, Germany

Düsseldorf Rath Mitte
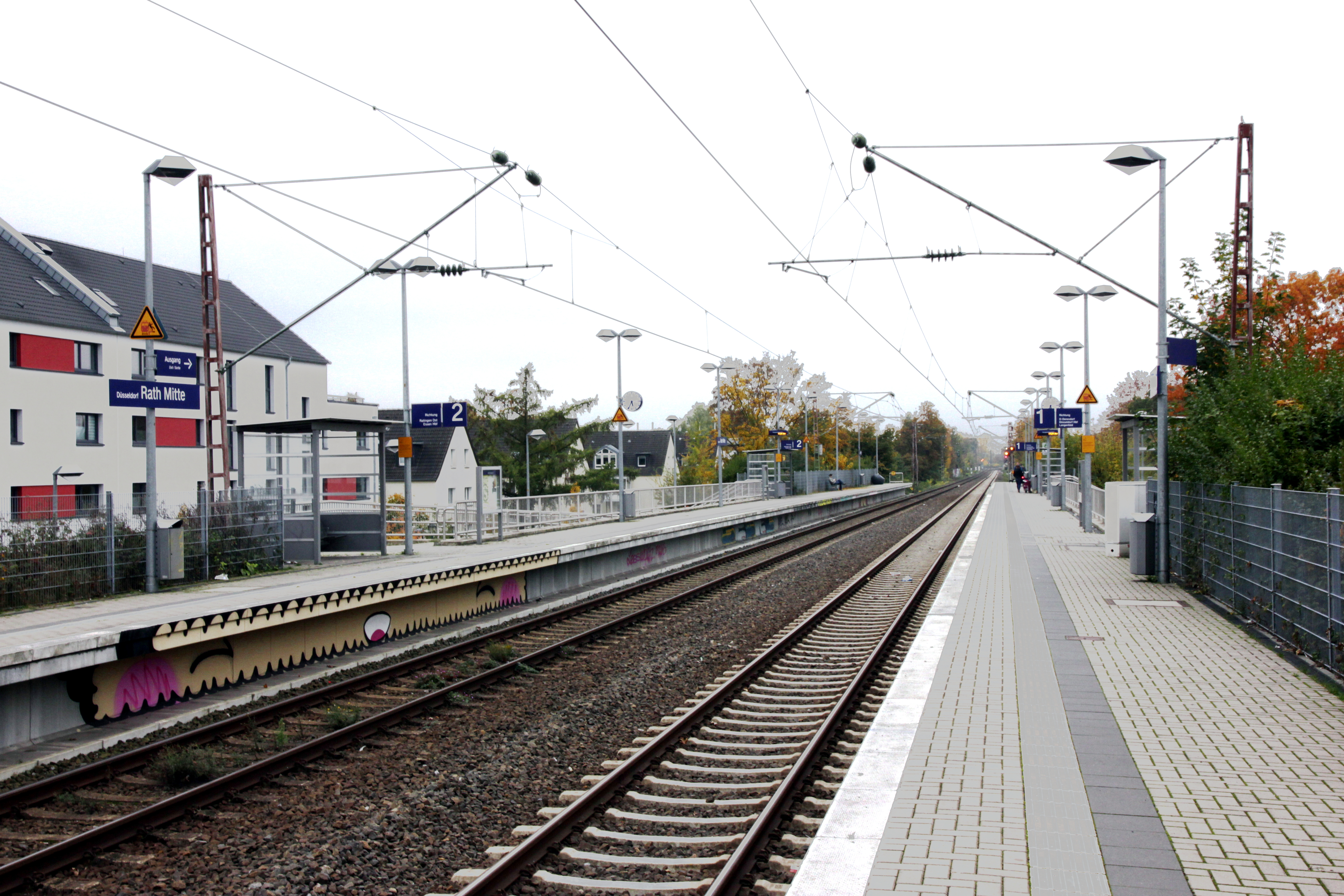

General information
- Location: Münsterstr. 63; Düsseldorf-Rath, Düsseldorf, NRW; Germany
- Coordinates: 51°15′40″N 6°48′29″E
- Lines: Ruhr Valley Railway (KBS 450.6)
- Platforms: 2

Construction
- Accessible: Yes

Other information
- Station code: 1417
- DS100 code: KDRM
- IBNR: 8001593
- Category: 5
- Fare zone: VRR: 432; VRS: 1430 (VRR transitional zone)
- Website: www.bahnhof.de

History
- Opened: 1967

Services
| Preceding station | Rhine-Ruhr S-Bahn | Following station |
|---|---|---|
| Düsseldorf-Derendorf towards Köln-Nippes | S6 | Düsseldorf-Rath towards Essen Hbf |
| Preceding station | Rhine-Ruhr Stadtbahn | Following station |
| Rotdornstraße towards Düsseldorf-Rath | U71 | Am Schein towards Benrath Betriebshof |
Location

Düsseldorf-Rath Mitte is a railway station situated at Rath, Düsseldorf in western Germany. It is served by line S6 of the Rhine-Ruhr S-Bahn. Stadtbahn line U71 and tram line 701, both operated by Rheinbahn, also serve the station.
