= Düsseldorf-Rath station =

Railway station in Düsseldorf, Germany

Düsseldorf Rath
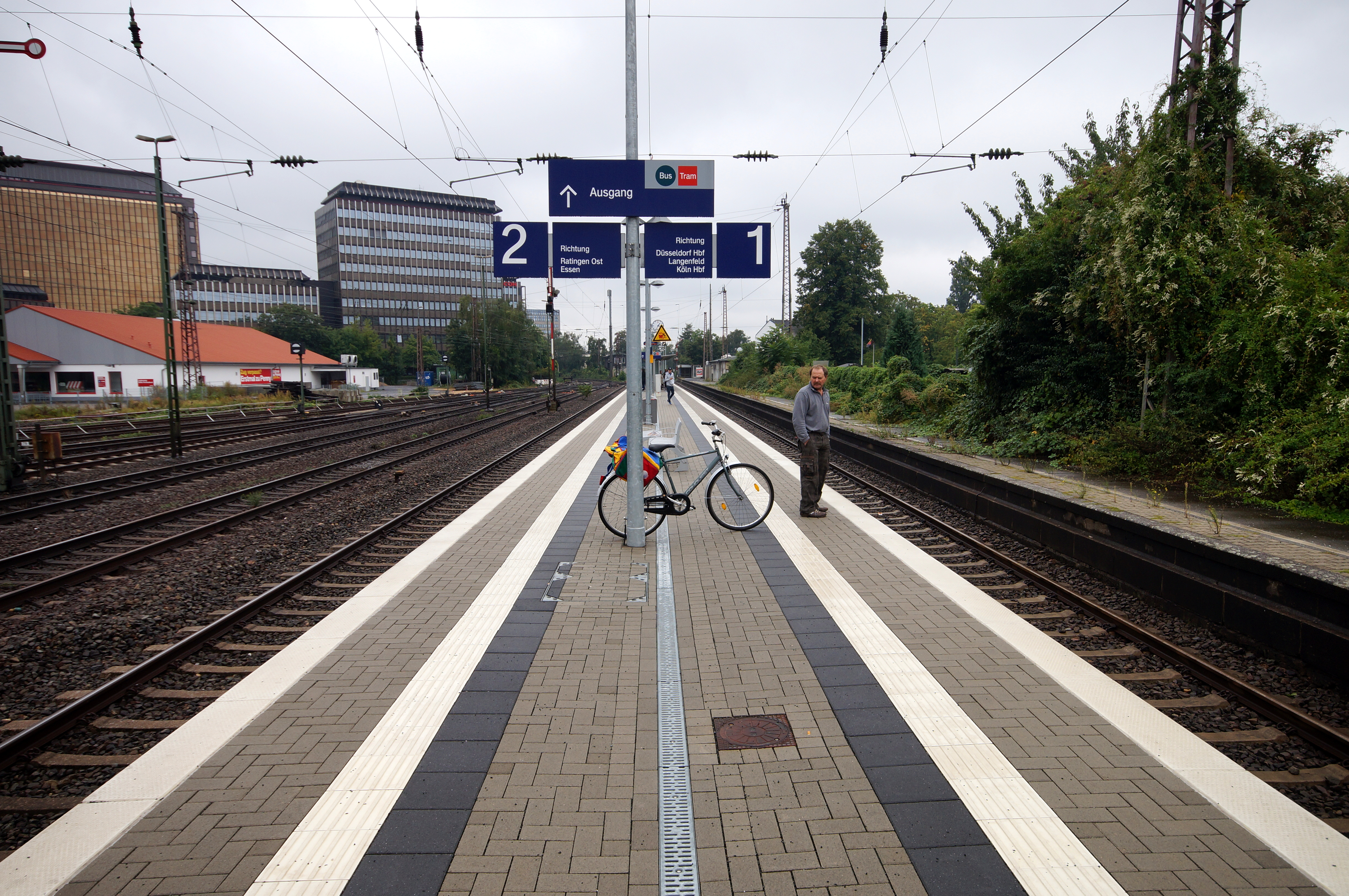

General information
- Location: Westfalenstr. 92; Düsseldorf-Rath, Düsseldorf, NRW; Germany
- Coordinates: 51°15′50″N 6°49′15″E
- Lines: Ruhr Valley Railway (KBS 450.6)
- Platforms: 2

Construction
- Accessible: Yes

Other information
- Station code: 1417
- DS100 code: KDR
- IBNR: 8001592
- Category: 5
- Fare zone: VRR: 432; VRS: 1430 (VRR transitional zone)
- Website: www.bahnhof.de

History
- Opened: 19 November 1874

Services
| Preceding station | Rhine-Ruhr S-Bahn | Following station |
|---|---|---|
| Düsseldorf-Rath Mitte towards Köln-Nippes | S6 | Ratingen Ost towards Essen Hbf |
| Preceding station | Rhine-Ruhr Stadtbahn | Following station |
| Terminus | U71 | Rotdornstraße towards Benrath Betriebshof |
Location

Düsseldorf-Rath is a railway station situated at Rath, Düsseldorf in western Germany. It is served by line S6 of the Rhine-Ruhr S-Bahn. It is also served by line U71 of the Düsseldorf Stadtbahn and tram line 701.
