= Kettwig Stausee station =

Railway station in Essen, Germany

Kettwig Stausee
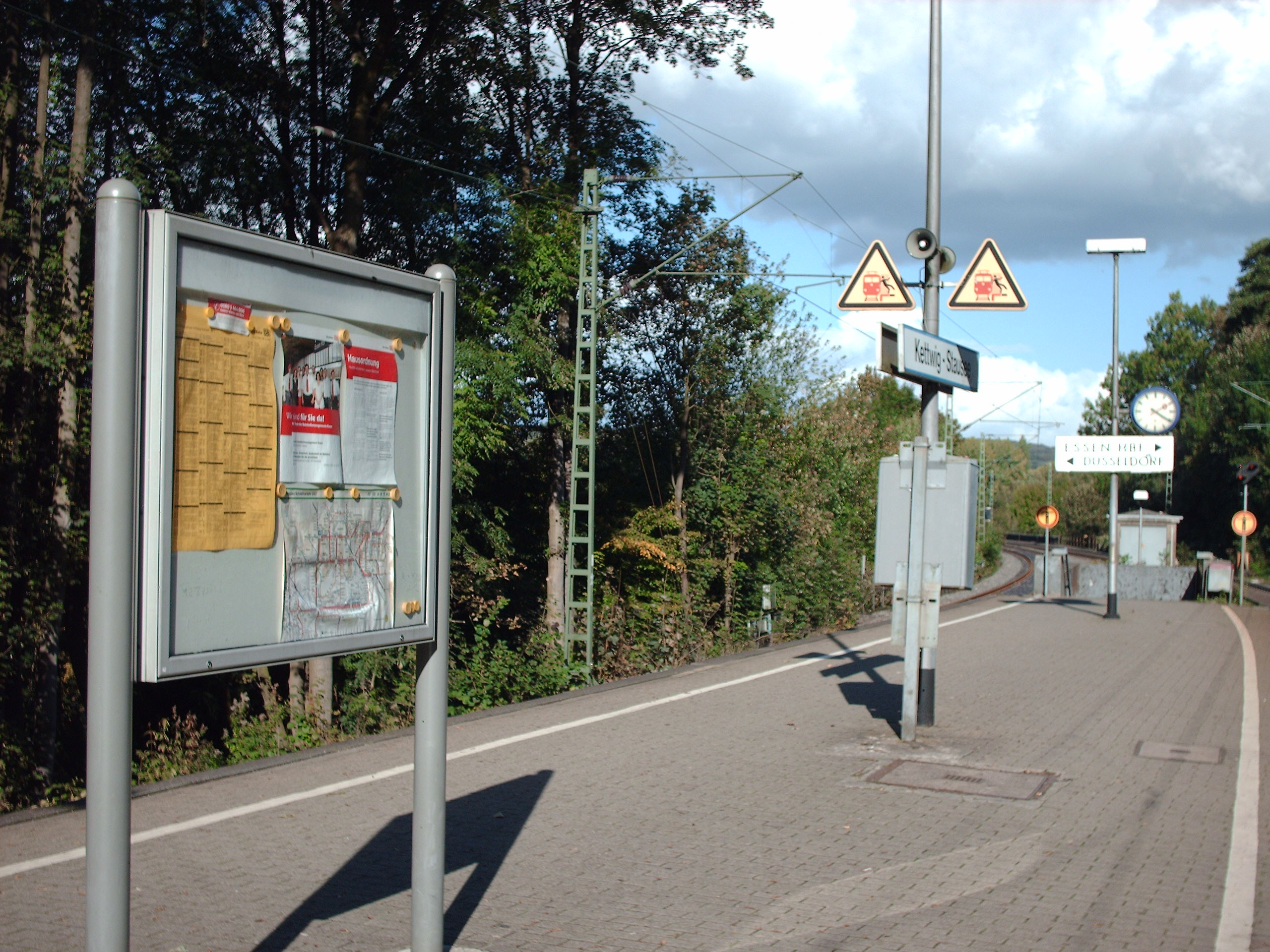

General information
- Other names: Kettwig-Pusch
- Location: Werdener Str. 77; Kettwig, Essen, NRW; Germany
- Coordinates: 51°21′23″N 6°56′20″E
- Lines: Ruhr Valley Railway (KBS 450.6); formerly Lower Ruhr Valley Railway
- Platforms: 2

Construction
- Accessible: No

Other information
- Station code: 3167
- DS100 code: EKGS
- Category: 6
- Fare zone: VRR: 450
- Website: www.bahnhof.de

History
- Opened: 28 May 1945

Key dates
- 1968/1974: S-Bahn service started

Services
| Preceding station | Rhine-Ruhr S-Bahn | Following station |
|---|---|---|
| Hösel towards Köln-Nippes | S6 | Kettwig towards Essen Hbf |
Location

Kettwig Stausee is a railway station in the city of Essen in western Germany on the Ruhr Valley line. It serves the southern part of the Kettwig borough, Kettwig vor der Brücke, and is situated right next to the river Ruhr.

== History ==
The station was opened in 1945 as Kettwig-Pusch after the German army had destroyed the Ruhr bridges in Kettwig during the last days of World War II. It was used to connect the railway lines to Mülheim an der Ruhr, Düsseldorf and Velbert with each other. After a single Ruhr bridge was rebuilt, the station was renamed Kettwig Stausee in 1953. In 1960, services to Velbert and in 1968 services to Mülheim ended. The station building was torn down in 1981, and the station was downgraded to a mere S-Bahn stop.

The station today sees regular service by Rhein-Ruhr S-Bahn trains on the S6 line.
