= Lower Ruhr Valley Railway =

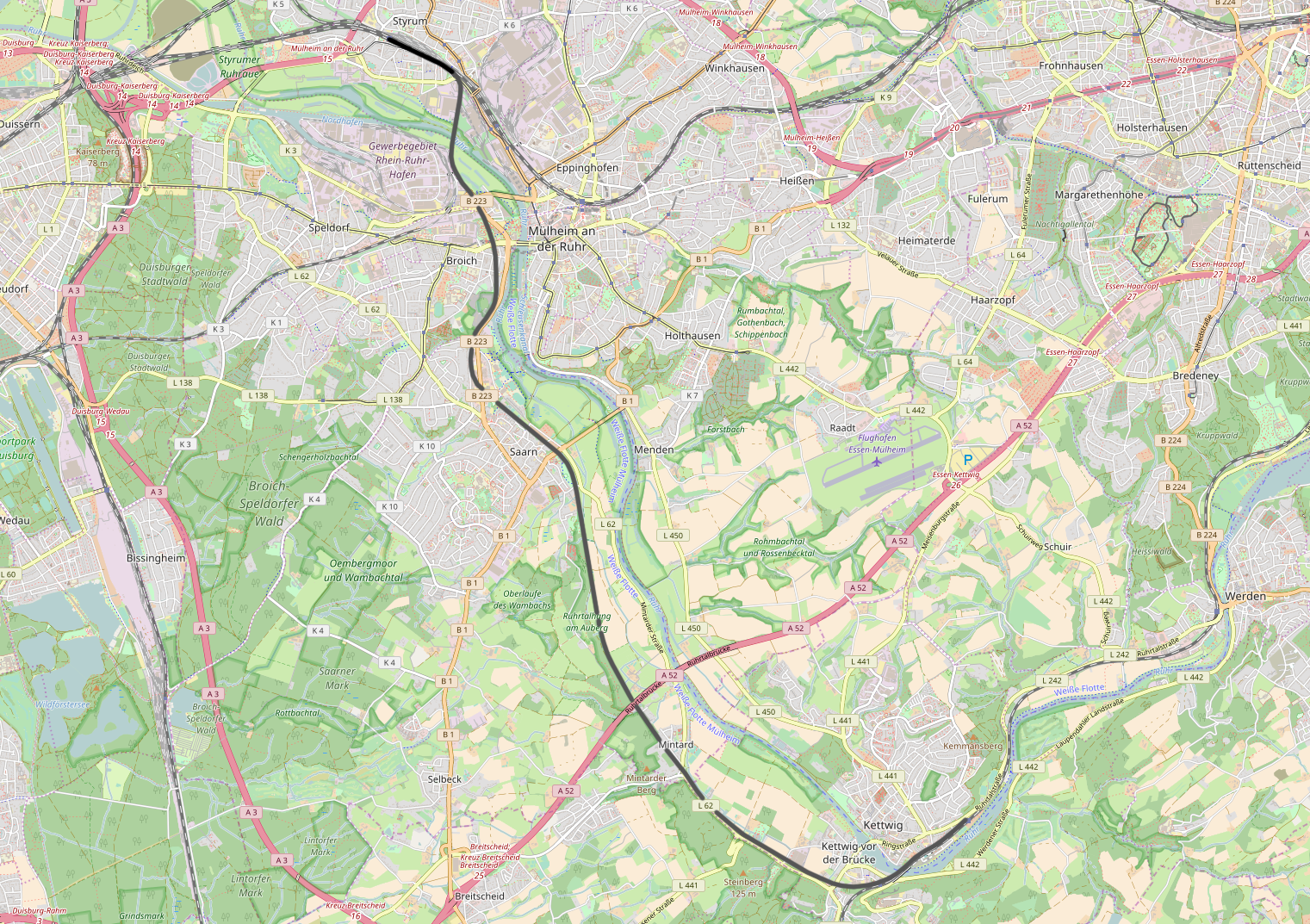

Overview
- Native name: Untere Ruhrtalbahn
- Line number: 2185 (Kettwig–Mülheim-Styrum); 85 (Ruhrbrücke junction–Mülheim West)
- Locale: North Rhine-Westphalia

Service
- Route number: Most recently: 231a

Technical
- Line length: 14.7 km (9.1 mi)
- Track gauge: 1,435 mm (4 ft 8 1/2 in) standard gauge
- Operating speed: 40 km/h (24.9 mph) (most recent maximum)

The Lower Ruhr Valley Railway (German: Untere Ruhrtalbahn) is a former railway in the German state of North Rhine-Westphalia. It was opened on 24 January 1876 by the Bergisch-Märkische Railway Company (Bergisch-Märkische Eisenbahn-Gesellschaft, BME) along the Ruhr to the southwest of the city of Mülheim an der Ruhr and connects Mülheim-Styrum on the Witten/Dortmund–Oberhausen/Duisburg railway and Essen-Kettwig on the Ruhr Valley Railway.

== Passenger services ==
The first passenger services in 1876 ran from Kettwig over the Kettwig railway bridge and the Ruhr bridge in Mülheim to the Mülheim station of the BME, which was later renamed as Mülheim (Ruhr) and is now Mülheim (Ruhr) West. The passenger service was moved in 1909 to Styrum because the connecting curve to Mülheim BME was upgraded for the expansion of Friedrich Wilhelms-Hütte steel works and Mülheim (Ruhr) West station was in the way. At the end of World War II, the two Ruhr bridges were destroyed. Consequently, passenger services from Mülheim had to stop short of the Ruhr bridge at Kettwig and later a station was built there called Kettwig Stausee ("Kettwig reservoir", below the current S-Bahn station of the same name) as a terminus. In Mülheim, the passenger service was diverted over the Broich connecting curve to Speldorf. After the re-establishment of the Mülheim bridge in 1954 both of the north-west end points (Styrum and Speldorf) were served until the abandonment of passenger services in 1968.

== History ==
- 24 January 1876: BME opened Kettwig–Styrum line
- 6 March 1876: freight traffic commenced between Kettwig and Styrum
- 15 March 1876: passenger services started between Kettwig Ruhrbrücke junction
- 1899: line duplicated between Kettwig and Broich
- 1909: line duplicated between Broich and Styrum
- 10 December 1909: passenger services started between Ruhrbrücke junction and Styrum
- 1945: Broich–Styrum bridge destroyed
- 10 April 1945: Kettwig–Kettwig Stausee bridge destroyed
- 1953: passenger service between Kettwig vor der Brücke and Kettwig Stausee restored
- 23 May 1954: single-track bridge restored for freight between Styrum and Broich
- 1 November 1955: Kettwig Reservoir Styrum converted from double-track main line in single-track branch line
- 1954/1955/1958: passenger service between Broich and Styrum was restored
- 26 May 1968: passenger service between Kettwig Stausee and Styrum abandoned
- 1 September 1968: freight operations between Kettwig Stausee and Saarn closed
- 10 October 1973: Broich–Styrum line closed
- 10 October 1973: Saarn–Broich line converted into a station track
- 1978: freight operations between Saarn and Broich closed
- 2 November 1981: Saarn–Broich line closed
- 3 February 1982: Saarn–Broich line dismantled.
- 1992: connecting line between Broich and Speldorf dismantled.
