= Björn Dirk Krapohl =

German surgeion (born 1965)

- Born: 26 January 1965 (age 61); Kettwig, Germany
- Known for: Hand surgery, breast surgery
- Scientific career
- Fields: Plastic surgery, breast surgery, hand surgery
- Workplaces: University of Lübeck, Charité; Medical University of Vienna; Medical University of Lusatia - Carl Thiem

Björn Dirk Krapohl (born 26 January 1965, Essen-Kettiwg, Germany) is a German surgeon, specializing in plastic surgery, hand surgery and international medical networking at the Medical University of Lusatia – Carl Thiem in Cottbus. He is also associated with the Charité in Berlin, the University of Lübeck and the Medical University of Vienna. He works in the fields of reconstructive microsurgery, hand surgery, breast surgery and participates in international activities in the field of global health.

== Education and career ==
Krapohl studied human medicine at the universities of Giessen, Aachen, Paris, London (Canada), Toronto (Canada), Philadelphia and Cologne. In 1995 he was promoted to doctor of medicine at the University of Cologne and also finished the United States Medical Licensing Examination (ECFMG licence), Philadelphia, Pennsylvania, U.S. He hold several positions until 2003 including medicine at The Cleveland Clinic Foundation in Cleveland, Ohio U.S. and at the Section of Telerobotics, Jet Propulsion Laboratory, NASA in Pasadena, California, U.S. He obtained his licensure for plastic surgery in 2003 and was habilitated in the discipline of plastic surgery at the University of Lübeck in the same year. He also obtained a venia docendi at the University of Vienna. In 2005 he obtained an additional title for hand surgery.

He was a guest lecturer at the Medical faculty of the Military Academy of Hanoi, Vietnam from 2010 to 2011 and a guest lecturer at the Medical High School of Tiflis in 2012. Krapohl was named head of the Section of Plastic Surgery at the Center of Musculoskeletal Surgery at the Charité, University Medicine, Berlin in 2014. In 2015 he became chief physician for plastic and aesthetic surgery, reconstructive microsurgery and hand surgery at the Marien-Hospital Berlin as well as consultant physician for reconstructive surgery and child surgery and also consultant surgery for breast reconstruction at the Charité. In 2018 he was recruited by the Carl-Thiem-Klinikum Cottbus (Germany) to establish Plastic Surgery at this hospital and to build up a Center for Reconstructive Surgery in affiliation with Department of Maxillofacial Surgery. In 2024, Carl-Thiem-Klinikum Cottbus became a publicly funded state medical university under the name Medical University of Lusatia (Medizinische Universität Lausitz)– Carl Thiem. Krapohl joined its faculty focussing his research and academic teaching on plastic surgery, global health, international medical networking, resilience conceptualization in medicine, and civil-military cooperation.

In 2019, Krapohl established a Nepali-German medical partnership program that gradually developed into a network encompassing serveral hospitals in Nepal. The partnership began with the Nepal Cleft and Burn Center at Kirtipur Hospital in Kathmandu. It subsequently expanded to include further Nepal hospitals: the National Trauma Center Kathmandu, the Medical University of Dhulikhel and the Bhaktapur Hospital.

The Nepali-German medical network focusses on Plastic Surgery, Hand Surgery, Burn Care Medicine, Oral-maxillofacial Surgery, Craniofacial Surgery, Neurosurgery and Emergency Medicine. Since 2020, the network has received funding from the German Federal Ministry for International Cooperation and Development and the Else-Koerner-Fresenius-Foundation (Else-Körner-Fresenius-Stiftung). It became an official program of Hospital Partnership Initiative which is implemented by the German Cooperation for International Cooperation (Gesellschaft für Internationale Zusammenarbeit, GIZ).

In 2025, Krapohl was invited to serve as ambassador for the Hospital Partnership Alliance. In 2026, Krapohl founded the Lausitz International Medical Network (LIM-Net), based at the Medical University of Lusatia – Carl Thiem in Cottbus, Lausitz, Germany. Ist founding members represented Nepal, Honduras, Argentina, Tanzania, Ghana, Kosovo, Austria, and Germany

== Scientific contribution ==
Since the beginning of his university career, Krapohl has focused on microsurgery of peripheral nerves and vessels. While working at the Cleveland Clinic Krapohl was involved in the development of animal models for transplantation of extremities and organs. Furthermore, he established animal models for microvascular thrombosis and thrombolysis. In 1997 the NASA Jet Propulsion Laboratory recruited Krapohl for the development of a prototype robot for microsurgical procedures in collaboration with the NASA engineers. Later on he continued his interest in microsurgery and especially in microsurgical replantation of extremities. When he began his work at the Military Hospital in Berlin he gradually focused on surgery of the breast. He proved that in military guards just the impact of the carbine to the chest while exercising can induce unilateral breast growth. Thereby he verified a new etiology of male gynecomastia due to mechanical stimulation. His findings were integrated into the guidelines of gynecomastia.

Following the beginning of his academic work at the Medical University of Lusatia – Carl Thiem, Krapohl expanded his research to encompass Global Health and International Medical Networking. In 2024, he became President of the German Society for Plastic and Reconstructive Surgery (Deutsche Gesellschaft für Plastische und Wiederherstellungschirurgie, DGPW) . He also served as Congress President of the first Joint Congress of the Nepali and the German Societies in Cottbus, Germany.

== Academic memberships ==
- Since 2004: German society of plastic, reconstructive and aesthetic surgeons
- Since 2004: Austrian society of hand surgery
- Since 2008: German Society for Plastic and Reconstruction Surgery, head of section of aesthetic surgery
- Since 2004: International Federation of Societies for Surgery of the Hand (IFSSH)
- Since 2011: German-speaking Working Group for Burn Care (DAV)
- Since 2026: Lausitz International Medical Network (LIM-Net, Founder, Chair)

== Honors and awards ==
- Price of the Ohio Valley Society for Plastic Surgeons, Indianapolis, USA (1997)

== Publications ==
- Gwinner, Clemens; Märdian, Sven; Schwabe, Philipp; Schaser, Klaus-D.; Krapohl, Björn Dirk; Jung, Tobias M. (2016). "Current concepts review: Fractures of the patella". GMS Interdisciplinary Plastic and Reconstructive Surgery DGPW. 5: Doc01. doi:10.3205/iprs000080. ISSN 2193-8091. PMC 4717300. PMID 26816667.
- Schanz, Stefan; Schreiber, Gerhard; Zitzmann, Michael; Krapohl, Björn Dirk; Horch, Raymund; Köhn, Frank-Michael (April 2017). "S1-Leitlinie: Gynäkomastie im Erwachsenenalter". Journal der Deutschen Dermatologischen Gesellschaft. 15 (4): 465–472. doi:10.1111/ddg.13080_g. ISSN 1610-0387. PMID 28378481. S2CID 45049174.
- Kwiatkowska, Katarzyna; Krapohl, Björn Dirk; Tanzella, Ursula; Ueberreiter, Klaus (2019). "Long-term clinical results and quality of life in patients undergoing autologous fat transplantation for breast augmentation using the BEAULI™ protocol". GMS Interdisciplinary Plastic and Reconstructive Surgery DGPW. 8: Doc10. doi:10.3205/iprs000136. ISSN 2193-8091. PMC 6545491. PMID 31275800.
- Eder, Christian; Scheller, Ariane; Schwab, Nina; Krapohl, Björn Dirk (2019). "Four-corner arthrodesis of the wrist using Variable Angle Locking Compression Intercarpal Fusion Plate (VA LCP ICF Plate; Synthes®): pre- and postoperative radiological analysis and clinical outcome in long-term evaluation". GMS Interdisciplinary Plastic and Reconstructive Surgery DGPW. 8: Doc15. doi:10.3205/iprs000141. ISSN 2193-8091. PMC 6883383. PMID 31815084.
- Schanz, Stefan; Schreiber, Gerhard; Zitzmann, Michael; Krapohl, Björn Dirk; Horch, Raymund; Köhn, Frank-Michael (April 2017). "S1 guidelines: Gynecomastia in adults". Journal of the German Society of Dermatology. 15 (4): 465–472. doi:10.1111/ddg.13080. ISSN 1610-0387. PMID 28378479. S2CID 43392607.
