= Unterrath =

City district of Düsseldorf, Germany

Coordinates: 51°16′25″N 6°47′26″E

Map of Düsseldorf, showing Unterrath (in red) within Borough 6 (in pink)

Unterrath (German pronunciation: [ˈʊntɐʁaːt]) is one of the 50 quarters of the City of Düsseldorf, Germany. Located in the north of the city, it is part of Borough 6. It is near Düsseldorf Airport.

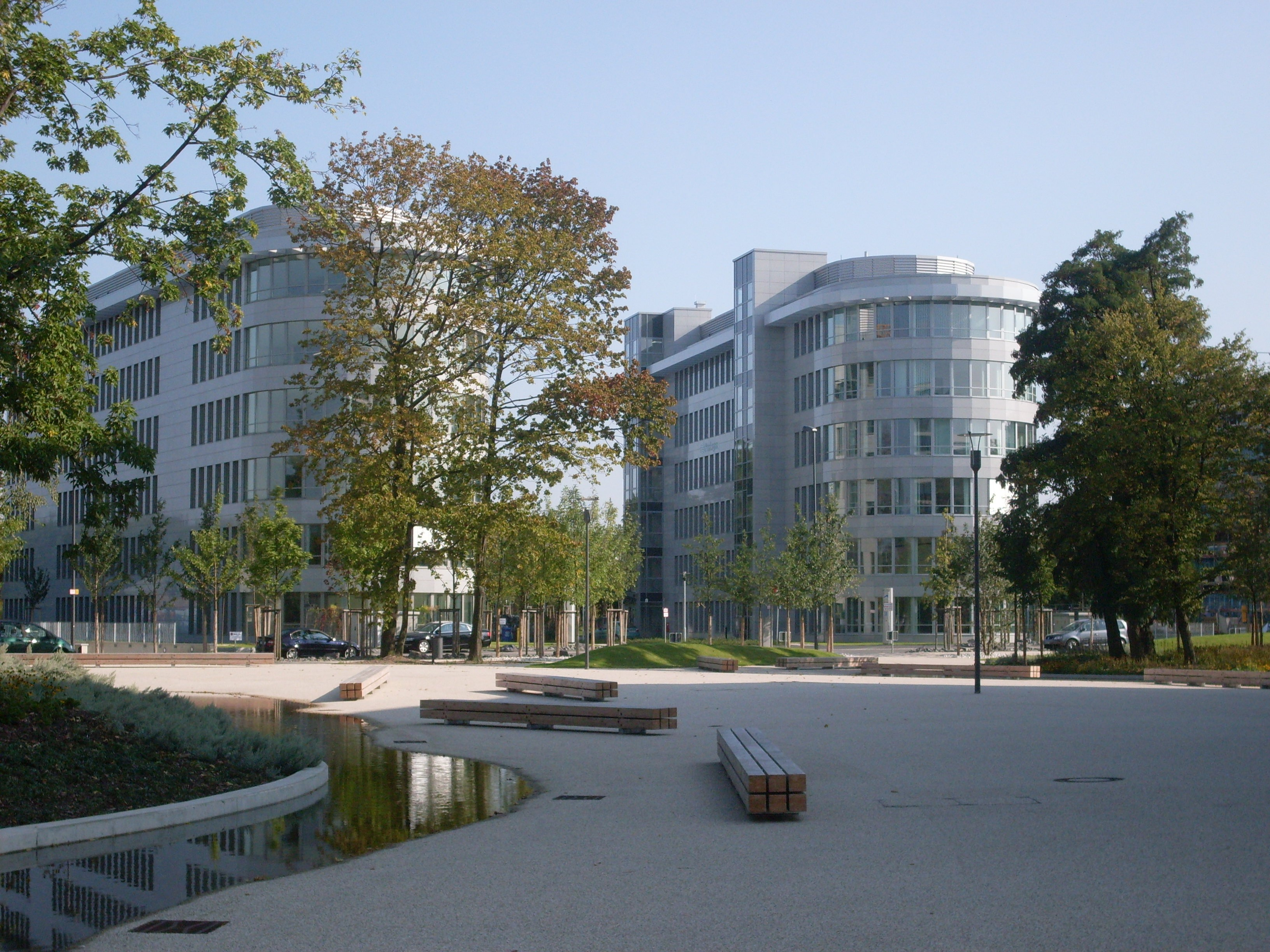
Airport City

== Geography ==
It is bordering on Düsseldorf-Lohausen, Lichtenbroich, Rath, Mörsenbroich, Derendorf und Stockum. Unterrath has an area of 4.43 km^{2} (1.71 sq mi), and 22,002 inhabitants (2020).

== Name and History ==
The royal court of the honschaft Rath was in Unterrath. In 1869, the Carthusians founded their first German convent in Unterrath. By its own wish, Unterrath became a part of Düsseldorf in 1909, together with Rath and Lichtenbroich.

Unterrath is mainly a housing area. Daimler automotive company has factories in Unterrath.

== See also ==
- Düsseldorf-Unterrath station
