= Mülheim-Styrum station =

Railway station in Mülheim an der Ruhr, Germany

Mülheim (Ruhr) Styrum
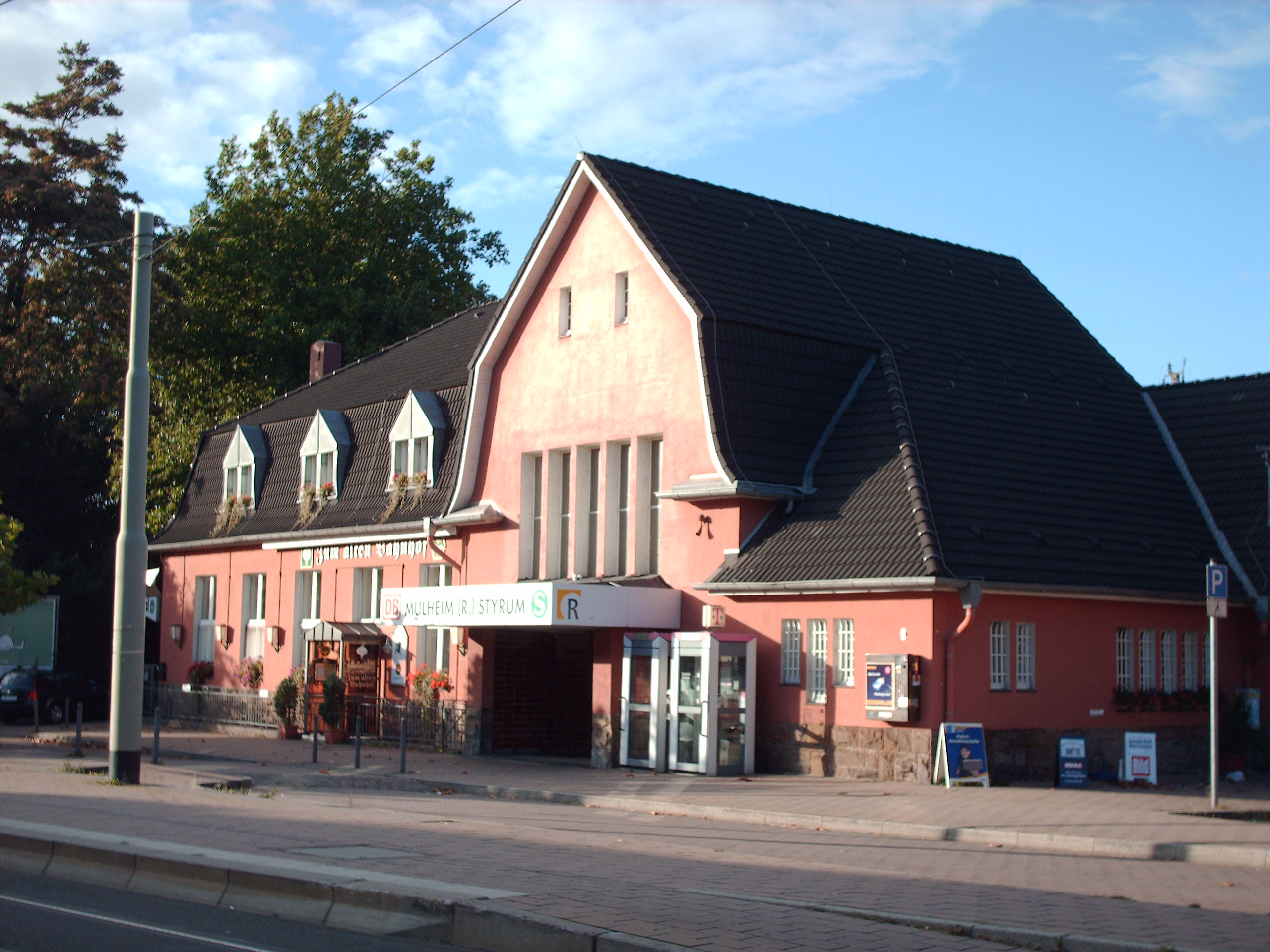

General information
- Location: Styrum, NRW; Germany
- Coordinates: 51°26′57″N 6°51′09″E
- Owner: Deutsche Bahn
- Operator: DB Netz; DB Station&Service
- Lines: Dortmund–Duisburg (KBS 450.1); formerly Lower Ruhr Valley
- Platforms: 5
- Train operators: DB Regio NRW

Construction
- Accessible: Yes (except platform 1)

Other information
- Station code: 4221
- DS100 code: EMRY
- Category: 3
- Fare zone: VRR: 340
- Website: www.bahnhof.de

History
- Opened: 1880

Services
Preceding station	DB Regio NRW	Following station
Oberhausen Hbf towards Wesel	RE 49	Mülheim (Ruhr) Hbf towards Wuppertal Hbf
Duisburg Hbf towards Aachen Hbf	RB 33	Mülheim (Ruhr) Hbf towards Essen-Steele
Preceding station	Rhine-Ruhr S-Bahn	Following station
Duisburg Hbf towards Solingen Hbf	S1	Mülheim (Ruhr) Hbf towards Dortmund Hbf
Oberhausen Hbf Terminus	S3	Mülheim (Ruhr) West towards Hattingen (Ruhr) Mitte
Location

Mülheim-Styrum station is located in the district of Styrum in the German city of Mülheim in the German state of North Rhine-Westphalia. It is on the Witten/Dortmund–Oberhausen/Duisburg line and is classified by Deutsche Bahn as a category 3 station.

== Location and layout ==
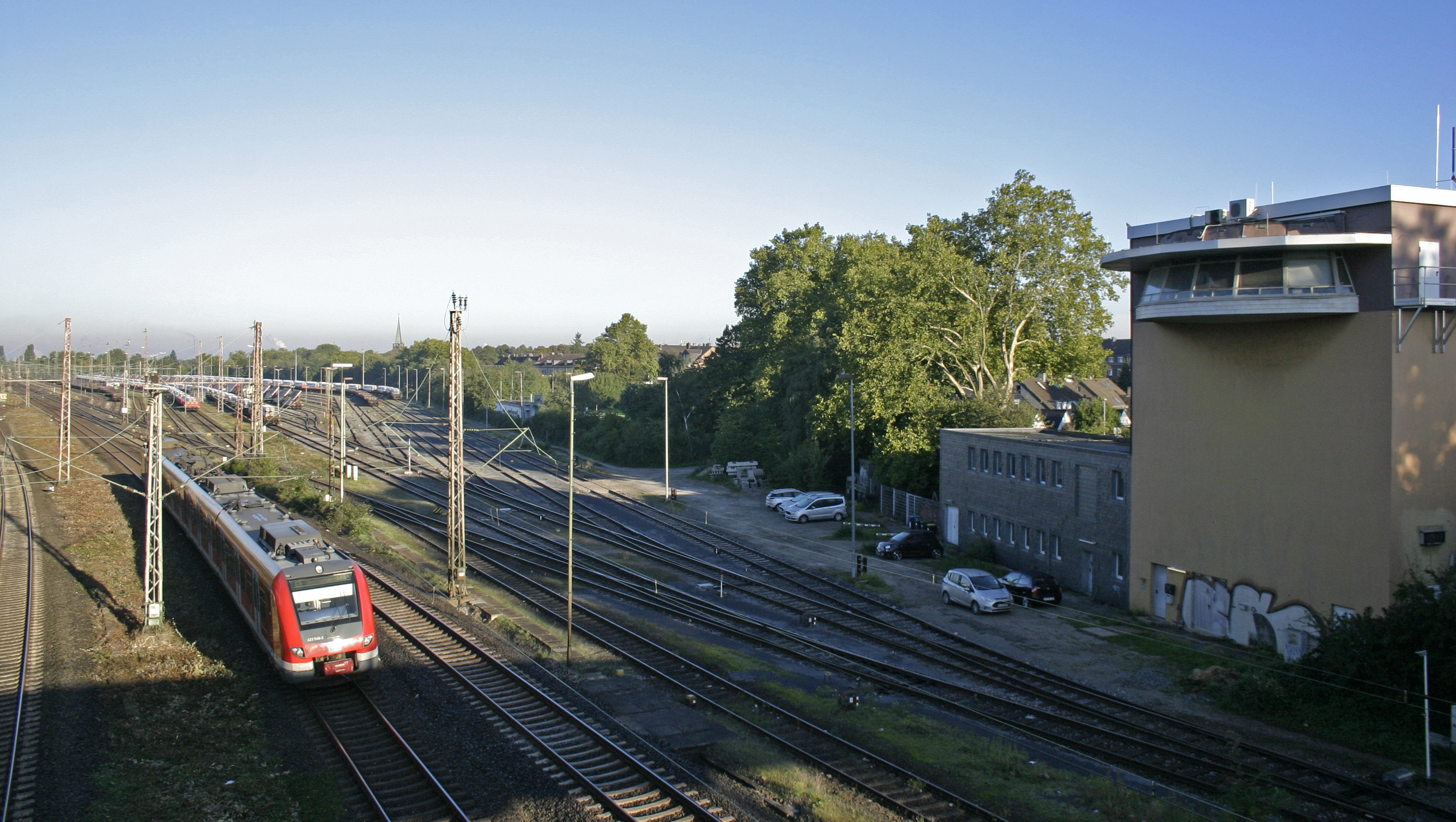
Overview of the track layout of Mülheim-Styrum station in 2015. On the left are the passenger tracks, on the right the freight tracks and the connecting tracks to the Mannesmann site. Signal box "Mf" is on the right

The station is served by passenger and freight traffic. The track system comprises a total of five platform tracks. S-Bahn trains to and from Duisburg use tracks 2 and 5, the trains to and from Oberhausen use tracks 3 and 4 on the two island platforms. The house platform (platform 1) and track 6 (which has no platform) are used for long-distance and regional trains. Sidings 8–18 are to the north of this (although track 12 is vacant).

In the station there are two track connections to the Mannesmann tube factory and to the Friedrich Wilhelms steel works.

The station has been controlled from the Mülheim-Styrum signal box since 1967. In addition to Styrum station, it also controls Mülheim (Ruhr) West station, Mülheim Hauptbahnhof and the subsequent sections of open line. The signal box controls a relay interlocking of the SpDrS59 class, the remotely controlled interlocking at Mülheim Hauptbahnhof is of the SpDrS60 class. The open line to Essen is equipped with an automatic block signaling interlocking of class Sbk60. The signal box was put out of operation until 21 March 2016 by a fire in the control room in the early morning of 4 October 2015.

== History ==
Styrum station was built on the Bergisch-Markisch Railway Company (Bergisch-Märkische Eisenbahn-Gesellschaft; BME) line from Ruhrort to Essen, which was opened in 1862. In addition to this, the connection curves from Oberhausen and Duisburg joined the line in the Styrum area. The connection from Kettwig, opened in 1876, provided another BME line connecting to the south. The latter line was initially used from Styrum only by freight traffic, but passenger trains ran directly to Mülheim station (mow Mülheim (Ruhr) West).

When Styrum was incorporated into Mülheim an der Ruhr, the station was renamed to Mülheim (Ruhr)-Styrum. A new entrance building was opened in 1910 and after that passenger trains from Kettwig ran to Styrum.

== Services ==
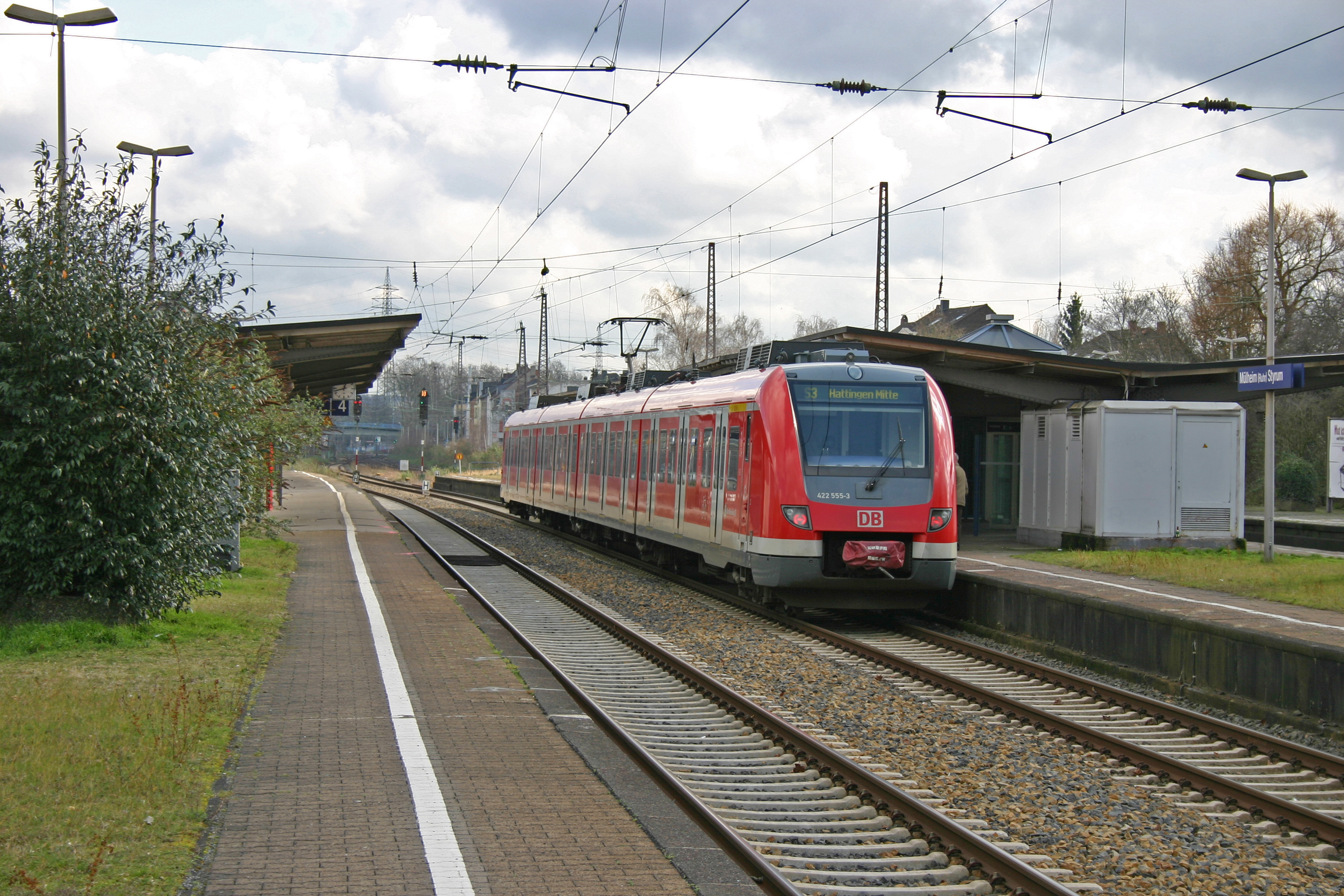
422 055 running as S3 to Hattingen (Ruhr) Mitte in Mülheim (Ruhr)-Styrum, 2014

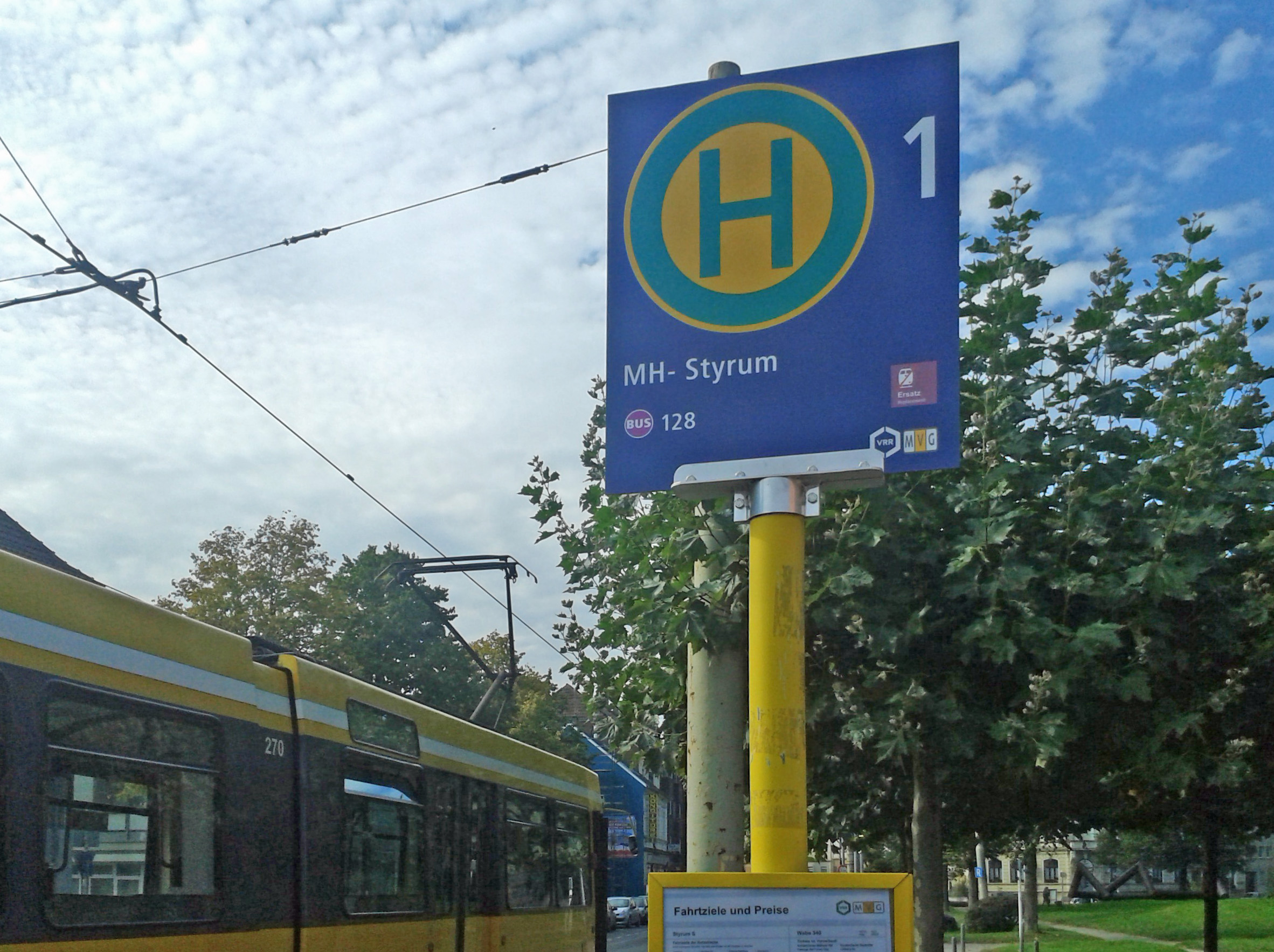
A tram stops at the station on the last day of operation in 2015

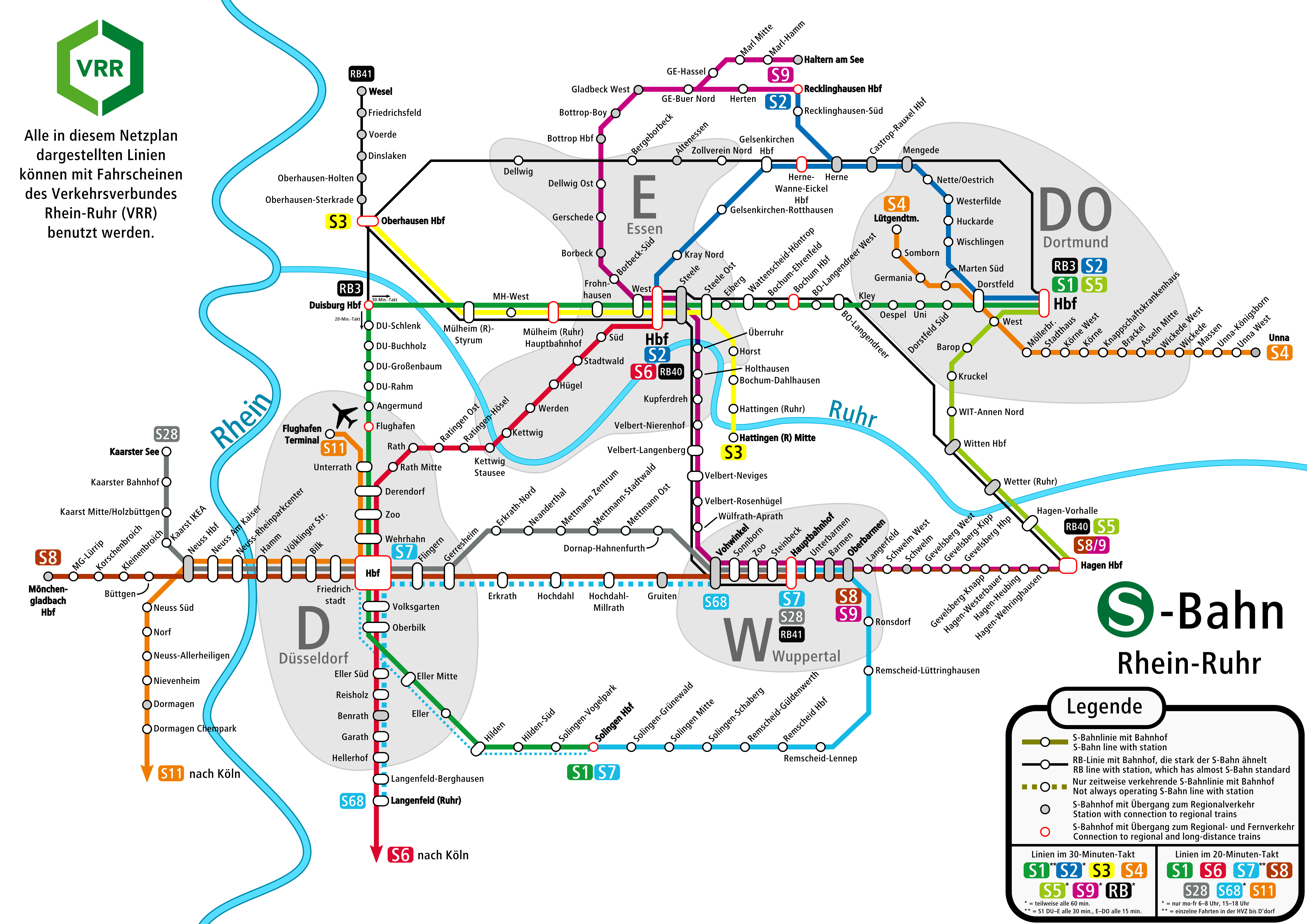
2019 network plan

Mülheim (Ruhr)-Styrum station is only served by regional trains and Rhine-Ruhr S-Bahn trains. It is served by S-Bahn lines S1 and S3, providing direct connections to Düsseldorf, Duisburg, Oberhausen, Essen, Bochum and Dortmund. Lines RB 33 (Rhein-Niers-Bahn) and RE 49 (Wupper-Lippe-Express) provide connections to Aachen, Krefeld, Mönchengladbach, Wesel and Wuppertal. Until 1995, there was also a shuttle service operated with class 515 battery-powered cars to Duisburg-Ruhrort. The trains of the Lower Ruhr Valley Railway (Untere Ruhrtalbahn) ran from Kettwig to Styrum until 1968. The terminal track for the Kettwig trains and the reversing track for the battery powered railcars (located between tracks 3 and 4) no longer exist since the two services have been terminated.

Mülheim (Ruhr)-Styrum station is served by the following lines:

Line	Route	Frequency
RE 49; Wupper-Lippe-Express	Wesel – Oberhausen – Mülheim-Styrum – Mülheim – Essen – Wuppertal-Vohwinkel – Wuppertal	60 mins
RB 33; Rhein-Niers-Bahn	Essen – Mülheim – Mülheim-Styrum – Duisburg – Krefeld – Mönchengladbach – Aachen	60 mins
S1	Dortmund – Bochum – Essen – Mülheim – Mülheim-Styrum – Duisburg – Düsseldorf Airport – Düsseldorf – Hilden – Solingen	30 min
S3	Oberhausen – Mülheim-Styrum – Mülheim – Essen – Hattingen (Ruhr) Mitte	30 min

It is served by three bus routes, 122, 128 and 129, operated by Ruhrbahn. Until 2015, it was also served by a tram line.

In freight transport, the handling of metal products, such as steel coil and steel plate, is particularly important.
