= Borough 6 (Düsseldorf) =

Stadtbezirk 6
- Borough of Düsseldorf
- Location of Stadtbezirk 6 within Düsseldorf
- Interactive map of Stadtbezirk 6
- Location within Germany Location within North Rhine-Westphalia
- Coordinates: 51°15′58″N 6°48′51″E
- Country: Germany
- State: North Rhine-Westphalia
- District: Urban district
- City: Düsseldorf
- Subdivisions: 4 quarters

Area
  - Total: 19.63 km^{2} (7.58 sq mi)

Population (2020-12-31)
  - Total: 66,610
  - Density: 3,393/km^{2} (8,789/sq mi)
- Time zone: UTC+01:00 (CET)
  - Summer (DST): UTC+02:00 (CEST)

Borough 6 (German: Stadtbezirk 6) is a northern borough of Düsseldorf, the state capital of North Rhine-Westphalia, Germany. The borough covers an area of 19.63 square kilometres and (as of December 2020) has about 67,000 inhabitants. The borough borders with the Düsseldorf boroughs 1, 2, 5 and 7. To the Northeast the borough borders with the rural district of Mettmann.

== Subdivisions ==
Borough 6 is made up of four Stadtteile (city parts):

#	City part	Population (2020)	Area (km²)	Pop. per km²
061	Lichtenbroich	6,104	2.14	2,879
062	Unterrath	22,002	4.43	4,955
063	Rath	20,483	10.42	1,958
064	Mörsenbroich	18,021	2.64	6,800

== See also ==
- Boroughs of Düsseldorf
