= Mülheim (Ruhr) West station =

Railway station in Mülheim an der Ruhr, Germany

Mülheim (Ruhr) West
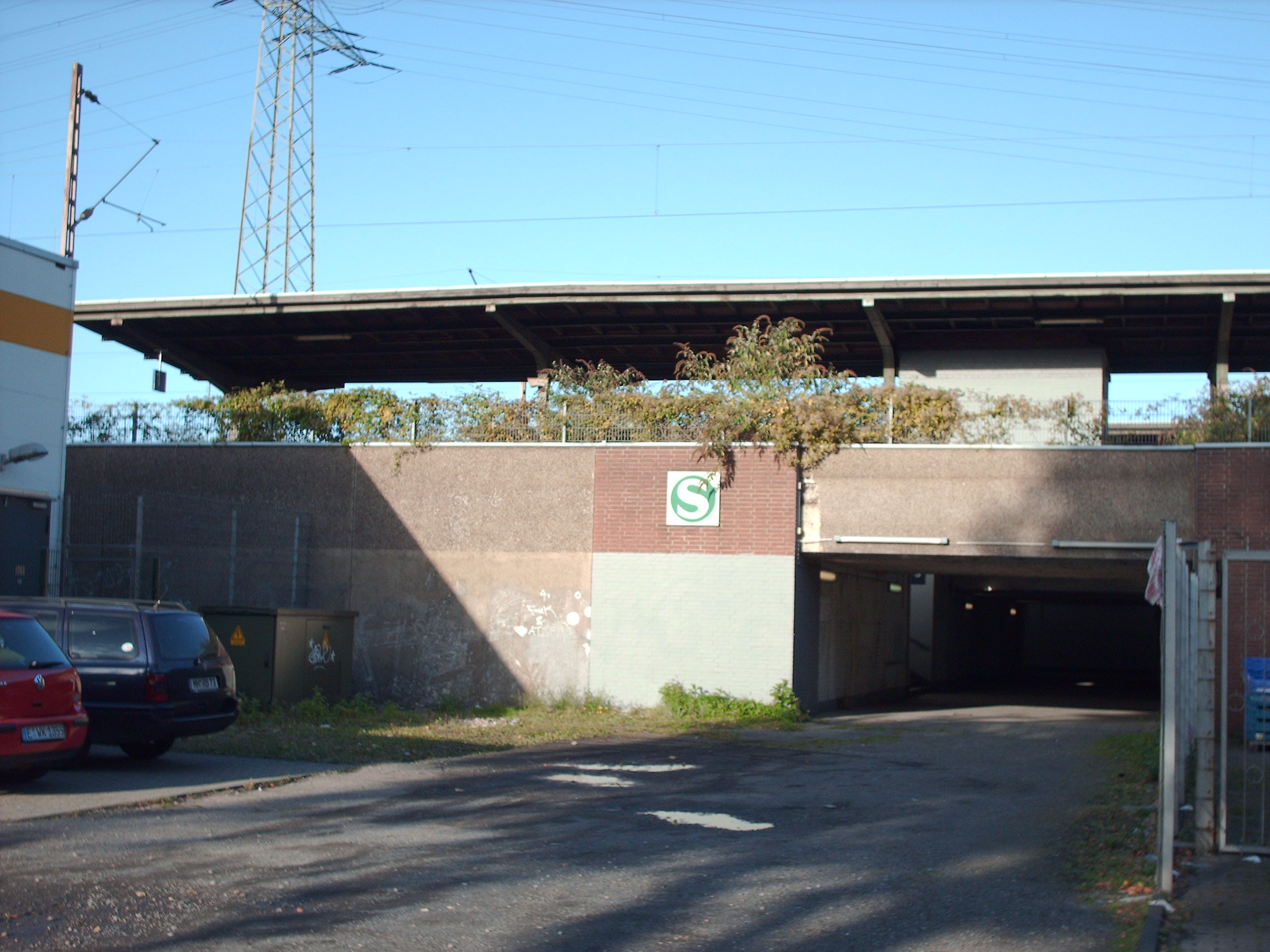

General information
- Location: Friedrich-Ebert-Str. 210, Essen, NRW; Germany
- Coordinates: 51°26′23″N 6°52′16″E
- Owner: DB Netz
- Operator: DB Station&Service
- Lines: Dortmund–Duisburg (KBS 450.3)
- Platforms: 1
- Train operators: DB Regio NRW

Construction
- Accessible: No

Other information
- Station code: 4220
- DS100 code: EMRW
- IBNR: 8004122
- Category: 5
- Fare zone: VRR: 340
- Website: www.bahnhof.de

History
- Opened: 1 March 1862

Services
Preceding station	Rhine-Ruhr S-Bahn	Following station
Mülheim-Styrum towards Oberhausen Hbf	S3	Mülheim towards Hattingen (Ruhr) Mitte
Location
- Location within North Rhine-Westphalia

Mülheim (Ruhr) West station is located in the German city of Mülheim in the German state of North Rhine-Westphalia. It is on the Witten/Dortmund–Oberhausen/Duisburg line and is classified by Deutsche Bahn as a category 5 station.

The station was opened 1 March 1862 by the Bergisch-Märkische Railway Company and was called Mülheim (BM) station until 1892, when it was renamed Mülheim (Ruhr). Although it was larger than the station now known as Mülheim (Ruhr) Hauptbahnhof, it was not accepted as the town's main station, because it was too far from its central area. On 26 May 1974, it was renamed to its current name.

It is served by Rhine-Ruhr S-Bahn line S 3 every 30 minutes, tram line 112 (every 10 minutes) operated by Stadtwerke Oberhausen and Ruhrbahn, and bus line 130 (every 20 minutes) operated by Ruhrbahn. The former tram line 110 was replaced by bus 128 on 4 October 2015.
