= Mörsenbroich =

City district of Düsseldorf, Germany

Coordinates: 51°15′19″N 6°48′29″E

Map of Düsseldorf, showing Mörsenbroich (in red) within Borough 6 (in pink)

Mörsenbroich (German pronunciation: [mœʁzn̩ˈbʁoːx]) is an urban quarter of Düsseldorf, part of Borough 6. It borders on Unterrath, Rath, Derendorf, Grafenberg and Düsselthal. It has an area of 2.64 km^{2} (1.02 sq mi), and 18,021 inhabitants (2020).

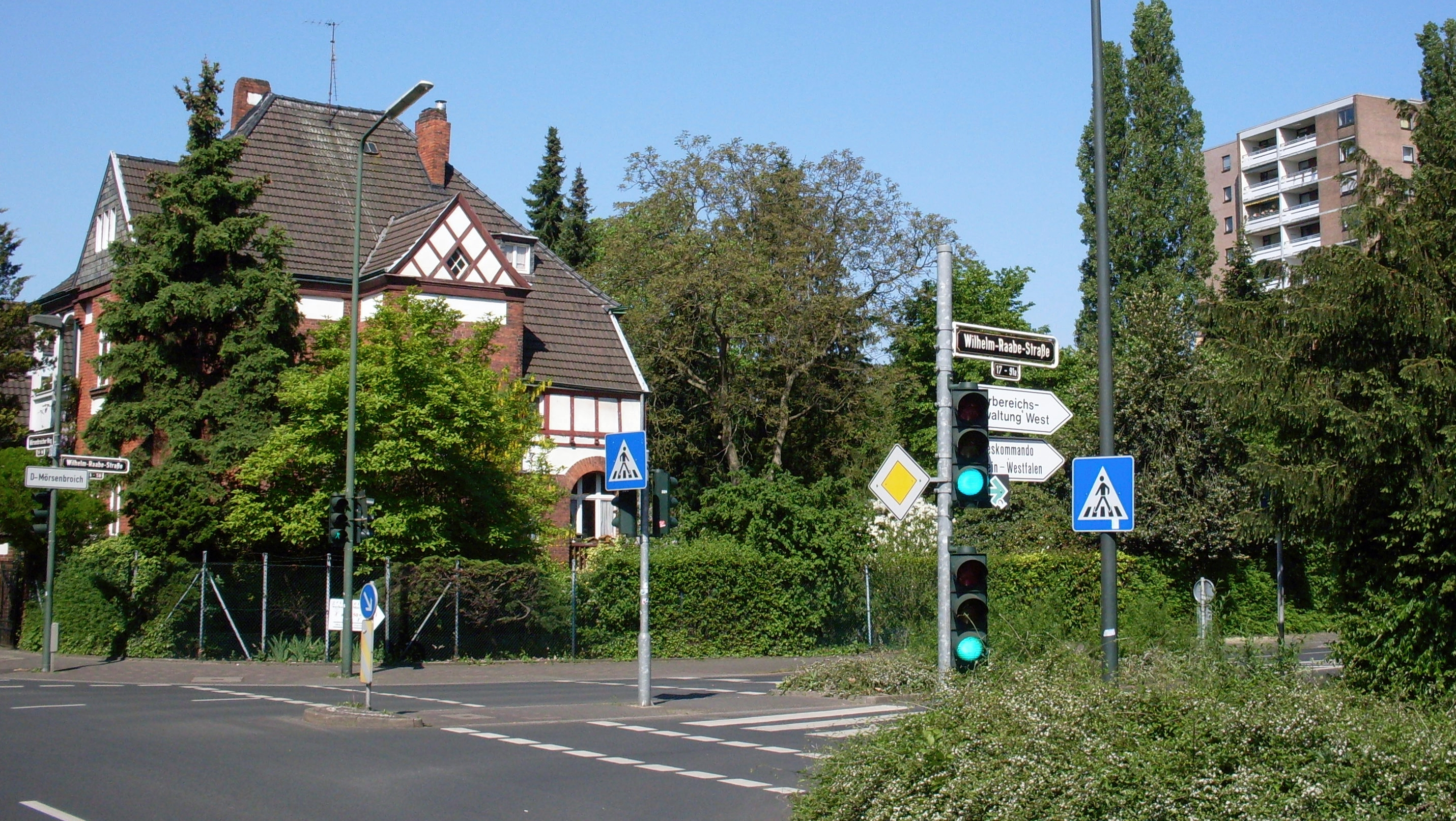

In the region around Düsseldorf is the "Mörsenbroicher Ei" ("Mörsenbroich egg") well-known, because there is large traffic-jam every morning. The Mörsenbroich egg is a place where the federal highway A 52 ends and the traffic goes into the city of Düsseldorf. It crosses the federal road B 7, and two main roads of Düsseldorf, one of them is the ring road going along outside the central district of Düsseldorf.
