= Kettwig station =

Railway station in Essen, Germany

Kettwig
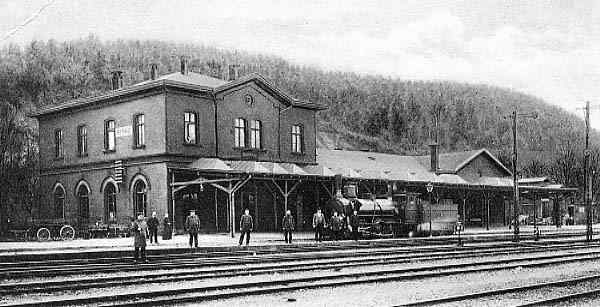
- Kettwig station, 1905

General information
- Location: Ruhrtalstraße 345; 45219 Essen; Kettwig, Essen, NRW; Germany
- Coordinates: 51°21′48″N 6°57′13″E
- Lines: Ruhr Valley Railway; Lower Ruhr Valley Railway (closed)
- Platforms: 3

Construction
- Accessible: Yes

Other information
- Station code: 3166
- DS100 code: EKG
- Category: 5
- Fare zone: VRR: 450
- Website: www.bahnhof.de

History
- Opened: 1 February 1872

Key dates
- 1968/1974: S-Bahn service started

Services
Preceding station	Rhine-Ruhr S-Bahn	Following station
Kettwig Stausee towards Köln-Nippes	S6	Essen-Werden towards Essen Hbf
Location

Kettwig is a railway station in the city of Essen in western Germany on the Ruhr Valley Railway.

== History ==
A first station at Kettwig was opened in 1871 by the Bergisch-Märkische Eisenbahn and passenger service on the line Düsseldorf-Kettwig-Kupferdreh was started on 1 February 1872. A proper station hall and ticket office was commissioned in 1873 and erected in 1875, the old station building was sold to Wermelskirchen. During 1873, another single-track railway line to Mülheim an der Ruhr was also built.

The BME was integrated into the state railways of Prussia in 1882, and in 1887 a second track was built between Kettwig and Werden. In 1905, Kettwig was upgraded to a 1st class station, with express trains like the Essen to Basel service calling at the station. A passenger tunnel to access the second platform was also constructed.

In 1926, after a construction time of over 13 years, a railway line to Velbert via Heiligenhaus was connected to the station, crossing the Ruhr on a third bridge.

In March 1945 the Ruhr bridges at Kettwig were destroyed by the German army. Services to Mülheim and Velbert were ran from Kettwig Stausee railway station instead, and only a single bridge connecting the line to Düsseldorf was ever constructed after World War II.

Kettwig depot was closed in 1953 by Deutsche Bundesbahn.

In 1968, the Düsseldorf-Kettwig-Essen railway line was fully electrified, and on 22 May 1968 the first line of the Rhein-Ruhr S-Bahn started serving Kettwig. The S-Bahn line was renamed to S6 in 1974.

Services at the station were substantially cut by 1 November 1977, when the station lost its autonomy due to the merger of Kettwig with the city of Essen. The ticket hall and station hall were closed, and the station was downgraded to a dependent outpost of Essen Hauptbahnhof.

The former ticket hall building was sold to the city of Essen in 2001 and is now used as a cultural centre and restaurant.

The station today is regularly served by Rhein-Ruhr S-Bahn trains on the S6 line.
