= Lichtenbroich =

Düsseldorf-Lichtenbroich
- Stadtteil of Düsseldorf
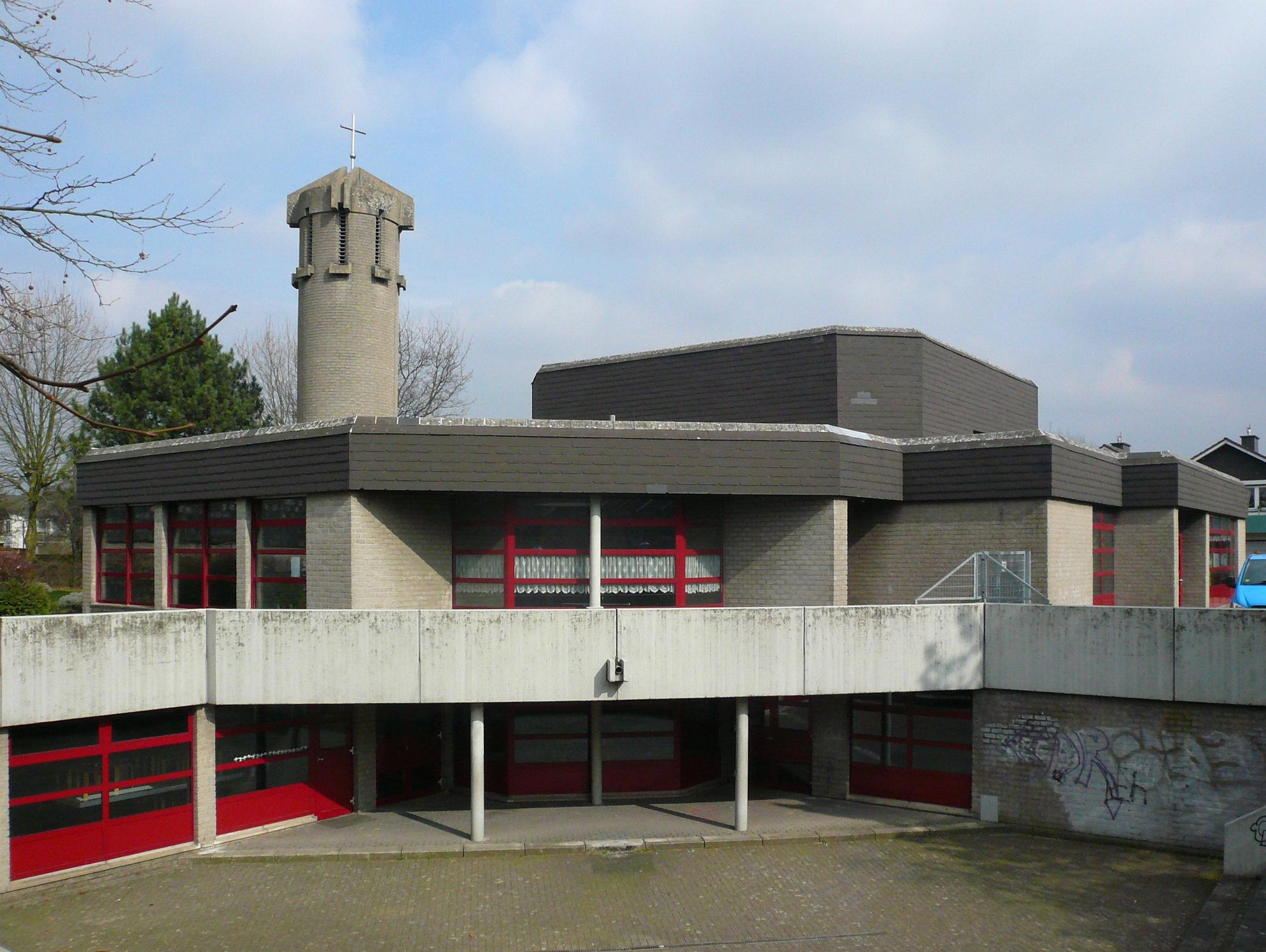
- Mathias Church

- Map of Düsseldorf, showing Lichtenbroich (in red) within Borough 6 (in pink)
- Interactive map of Düsseldorf-Lichtenbroich
- Location within Germany Location within North Rhine-Westphalia
- Coordinates: 51°16′N 6°47′E
- Country: Germany
- State: North Rhine-Westphalia
- District: Urban district
- City: Düsseldorf
- Borough: Borough 6

Area
  - Total: 2.14 km^{2} (0.83 sq mi)

Population (2020-12-31)
  - Total: 6,104
  - Density: 2,850/km^{2} (7,390/sq mi)
- Time zone: UTC+01:00 (CET)
  - Summer (DST): UTC+02:00 (CEST)

Lichtenbroich (German pronunciation: [lɪçtn̩ˈbʁoːx]) is an urban quarter of Düsseldorf, part of Borough 6. It is in the north of the city, neighbouring to Lohausen, Mörsenbroich and the airport. It has an area of 2.14 km^{2} (0.83 sq mi), and 6,104 inhabitants (2020).

The area Lichtenbroich was written mentioned first time in 1193. It belonged to the Knights of Kelcheim. Lichtenbroich was a swampy area, flooded often by the river Rhine. Until the beginning of the 20th century, there were no industrialisation, nearly no infrastructure and nearly no inhabitants in Lichtenbroich.

After the World War II many people, who were driven out of Silesia, Pomerania and Eastern Prussia found their new home in Lichtenbroich. So it has developed to a densely populated area. The Mannesmann Company built a tube factory in Lichtenbroich and the German Mail (public administration in that time) constructed a settlement for their employees in Lichtenbroich.

Today there are mainly mobile phone companies, airlines from the neighboring airport, rent-a-car-services and fashion companies (the Düsseldorf Exhibition Center is near to Lichtenbroich, too).

The new ice hockey stadion of Düsseldorf is in Lichtenbroich.

At 28 November 2024 There was an explosion in Lichtenbroich weg, at around 5:15.
