= Kettwig =

Borough of the city of Essen, Germany

Coordinates: 51.36288°N 6.94024°E

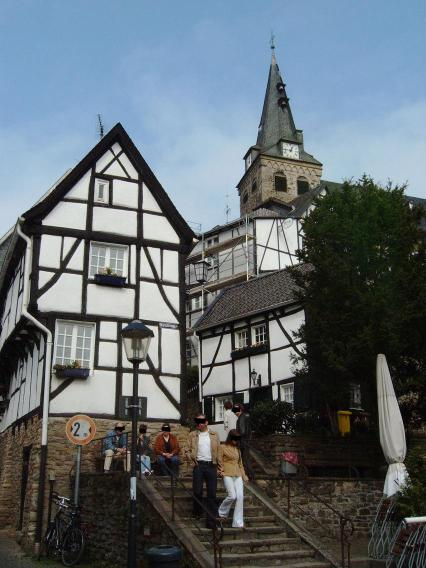
Old town

Kettwig (German pronunciation: [ˈkɛtvɪç]) is the southernmost borough of the city of Essen in western Germany and, until 1975, was a town in its own right. Kettwig is situated next to the Ruhr river, at a median height of 53 metres above sea level. It is the most recently incorporated borough of Essen and also the largest in area, at 15.3 km². It belongs to the city district Stadtbezirk IX Werden/Kettwig/Bredeney and has 17,760 inhabitants as of June 2006.

== History ==
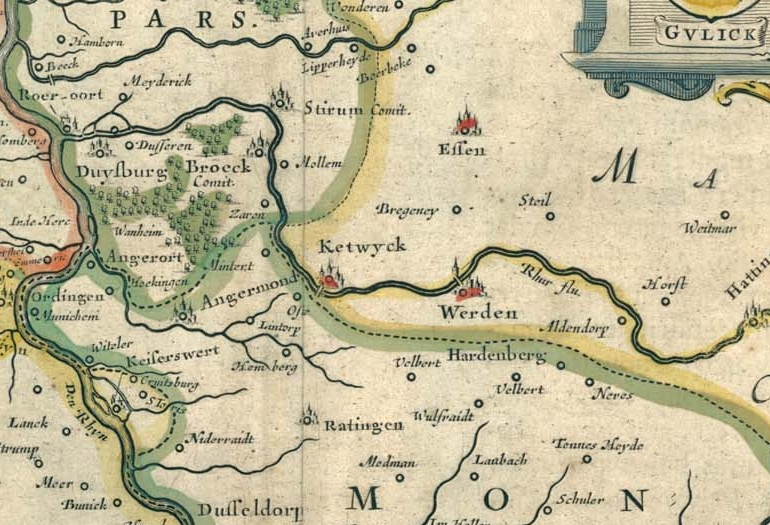
Map of Kettwig, 1640

Kettwig's first mention was in a letter of Pope Innocent III to Heribert II of Werden dated May 19, 1199.

A bridge over the Ruhr was first mentioned in 1282 and heavily fought for during the Thirty Years War. The northern parts of the Kettwig parish belonged to the abbey of Werden until 1802, then fell to Prussia from 1802 to 1806. From 1806 to 1814, Kettwig belonged to the earldom of Berg, then was under Prussian administration again until 1929.

Kettwig gained town rights in 1857 and first belonged to the district of Duisburg, then to the district of Essen. In 1929, when the district of Essen was dissolved, Kettwig fell to the district Düsseldorf-Mettmann.

The part of Kettwig south of the Ruhr, Kettwig vor der Brücke, belonged to the earldom of Berg until 1814, then fell to the district of Düsseldorf until May 15, 1930 when it was merged with Kettwig. Oefte was merged from Heiligenhaus into Kettwig in April 1936.

On January 1, 1975, the district reform in the state of North Rhine-Westphalia became effective and Kettwig was separated from the Düsseldorf-Mettmann district (which was renamed to Mettmann), and merged into the city of Essen. The westernmost part of Kettwig, Mintard, merged into Mülheim an der Ruhr. In 1996, a public quorum demanded Kettwig to be split off the city of Essen and to be merged back into the district of Mettmann, however, the state government decided not to change the status quo.

== Sights ==
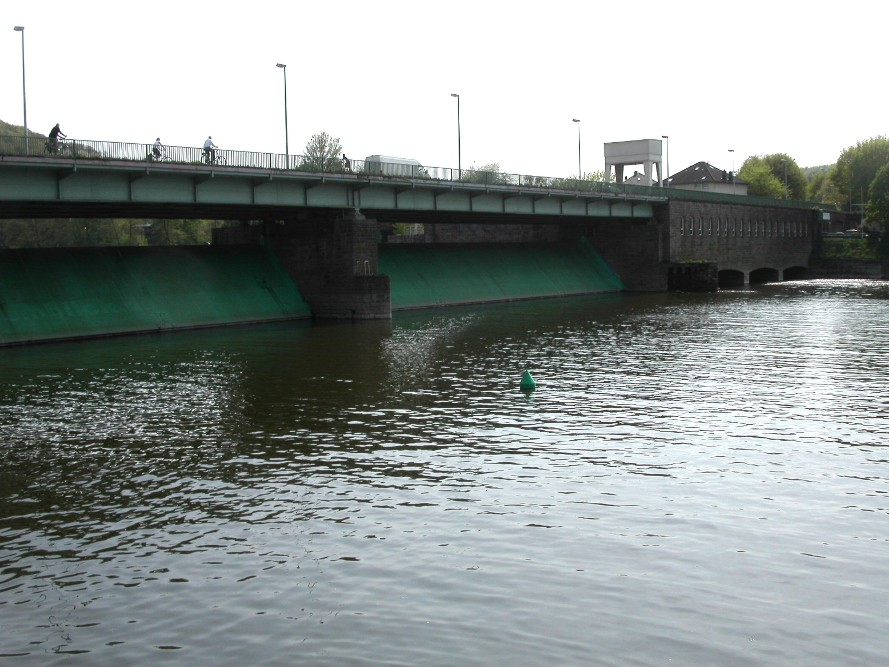
Kettwig reservoir

Thanks to not having any important major industries, Kettwig emerged from World War II largely unscathed and with most of its medieval old town still intact. The tower of the Market Church dates back to the 14th century, with additions from 1720. The Catholic Church St. Peter was christened in 1830. Other sights include Schloss Hugenpoet, which has been remodeled into a hotel, Schloss Oefte, and the Kattenturm, a 14th-century watchtower belonging to the former castle Luttelnau.

The Kettwig reservoir was built by the Ruhrverband between 1940 and 1950. It is the smallest of the five Ruhr reservoirs. It holds up to 1.42 million m³ of water and powers a hydroelectric power plant with a maximum output of 5.3 MW, built for and operated by RWE.

== List of mayors ==
- 1813 - 1819 : Franz Arnold Alexander Freiherr von dem Bottlenberg gen. von Schirp
- 1819 - 1843 : Theodor Märcker
- 1843 - 1844 : Heinrich von Rosenthal
- 1844 - 1858 : Johann Wilhelm Kron
- 1859 - 1871 : Carl Zoensch
- 1871 - 1877 : Emil Phalke
- 1877 - 1884 : Carl Haverkamp
- 1885 - 1902 : Karl Eduard Göring
- 1902 - 1905 : Friedrich Bleek
- 1906 - 1910 : Alexander Bleymüller
- 1910 - 1914 : Wilhelm Thiemann
- 1917 - 1931 : Andreas Hopmann
- 1931 - 1933 : Friedrich Ulrich
- 1933 - 1940 : Wilhelm Klemm
- 1940 : Hans Karl Wernicke
- 1940 - 1941 : Friedrich Wilhelm Hermann Messerschmidt
- 1942 - 1943 : Hans Karl Wernicke
- 1943 - 1945 : Fritz Dietzel
- 1946 - 1949 : Lambert Soesters
- 1949 - 1952 : Heinrich Berns
- 1952 - 1953 : Peter Stürznickel
- 1953 - 1954 : Heinrich Körner
- 1954 - 1960 : Wilhelm Kemper
- 1960 - 1961 : Albert Fiedler
- 1961 - 1964 : Georg Schriever
- 1964 - 1974 : Albert Fiedler

== Transport ==
Kettwig is situated near the Bundesautobahn 52 motorway, which connects the borough to other parts of Essen and to Düsseldorf as well as to the national autobahn grid. There are two railway stops on Kettwig territory, both are served by the S6 line of the Rhine-Ruhr S-Bahn since May 1968. Kettwig railway station is situated on the northern side of the Ruhr and dates back to the 1870s, whilst Kettwig Stausee railway station opened in 1945 after the destruction of the rail bridges over the Ruhr, serving Kettwig vor der Brücke. The latter used to connect to lines leading to Mülheim an der Ruhr and Velbert, but these have been closed in the 1960s.

Local bus lines within Essen and Mülheim an der Ruhr as well as in between the two cities are operated by Ruhrbahn. Bus line 151 connects Kettwig to Mülheim on the right hand river side via the Kettwig swimming pool and Mülheim-Menden and line 134 connects Kettwig to Mülheim on the left hand river side via Mülheim-Mintard and Mülheim-Saarn. The Rheinbahn now operates the former Bahnbus lines to Velbert and Heiligenhaus.

== Trivia ==
Due to being integrated into Essen relatively recently, there are a few quirks associated with Kettwig:

- The telephone dialling code is 02054, despite the rest of Essen having the 0201 code.
- The railway stations have not been prefixed with Essen-, as has been the case with all other stations in Essen.
- Kettwig belongs to the diocese of Cologne, which results in the Ruhr diocese not profiting from Kettwig church taxes.
- The Protestant population (about 58%) likewise belongs to the church parish of Mülheim an der Ruhr.
