= Bergisch-Markisch Railway Company =

German transport company

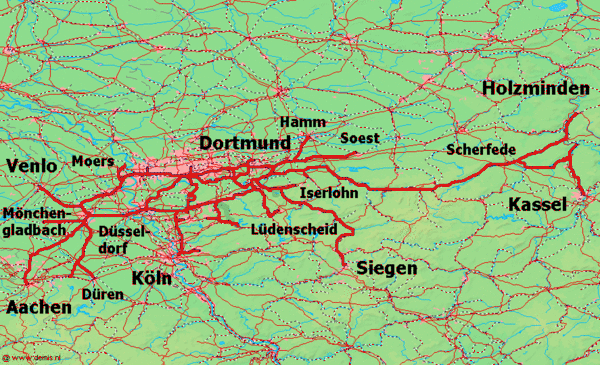
Network of the Bergisch-Markisch Railway Company shortly before its nationalisation in 1882

The Bergisch-Markisch Railway Company (German: Bergisch-Märkische Eisenbahn-Gesellschaft, BME), also referred to as the Berg-Mark Railway Company or, more rarely, as the Bergisch-Markische Railway Company, was a German railway company that together with the Cologne-Minden Railway (Cöln-Mindener Eisenbahn-Gesellschaft, CME) and the Rhenish Railway Company (Rheinische Eisenbahn-Gesellschaft, RhE) was one of the three (nominally) private railway companies that in the mid-19th century built the first railways in the Ruhr and large parts of today's North Rhine-Westphalia. Its name refers to Bergisches Land and the County of Mark.

== History ==
=== Foundation ===
The Bergisch-Markisch Railway Company was founded on 18 October 1843 in Elberfeld (today a city district of Wuppertal). Since the Cologne-Minden Railway Company had decided to build its route via Duisburg rather than through the valley of the Wupper river, the Bergisch-Markisch Railway Company (German: Bergisch-Märkische Eisenbahn-Gesellschaft, BME) determined to build its own line through the Wupper valley, to create a link between the highly industrialised area of the Bergisches Land with the east, particularly to connect with the Märkische coal fields, near Dortmund. The required concession for the railway was Granted by the Prussian government on 12 July 1844. A link to the Rhine in the west had already been completed in 1841 by the Düsseldorf-Elberfeld Railway Company, which had been founded in 1837.

=== Trunk routes ===
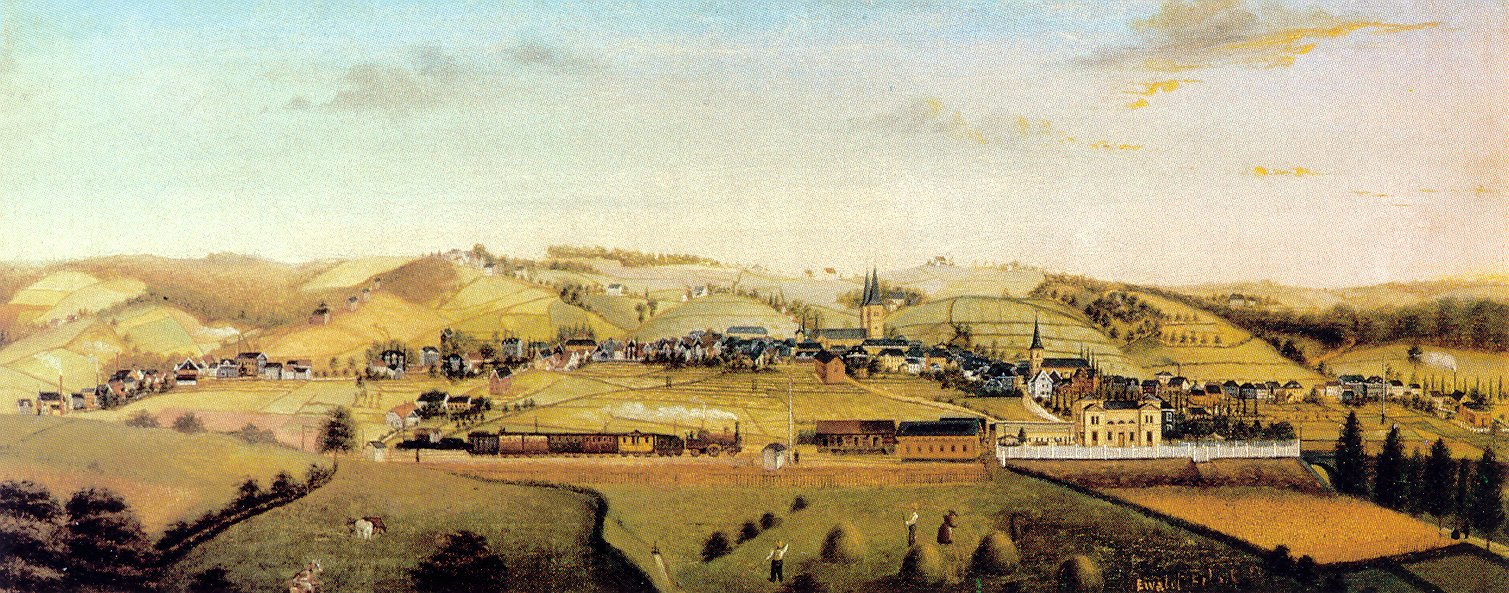
Line at Schwelm in 1861

Its original, 56 km long main line ran from Elberfeld to Dortmund via Barmen (since 1929 part of Wuppertal), Schwelm, Hagen, Wetter and Witten and was completed in 1849. In the following years the company built other main and branch lines in the Ruhr along the Hellweg an ancient highway and the Ruhr and Rhine rivers. In 1862 it opened a profitable east-west trunk line between Dortmund and Witten through Bochum-Langendreer, Essen, Mülheim an der Ruhr to Duisburg. The development of the Ruhr valley was largely a result of the opening of the BME’s trunk line.

The company’s development was characterised by the acquisitions of many smaller railway companies to round out its network. However, its energetic board of directors and its chairman Daniel von der Heydt (1802–1874, later a member of the Prussian House of Lords), despite years of effort, were not able to take over the Prussian government-owned Royal Westphalian Railway Company. Such a takeover would have allowed the BME to develop a connection via Hamm to a German seaport via Rheine.

=== Expansion ===
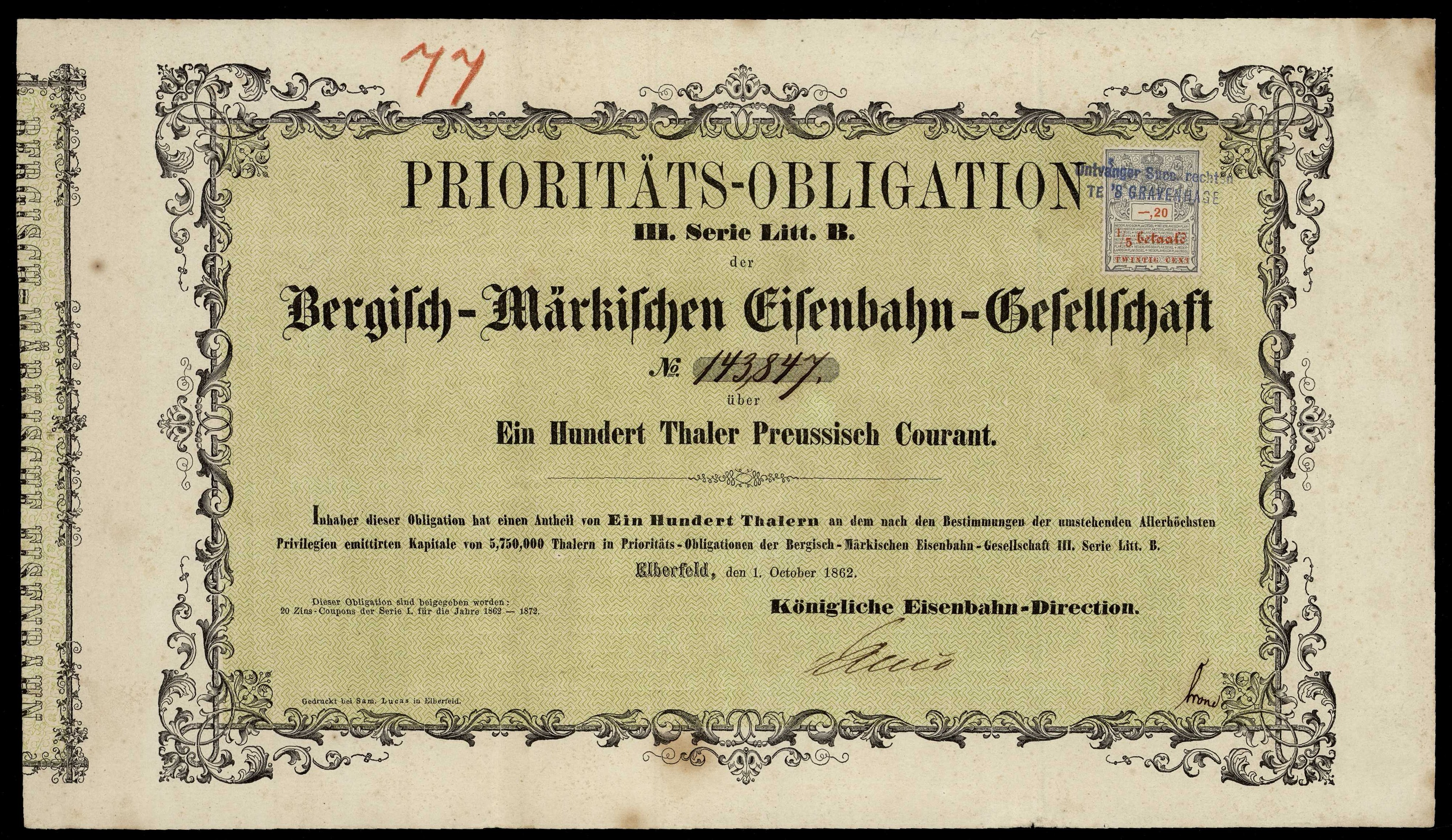
Obligation of the Bergisch-Märkischen Eisenbahn-Gesellschaft, issued 1 October 1862.

Major expansion began in 1859 with the construction of the 106 km long Ruhr–Sieg from Hagen to Siegen and its mines. The line opened on 6 August 1861 and cost 12.9 million thalers. In 1858 it started to build its Witten–Duisburg trunk line through the Ruhr. The first section was opened between Duisburg and Hochfeld for freight trains only on 19 August 1859. The 52 km line from Bochum-Langendreer to Steele, Essen and Mülheim an der Ruhr, with connections to various coal mines, was completed on 1 May 1862. At Steele it also connected with the northern end of the Steele–Vohwinkel railway, which had been rebuilt in 1847 from the Prince William Railway (opened as the first horse-powered railway in Germany in 1831) and acquired by the BME in 1854 for 1.3 million thalers.

Logically, then its next step in 1866 was to cross the Rhine via the Ruhrort–Homberg train ferry with the goal of connecting with Belgium and Netherlands through the purchase of the Aachen-Düsseldorf-Ruhrort Railway Company's lines for seven million thalers. In 1870, it completed the Hamm railway bridge across the Rhine in Düsseldorf-Hamm and opened the line from Dusseldorf to Neuss. This created a second connection between its networks on the east and west banks of the Rhine.

In addition the construction of several smaller routes followed up to 1876, an extension in an easterly direction, the Upper Ruhr Valley Railway to Arnsberg, Bestwig, Brilon-Wald and Warburg and Holzminden on the Weser river. Here it connected with the line to Kassel of the Frederick William Northern Railway Company, which it took over on 17 April 1868, with its 130-kilometer line from Gerstungen via Bebra and Kassel to Bad Karlshafen for eight million thalers. After 1870 the network was extended on the west bank of the Rhine with the 66 km long line from Rheydt-Odenkirchen to Aue and Düren. During the nationalisation of the company in 1880 the company took over the 78 km railway network of the Dutch-Westphalian Railway Company from Gelsenkirchen-Bismarck to Dorsten, Borken to Winterswijk in the Netherlands, with a branch from Borken to Bocholt.

=== Opening and acquisition of lines ===
Dates	Lines	Route
1847–1849	Elberfeld–Dortmund	Trunkline: Elberfeld–Oberbarmen–Schwelm–Milspe-Hagen–Witten–Dortmund
1855	Dortmund–Soest	Dortmund–Hörde–Unna–Soest
1857	Düsseldorf–Elberfeld	acquisition of the Dusseldorf-Elberfeld Railway Company
1859–1861	Ruhr–Sieg	Hagen–Letmathe–Finnentrop–Kreuztal–Siegen
1859–1862	Witten/Dortmund–Oberhausen/Duisburg	Witten/Dortmund–Langendreer–Essen–Mülheim (Ruhr)–Mülheim-Styrum–Oberhausen/Duisburg
1863	Wuppertal-Vohwinkel–Essen-Überruhr	acquisition of the Prince William Railway Company
1864	Aachen–Mönchengladbach	acquisition of the Aachen-Düsseldorf Railway
1864	Mönchengladbach–Düsseldorf	acquisition of the Aachen-Düsseldorf Railway
1864	Duisburg-Ruhrort–Mönchengladbach	acquisition of the Aachen-Düsseldorf Railway
1866	Viersen–Venlo	Viersen–Kaldenkirchen–Venlo
1866/7	Hagen–Hamm	Unna–Hamm (1866), Hagen–Herdecke (1867)
1867/8	Gruiten–Köln-Deutz	(Elberfeld–)Gruiten–Solingen–Opladen–Köln-Deutz(–Cologne)
1868	Friedrich-Wilhelms Northern Railway	acquisition of the Friedrich-Wilhelms Northern Railway Company
1868-81	Wuppertal-Oberbarmen–Opladen/Remscheid	Oberbarmen–Lennep–Remscheid (1868), Lennep–Wermelskirchen (1876), Wermelskirchen–Opladen (1881)
1870	Hamm railway bridge	Neuss–Düsseldorf
1870–73	Schwerte–Warburg	Schwerte–Arnsberg (1870) Arnsberg–Meschede (1871) Meschede–Bestwig (1872) Bestwig–Warburg (1873)
1872	Düsseldorf–Schwerte	Düsseldorf–(Essen-)Kettwig–(Essen-)Kupferdreh–Herdecke–Schwerte
1873	Hochneukirch–Stolberg	Rheydt-Odenkirchen–Jülich–Düren, Jülich–Weisweiler–Aue
1876	Mülheim-Styrum–Essen-Kettwig	(Mülheim-)Styrum–(Essen-)Kettwig
1876	Scherfede–Holzminden	Scherfede–Beverungen–Holzminden
1877	Essen-Werden–Essen	(Essen-)Werden–Essen
1879	Iron Rhine	Rheydt–Dalheim–D/NL border at Vlodrop
1880	Gelsenkirchen-Bismarck–Winterswijk	acquisition of Dutch-Westphalian Railway Company

== Nationalisation ==
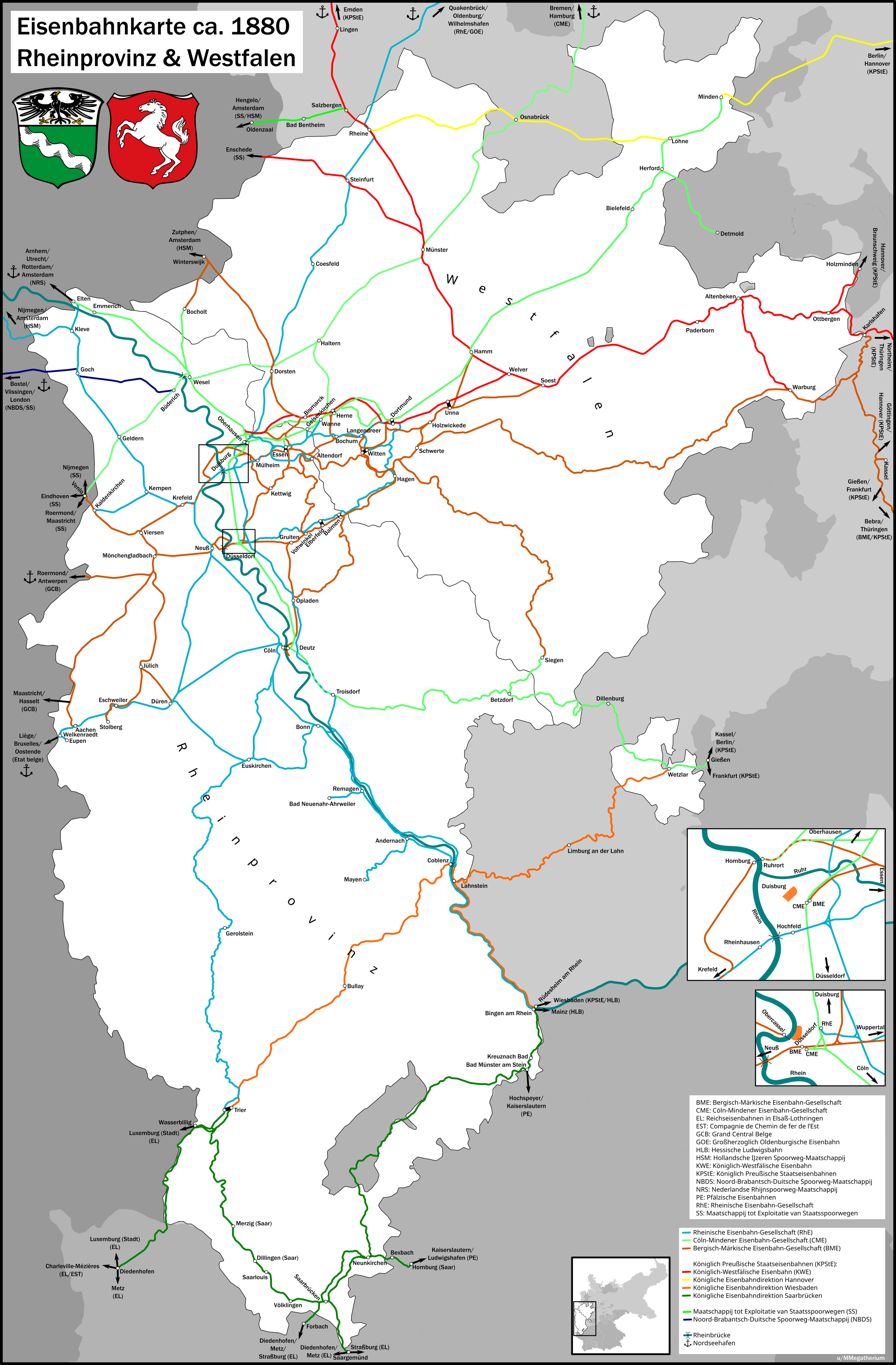
Railway map of the Rhein Province and Westfalen (ca. 1880), shortly before nationalisation

The act for the nationalisation of the Bergisch-Markisch Railway Company was promulgated on 28 March 1882. At that time, the Prussian government held 64 percent of the share capital of the Company. The Prussian state railways's Royal directorate of railways at Elberfeld (German: Königliche Eisenbahn-Direction zu Elberfeld) took over its management with effect from 1 January 1882.

At its nationalisation the company had 768 locomotives and 21,607 wagons. Its rail network was 1,336 km long, including 720 km of double track railway. The purchase price was financed by government bonds worth 633,847,500 marks. The company was dissolved on 1 January 1886.
