= Ruhr Valley Railway =

Railway line running from Düsseldorf-Rath to Warburg

Coordinates: 51.4011°N 7.1694°E

Düsseldorf–Hagen railway
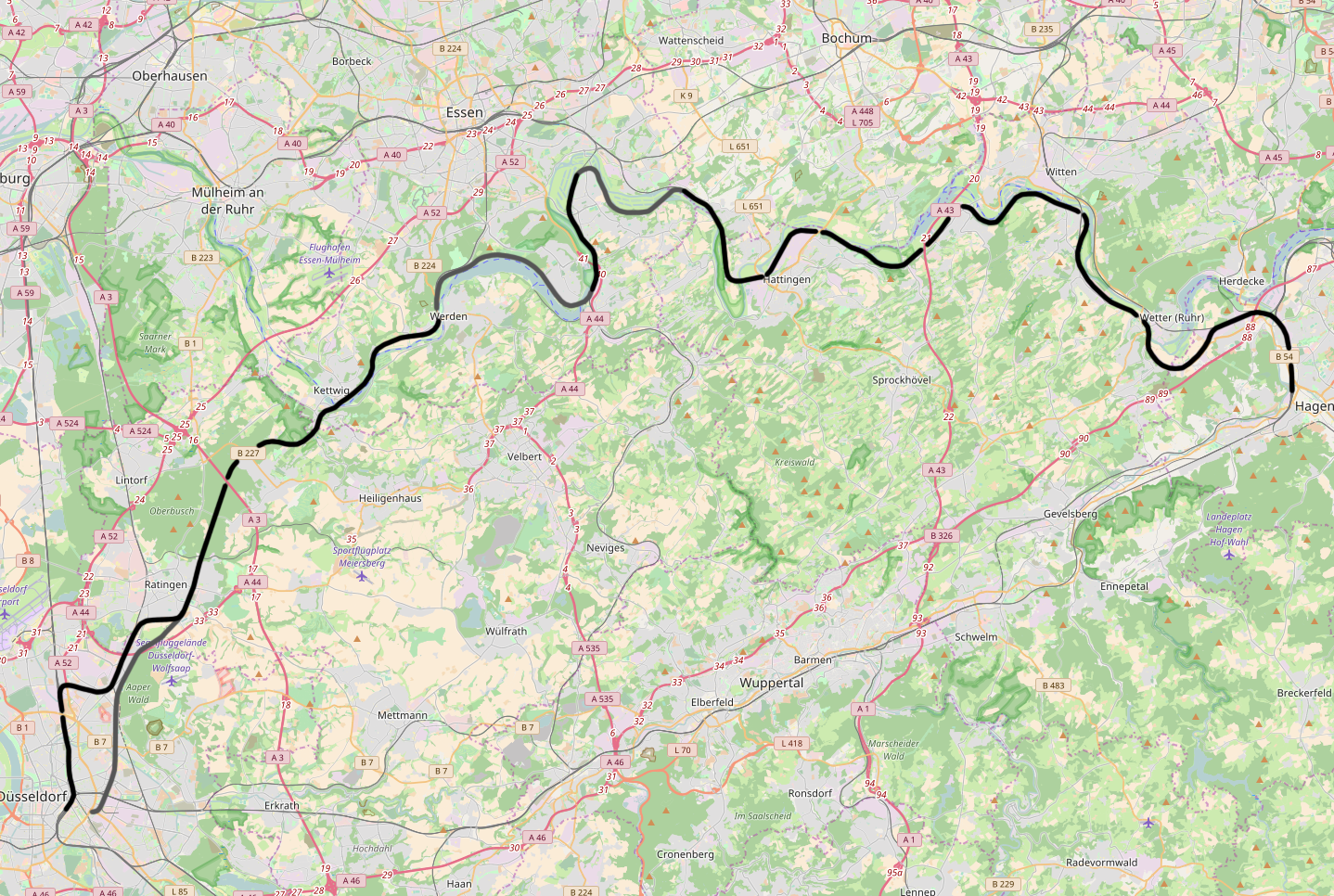

Overview
- Line number: 2400
- Locale: North Rhine-Westphalia

Service
- Route number: 450.1, 450.3, 450.6; 450.7, 450.9, 450.11

Technical
- Line length: 80 km (50 mi)
- Number of tracks: 2: Düsseldorf Hbf – Essen-Werden; 2: Essen-Kupferdreh – Essen-Überruhr; 2: Bochum-Dahlhausen – Hattingen; 2: Wengern Ost – Hagen Hbf
- Track gauge: 1,435 mm (4 ft 8 1/2 in) standard gauge
- Electrification: 15 kV/16.7 Hz AC overhead catenary
- Operating speed: 120 km/h (74.6 mph) (maximum)

The Ruhr Valley Railway (German: Ruhrtalbahn) is a partly abandoned railway line in the German state of North Rhine-Westphalia, running from Düsseldorf-Rath via Old Kupferdreh station, Bochum-Dahlhausen, Witten-Herbede, Hagen-Vorhalle and Schwerte to Warburg. It was built between 1872 and 1876 by the Bergisch-Märkische Railway Company (Bergisch-Märkischen Eisenbahn-Gesellschaft), one of the three major private railway companies in the Ruhr area. The railway tracks that were built along the Ruhr river had a relatively uniform grade that was suitable for railway operations at the time.

The Ruhr Valley line primarily served the transport of coal to the port of Ruhrort, bypassing the Heißen hills. In the heyday of coal mining in the Ruhr, sidings provided a high volume of coal traffic and the line also served the, now closed, Henrichshütte steel works in Hattingen.

In addition to the Ruhr Valley line, which at its western end from Kettwig to Düsseldorf does not run along the Ruhr River, there was also the Lower Ruhr Valley Railway, which ran from Kettwig along the Ruhr to Styrum, but was closed in 1978 and later demolished.

== History ==
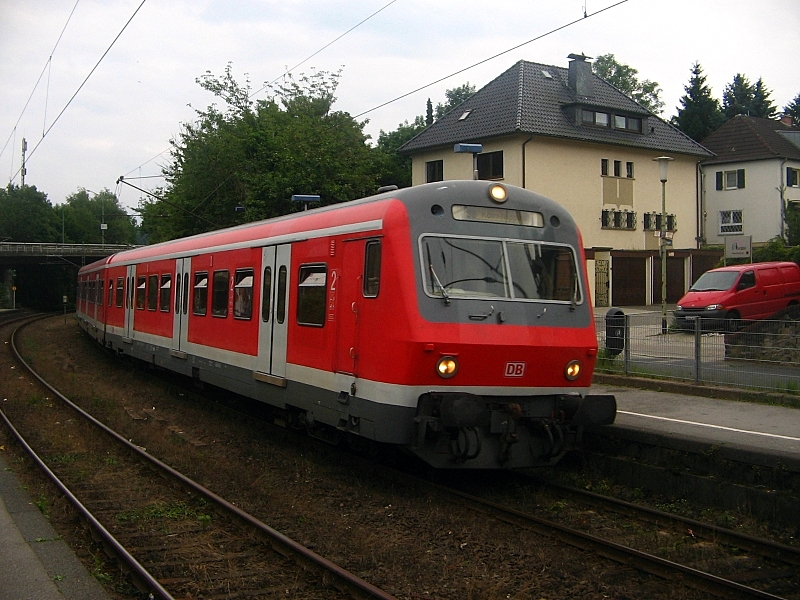
S-Bahn train in Essen-Werden station

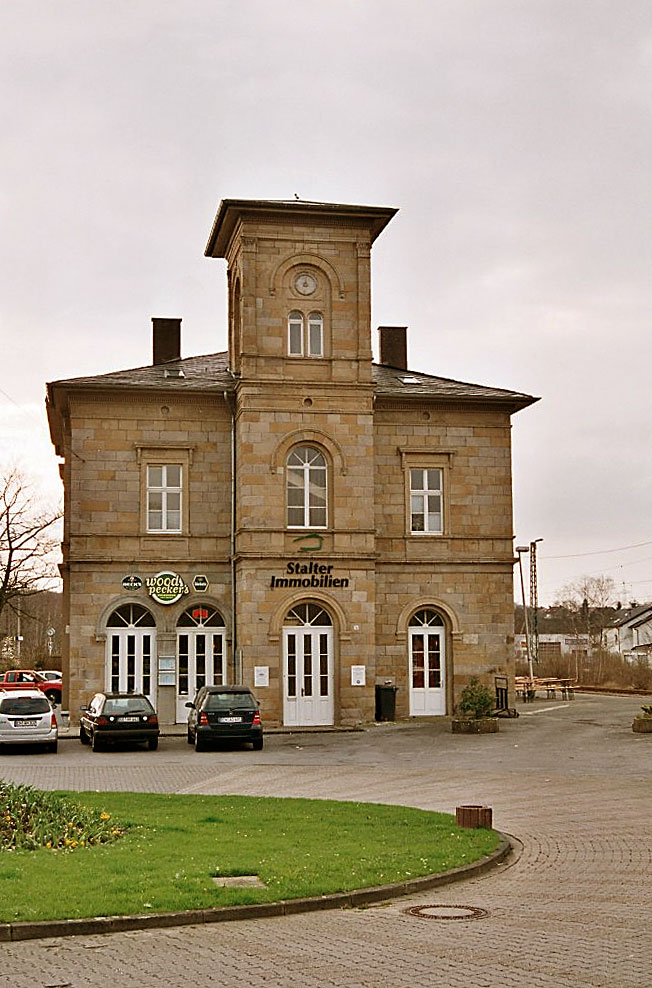
Hattingen (Ruhr) station

=== Trunk line ===
The main line of the Ruhr Valley line was opened on 1 February 1872, from Oberbilk BME (now Düsseldorf-Oberbilk), through Düsseldorf BME (now Düsseldorf Hbf), Düsseldorf-Derendorf, Düsseldorf-Rath and Ratingen Ost, passing through a tunnel through the Hösel mountain and across a bridge over the Ruhr valley—now the site of the Kettwig Reservoir (Kettwig Stausee)—to Kettwig, running on the northern side of the Ruhr to Essen-Werden to Essen-Heisingen and crossing the river again to Kupferdreh. From there as far as Essen-Überruhr it combined with the Wuppertal-Vohwinkel–Essen-Überruhr line opened in 1847, which was extended in 1863, after its takeover by the BME, over a new bridge over the Ruhr at Steele via Steele station to connect with the Witten-Dortmund–Oberhausen-Duisburg and the Steele–Dahlhausen lines. On 1 June 1874, the Ruhr Valley line was extended on the south side of the Ruhr via Altendorf to a new bridge over the Ruhr to Dahlhausen. In 1877, a line was opened from Werden to Essen.

In 1926, the Niederberg line was opened from near Kettwig Stausee station to Wülfrath via Heiligenhaus and Velbert. The section to Heiligenhaus was closed in 1960.

=== Lower Ruhr Valley Railway ===
In 1876 the Lower Ruhr Valley Railway (Untere Ruhrtalbahn) was opened over a new bridge over the Ruhr at Kettwig Stausee, downstream of the Ruhr Valley line bridge, connecting to the Ruhr Valley line near Kettwig station. The line branched off the main Duisburg–Essen–Witten line in Styrum and ran on the south side of the Ruhr through Broich (Mülheim), Saarn, Mintard and Kettwig to the new bridge. In Broich a connecting curve was built to Speldorf station on the Rhenish line.

At the end of the Second World War, the two adjacent railway bridges over the Ruhr in Kettwig Stausee were blown up by the German Army along with the bridge at Styrum on the Lower Ruhr Valley line. Only the upstream bridge at Kettwig Stausee was rebuilt on the Ruhr Valley line between Kettwig and Düsseldorf. Passenger trains on the Lower Ruhr Valley line coming from Mülheim initially stopped at Kettwig vor der Brück station. In 1953 a new Kettwig Stausee station was opened near Kettwig Stausee station on the Ruhr Valley line so that passenger could interchange between the two lines. The destroyed bridge was not rebuilt, and now only a pillar of it remains in Kettwig reservoir. As a result of the destruction of the bridge in Styrum, Speldorf station became the terminus of the Lower Ruhr Valley line instead of Styrum station.

=== Middle Ruhr Valley Railway ===
The Middle Ruhr Valley Railway (Mittlere Ruhrtalbahn) was opened on 28 December 1869 from Dahlhausen via Hattingen, where it crossed to run on the south side of the Ruhr to the Henrichshütte steel works in Welper. On 1 June 1874, it was extended via Herbede and Wengern to Herdecke (now Vorhalle).

=== Upper Ruhr Valley Railway ===
The Upper Ruhr Valley Railway (Obere Ruhrtalbahn) was opened in 1870 via Schwerte along the river through Fröndenberg to Arnsberg. In 1871 it was extended to Meschede, in 1872 to Bestwig and in 1873 to Brilon-Wald and Warburg. It crosses the watershed between the Rhine and the Weser in Elleringhausen tunnel near Olsberg.

== Closures ==
Passenger services were abandoned in 1959 and between Überruhr and Dahlhausen, in 1965 between Werden and Kupferdreh and in 1968 between Mülheim and Stausee. Freight on these three sections was progressively abandoned in 1966/1968, 1965/1978 and 1968/1978 respectively.

On the Hattingen-Wenger-Ost section passengers services were abandoned on 23 May 1971. Freight services on this section were also abandoned following the closure of the Henrichshütte steel works in Hattingen.

== Current operations ==
Passenger services operate on sections of the line as follows:

- Düsseldorf–Essen–Werden: line S 6 of the Rhine-Ruhr S-Bahn,
- Essen–Überruhr–Essen–Kupferdreh: line S 9, and
- Bochum–Dahlhausen–Hattingen: S 3.

The From Ruhr to Ruhr bike trail (Von-Ruhr-zur-Ruhr-Radweg) runs along the route of the former second track of the section between Herbede and Wenger.

Since the beginning of 2005, the Bochum-Dahlhausen–Hattingen–Herbede–Wengern Ost–Hagen-Vorhalle–Hagen Hbf section of the line (the Middle Ruhr Valley Railway) has been used for tourist traffic. The Bochum Dahlhausen Railway Museum (Eisenbahnmuseum Bochum-Dahlhausen) had operated trains on the Herbede–Wengern Ost section since 1981. The track is owned by the Ruhr Regional Association (Regionalverband Ruhr, RVR). The tourist trains are operated by TouristikEisenbahn Ruhrgebiet GmbH, a wholly owned subsidiary of RVR.
