= S6 (Rhine-Ruhr S-Bahn) =

Line S 6 is a S-Bahn line in the Rhein-Ruhr network. It calls, among others, at the cities of Essen, Düsseldorf and Cologne and was the first S-Bahn line in the Rhine-Ruhr network, becoming operational on 28 September 1967 between Ratingen Ost and Düsseldorf-Garath. It is operated at 20-minute intervals using coupled sets of class 422 four-car electrical multiple units.

Line S 6 runs over lines built by various railway companies:

- from Essen Hauptbahnhof to Essen-Werden over the Essen-Werden–Essen railway, opened by the Bergisch-Märkische Railway Company in 1877,
- from Essen-Werden to Düsseldorf Hauptbahnhof over the Ruhr Valley Railway, opened by the Bergisch-Märkische Railway Company in 1872 and 1874,
- from Düsseldorf to Cologne over the Cologne–Duisburg railway, opened by the Cologne-Minden Railway Company in 1845 and
- from Cologne to Köln-Nippes over the West Lower Rhine Railway opened by the Cologne-Crefeld Railway Company in 1855.

It was opened on 28 September 1967 between Ratingen Ost and Düsseldorf-Garath. It was extended from Ratingen Ost to Essen on 26 May 1968 and from Garath to Langenfeld (Rheinl) on 12 December 1968, from Langenfeld to Köln Hansaring on 2 June 1991 and from Hansaring to Köln-Nippes on 13 June 2004.
