= Düsseldorf Volksgarten station =

Railway station in Düsseldorf, Germany

Düsseldorf Volksgarten
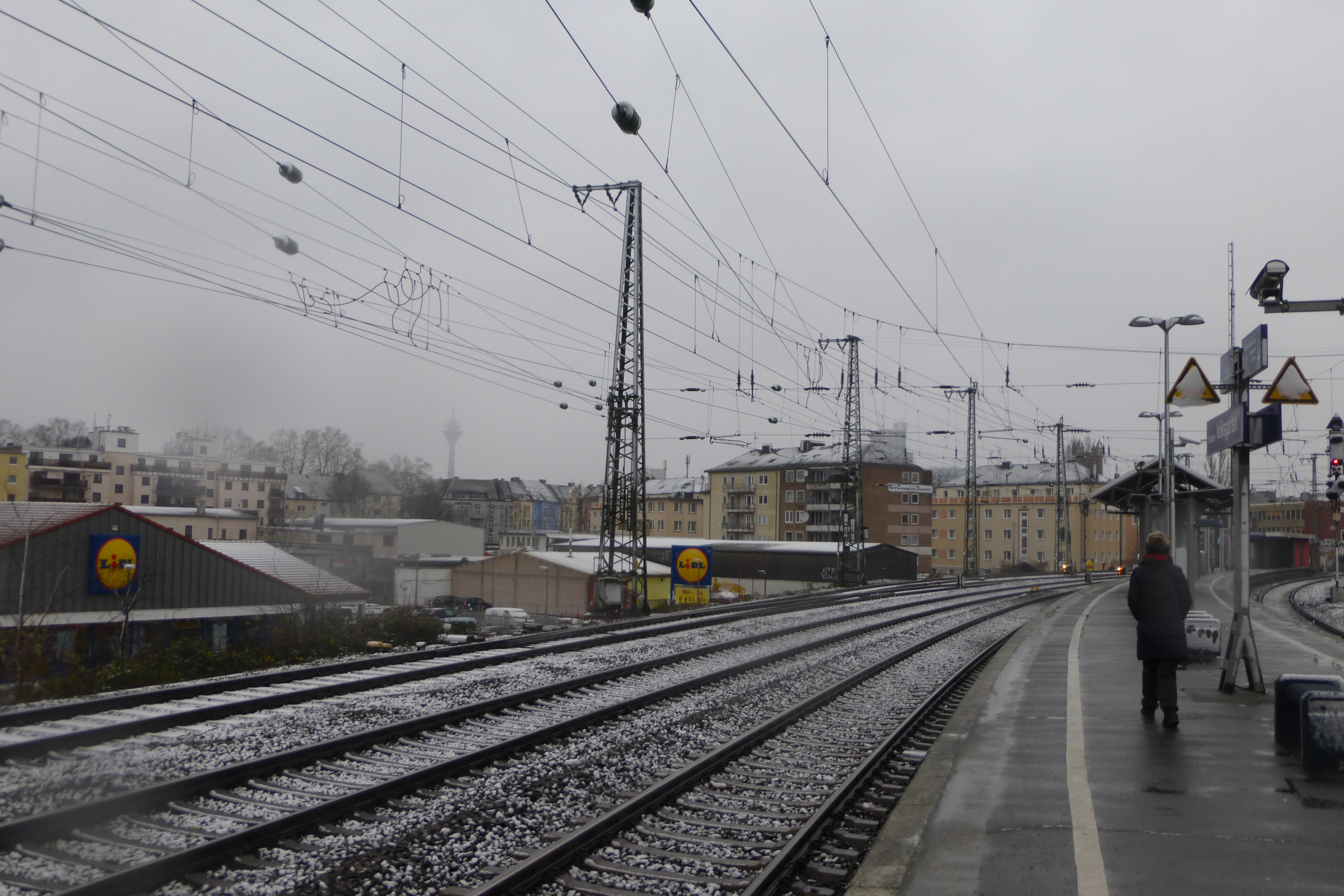
- in Winter, 2014

General information
- Location: Kruppstr. 57, Düsseldorf, NRW; Germany
- Coordinates: 51°12′36.1″N 6°47′31.2″E
- Lines: Cologne–Duisburg (KBS 415)
- Platforms: 2

Construction
- Accessible: No

Other information
- Station code: 1402
- DS100 code: KDV
- IBNR: 8001581
- Category: 5
- Fare zone: VRR: 430; VRS: 1430 (VRR transitional zone)
- Website: www.bahnhof.de

History
- Opened: 1968

Passengers
- 10,000–15,000

Services
Preceding station	Rhine-Ruhr S-Bahn	Following station
Düsseldorf-Oberbilk towards Solingen Hbf	S1	Düsseldorf Hbf towards Dortmund Hbf
Düsseldorf-Oberbilk towards Köln-Nippes	S6	Düsseldorf Hbf towards Essen Hbf
Düsseldorf-Oberbilk towards Langenfeld	S68	Düsseldorf Hbf towards Wuppertal-Vohwinkel
Location

Düsseldorf Volksgarten station is in the district of Oberbilk in central Düsseldorf in the German state of North Rhine-Westphalia. It is on the Cologne–Duisburg line and is classified by Deutsche Bahn as a category 5 station. it is served by Rhine-Ruhr S-Bahn lines S 1 and S 6 and by line 706 of the Düsseldorf tram network, which has an adjoining stop. In 2002, the number of entering, exiting and transferring passengers was around 10,000–15,000 per working day. It is one of the six most highly frequented railway stations in the city of Düsseldorf. It belongs to the tariff area of the Verkehrsverbund Rhein-Ruhr (Rhine-Ruhr Transport Association) and is located in fare zone 53: Düsseldorf-Süd.

== Location ==
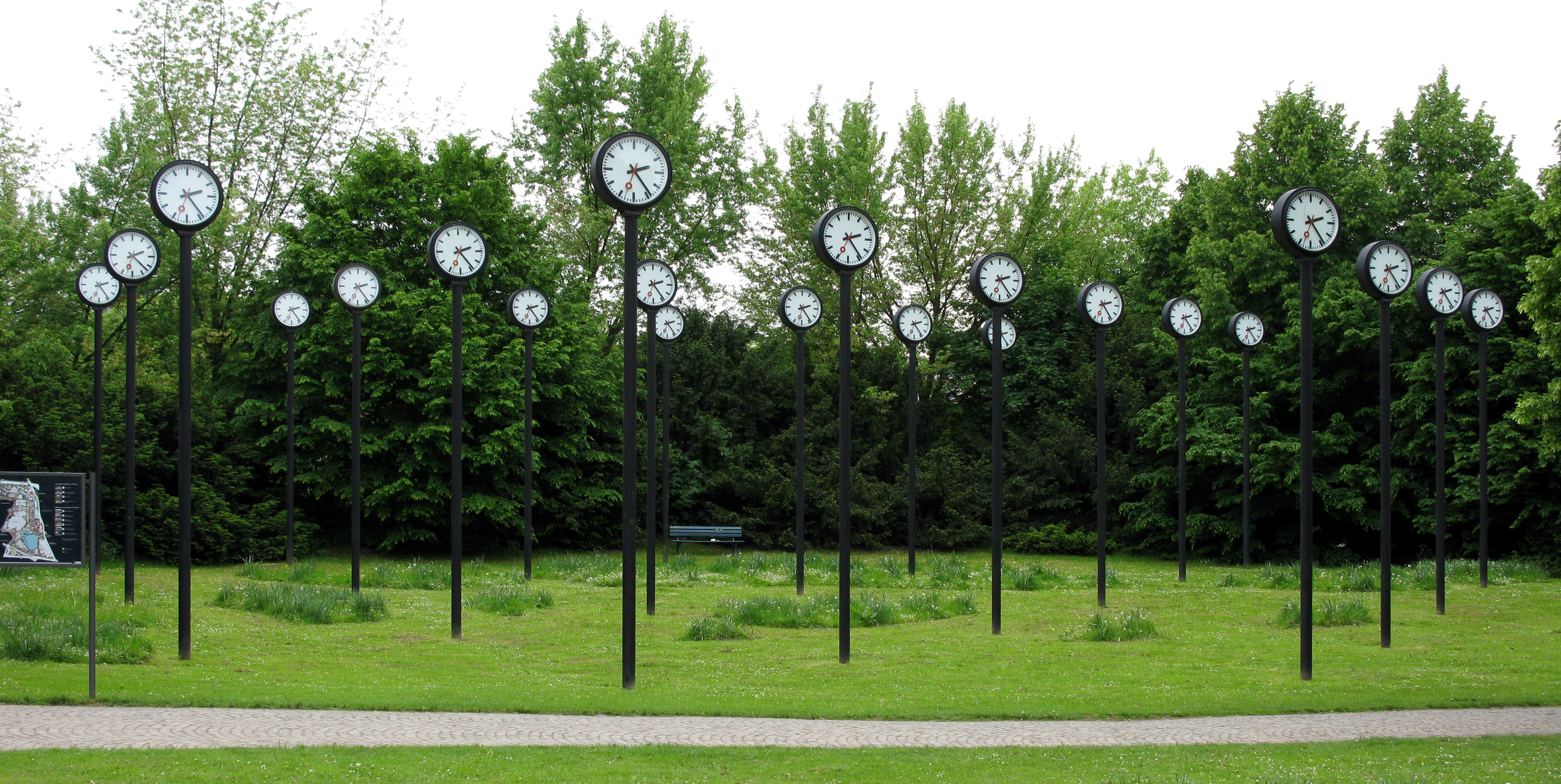
Entrance to Volksgarten with Zeitfeld art decoration

The station is on the line between Cologne and Duisburg, about 2 km south of Düsseldorf Hauptbahnhof. It is located on the borders of the districts of Düsseldorf-Friedrichstadt, Düsseldorf-Oberbilk and Dusseldorf-Bilk. It is elevated on the railway above the streets of Oberbilker Allee and Kruppstraße. South of the platform are the sports facilities of TuRU Düsseldorf including its football stadium, Stadion an der Feuerbachstraße. On the opposite side of Kruppstraße is the entrance to a park called Volksgarten ("people’s garden"), after which the station is named. This was substantially upgraded for the Federal Garden Show in 1987. Volksgarten station, along with the next station towards Cologne, Düsseldorf-Oberbilk, had a major role in conveying people to the Garden Show.

== History ==
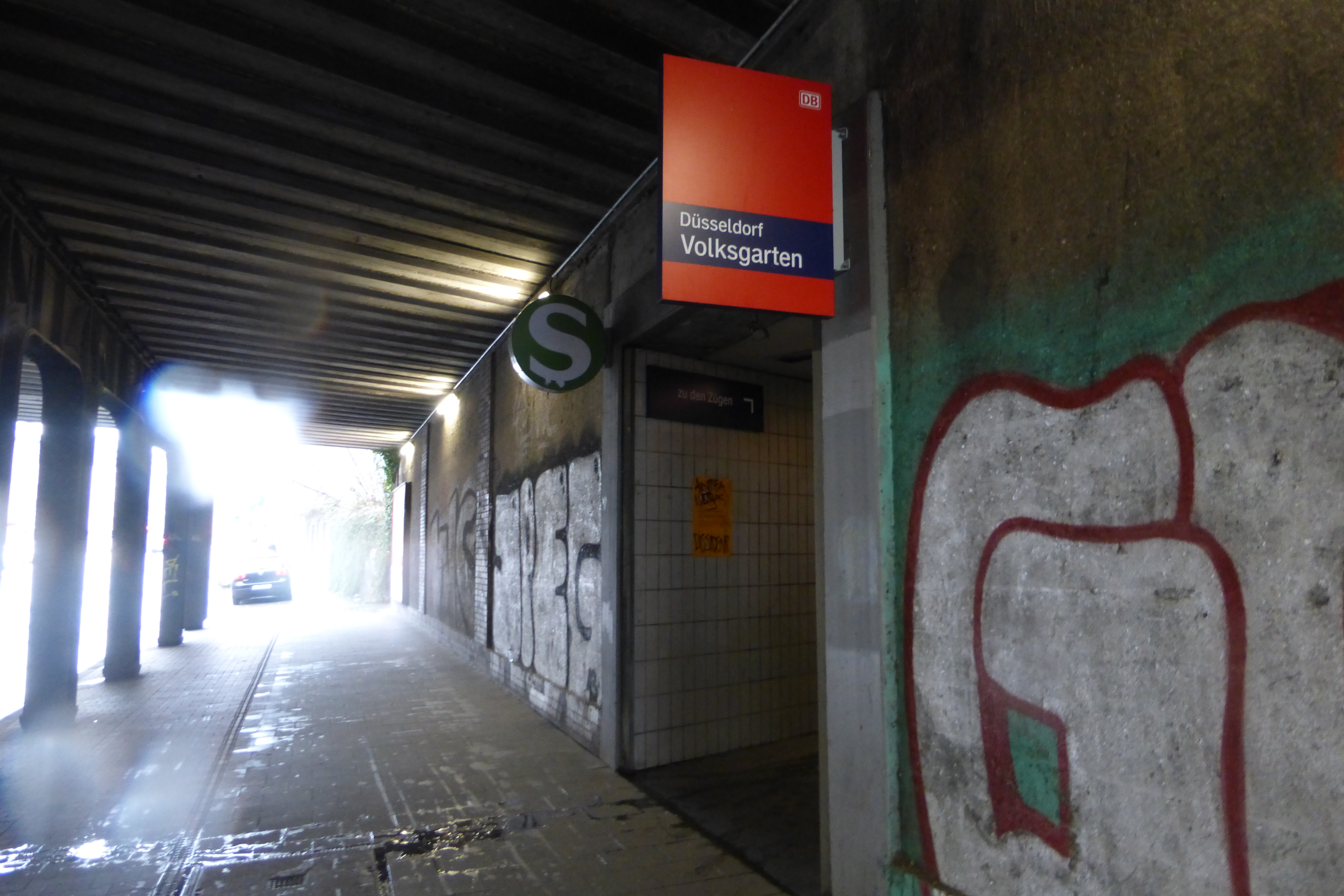
Station entrance, 2014

Volksgarten Dusseldorf station was built to coincide with the opening of the Rhine-Ruhr S-Bahn in September 1967. There was no earlier station at this point. The line opened between the stations of Düsseldorf-Garath and Ratingen Ost, including Volksgarten, was the first new commuter line built in Germany after the Second World War.

In preparation for the 1987 Federal Garden Show, new equipment was added to the station. At the western and the eastern area of the platform, two large roof structures were installed to protect passengers from rain.

As part of a modernisation at several stations in Düsseldorf, the station was equipped at the beginning of the 2000s with new train destination indicators with split-flap displays.

== Station layout ==
The station has a central platform with entrances on Oberbilker Allee and on Kruppstraße and Straße Auf'm Hennekamp. However, these only have stairs rather than escalators. Since it has no lift, the station does not have barrier-free access for the disabled.

== Services ==
Volksgarten station is located on the south-eastern branch of the Rhine-Ruhr S-Bahn through Düsseldorf. It is served by lines S 1 and S 6 at 20-minute intervals. It is also served by some services on line S 68 during peak hours. It is also served by tram line 706 running to central Düsseldorf and other eastern and southern districts. Line 706 runs throughout the day as a ring line at 10-minute intervals.

Line	Route
S1	Dortmund Hbf – Bochum Hbf – Essen Hbf – Duisburg Hbf – Düsseldorf Airport – Düsseldorf Hbf – Düsseldorf Volksgarten – Hilden – Solingen Hbf
S6	Essen Hbf – Kettwig – Ratingen Ost – Düsseldorf Hbf – Düsseldorf Volksgarten – Leverkusen Mitte – Cologne Hbf – Köln-Nippes
Tram 706	Düsseldorf-Hamm – Schadowstraße – Düsseldorf Volksgarten – Am Steinberg
