= Johann Josef Scotti =

German publisher and writer

Johann Josef Scotti (7 May 1787 – 3 April 1866) was a Prussian civil servant, publisher and writer.

== Life ==
Born in Bonn, Scotti came from a family with Italian and German roots. He spent his youthful years in Cologne. In 1804/1805, he attended the Kunstakademie Düsseldorf. His fellow pupil at the time was the later famous painter Peter von Cornelius. In Düsseldorf, Scotti pursued an administrative career. After working for the "General-Sekretair" of the Grand-Ducal-Bergian Minister of Finance (Jacques Claude Beugnot, latterly Johann Peter Josef Bislinger) as "bureau chief" and had also done military service in the German campaign of 1813 as a non-commissioned officer of the 11th Hussar Regiment, he was appointed in 1816 as the 6th registrar of the Regierungsbezirk Düsseldorf, founded in 1815. His further career there led him to the position of a "royal Prussian government secretary". As such, he headed the government registry.

On 27 August 1816, Scotti married Johanna Henriette Luise Wintgens († 1824). The couple had three sons and one daughter. Scotti last lived at Friedrichstraße 19 (1855), 7 (1856) and 11 (1859) in Düsseldorf-Unterbilk. He died there at the age of 78. A plaque at the Old Bilk Cemetery in Düsseldorf-Bilk commemorates him.

=== Publisher of historical legal texts ===
Between 1821 and 1843 Scotti - at first on private initiative and on his own account, from 24 January 1824 on behalf of the Prussian State Ministry - laws and decrees of Rhenish and Westphalian territories of the Holy Roman Empire, the First Empire, the Grand Duchy of Berg, the Grand Duchy of Hesse, the Duchy of Arenberg-Meppen, the Principality of Salm, the Principality of Rheina-Wolbeck of the Salm-Horstmar and other lands and states. These documents, soon to be called the "Scotti'sche Sammlung", span a period from the Middle Ages "to the advent of the royal Prussian governments in 1816". They provide information on significant parts of the public law of the Rhine Province and in Westphalia assigned to the Kingdom of Prussia in the Vienna Congress Act, in particular the Land and Staatsrecht of former Landesherrs, which continued to have an effect into the 19th century. Scotti, who compared his role as a researcher and publisher of historical legal norms to the collecting activity of a "hamster", drew on both as yet unpublished material found in archives and registries as well as texts that had already been published. Since a complete reprint of the entire written material was not possible, he only included the more important documents as well as those that were still valid at his time in their full length. He reproduced the less important pieces in detailed excerpts or briefly outlined their content.

From the beginning, Scotti's editorial activities received the benevolence of his Prussian employer. In particular, he had Scotti obtain official reports on the former territorial relations from the mayors. Because of the historical and practical interest, the Prussian government recommended the writings to its officials and the public for reading.

=== Art writer ===
Scotti's further interest was in the development of the Düsseldorf Academy of Art and the Düsseldorf school of painting, which was flourishing under the directorships of Peter Cornelius and Friedrich Wilhelm von Schadow. He was one of the first and leading members of the Kunstverein für die Rheinlande und Westfalen, which had been founded in 1829 for the purpose of promoting artists through art exhibitions, art purchases and raffles. Around 1833 Scotti resigned from the Kunstverein. According to his own account, he had decided to do so when he expected to be pressured into taking on the role of Kunstverein secretary. The step was taken so that he could continue to devote himself undiminished to his "hoarder profession", the editing of historical legal texts. 1834 trat er dem Verein wieder bei.

In 1836, the lawyer and writer Anton Fahne published Die Düsseldorfer Maler-Schule in den Jahren 1834, 1835 und 1836. In it, the latter advanced in particular the thesis that the Kunstverein and the Düsseldorf Academy disadvantaged Rhenish and Westphalian painters in favour of "Ostländer" (painters from the East Elbians territories of Prussia) and artists of foreign origin. In this situation, Scotti felt compelled to write a replica, which gave him the role of an art writer and art history. In 1837, he published Die Düsseldorfer Maler-Schule, oder auch Kunst-Akademie (The Düsseldorf School of Painting, or Art Academy), in which he sought to refute Rahne's thesis and ridicule its author. This writing, a pamphlet with an idiosyncratic combination of satire and statistics on the origins of artists from the Düsseldorf Academy and their successes, was, however, hardly met with approval. Local and national newspapers reported on the dispute. The Leipzig-based Blätter für literarische Unterhaltung found Fahne's accusation "so childishly unjust in nature that it deserves no refutation at all". They criticised Scotti's rebuttal for having "never come across anything more clumsy, insipid and silly". Scotti's factual elucidation and evidence would become quite useless and unenjoyable in his "wuste of tasteless and hanswurst-like polemics". Fahne responded to Scotti's remarks the same year by writing Meine Schrift "die Düsseldorfer Maler-Schule" und ihre Gegner. The following year, Scotti self-published Der Kunstschule zu Düsseldorf Leistungen in den Jahren 1837 und 1838.

== Publications ==
- Sammlung der Gesetze und Verordnungen, welche in den ehemaligen Herzogthümern Jülich, Cleve und Berg und in dem vormaligen Großherzogthum Berg über Gegenstände der Landeshoheit, Verfassung, Verwaltung und Rechtspflege ergangen sind : vom Jahr 1475 bis zu der am 15. April 1815 eingetretenen Königlich Preuß. Landes-Regierung / zsgest. u. hrsg. nach dem ganzen u. auszugsweisen Inhalt ... mit Zugabe mehrerer Urkunden. 4 Teile, Wolf, Düsseldorf 1821/1822.
- Sammlung der Gesetze und Verordnungen, welche in dem Herzogthum Cleve und in der Grafschaft Mark über Gegenstände der Landeshoheit, Verfassung, Verwaltung und Rechtspflege ergangen sind : vom Jahre 1418 bis zum Eintritt der königlich preußischen Regierungen im Jahre 1816. 5 volumes, Wolf, Düsseldorf 1826.
- Sammlung der Gesetze und Verordnungen, welche in dem vormaligen Churfürstenthum Trier über Gegenstände der Landeshoheit, Verfassung, Verwaltung und Rechtspflege ergangen sind : vom Jahre 1310 bis zur Reichs-Deputations-Schluß-mäßigen Auflösung des Churstaates Trier am Ende des Jahres 1802. 3 parts, Wolf, Düsseldorf 1832.
- Sammlung der Gesetze und Verordnungen, welche in den vormaligen Wied-Neuwiedischen, Wied-Runkel’schen, Sage-Altenkirchen’schen, Sage-Hachenburg’schen, Solms-Braunfels’schen, Solms-Hohensolms-resp. Lich’schen, Nassau-Usingen’schen, Nassau-Weilburg’schen, Herzoglich Nassauischen und Wetzlar’schen (resp. fürstl. Primatischen, großherzogl. Frankfurt’schen etc.) nunmehr Königl. preußischen-Landes-Gebieten, ... ergangen sind : von Eintrittszeit ihrer Wirksamkeit bis 1815–1816. 3 parts, Düsseldorf 1836.
- Die Düsseldorfer Maler-Schule, oder auch Kunst-Akademie in den Jahren 1834, 1835 und 1836, und auch vorher und nachher. Schreiner, Düsseldorf 1837 (Numerized).
- Die Kunstschule zu Düsseldorf. Leistungen in den Jahren 1837 und 1838. self edited, Düsseldorf 1838.
- Sammlung der Gesetze und Verorth-centurydnungen, welche in dem Königlich Preußischen Erbfürstenthume Münster und in den standesherrlichen Gebieten Horstmar, Rheina-Wolbeck, Dülmen und Ahaus-Bocholt-Werth über Gegenstände der Landeshoheit, Verfassung, Verwaltung und Rechtspflege vom Jahre 1359 bis zur französischen Militair-Occupation und zur Vereinigung mit Frankreich und dem Großherzogthume Berg in den Jahren 1806 und resp. 1811 ergangen sind. 3 volumes, Aschendorff, Münster 1842.
- with Johann Mathias Sittel († 1859): Sammlung der Provinzial- und Partikular-Gesetze und Verordnungen, welche für einzelne, ganz oder nur theilweise an die Krone Preußen gefallene Territorien des linken Rheinufers über Gegenstände der Landeshoheit, Verfassung, Verwaltung, Rechtspflege und des Rechtszustandes erlassen worden sind. Enthaltend die Sammlungen für die Grafschaften Nassau-Saarbrücken und Ottweiler und die Reichsherrschaft Illingen. Trier 1843.
