= Borough 3 (Düsseldorf) =

Stadtbezirk 3
- Borough of Düsseldorf
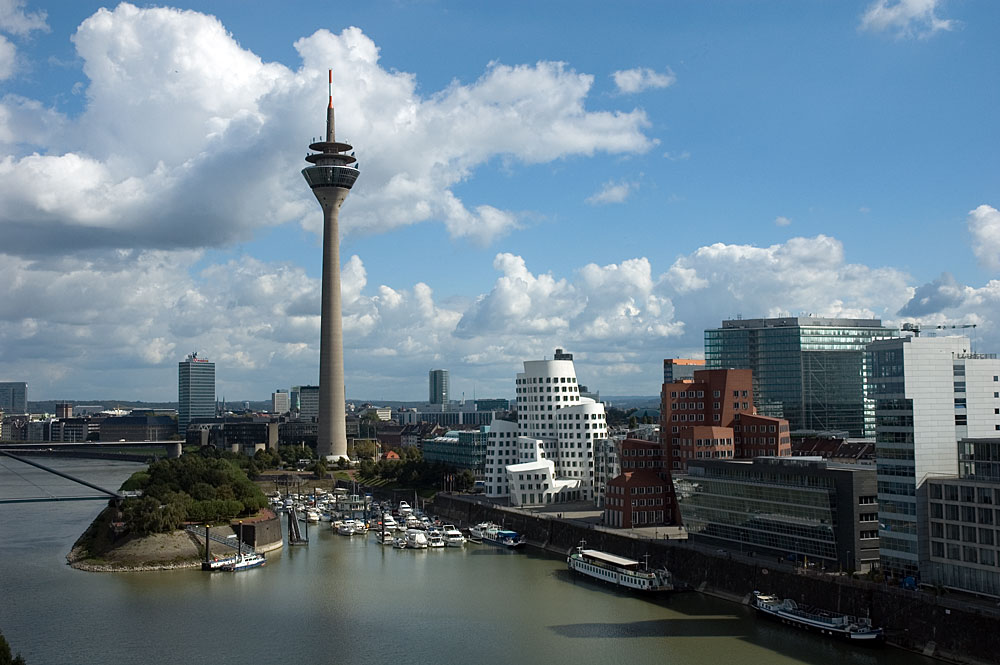
- Rheinturm telecommunications tower at Media Harbour in Düsseldorf-Hafen

- Location of Stadtbezirk 3 within Düsseldorf
- Interactive map of Stadtbezirk 3
- Location within Germany Location within North Rhine-Westphalia
- Coordinates: 51°12′29″N 6°46′36″E
- Country: Germany
- State: North Rhine-Westphalia
- District: Urban district
- City: Düsseldorf
- Subdivisions: 8 quarters

Area
  - Total: 24.71 km^{2} (9.54 sq mi)

Population (2020-12-31)
  - Total: 120,994
  - Density: 4,897/km^{2} (12,680/sq mi)
- Time zone: UTC+01:00 (CET)
  - Summer (DST): UTC+02:00 (CEST)

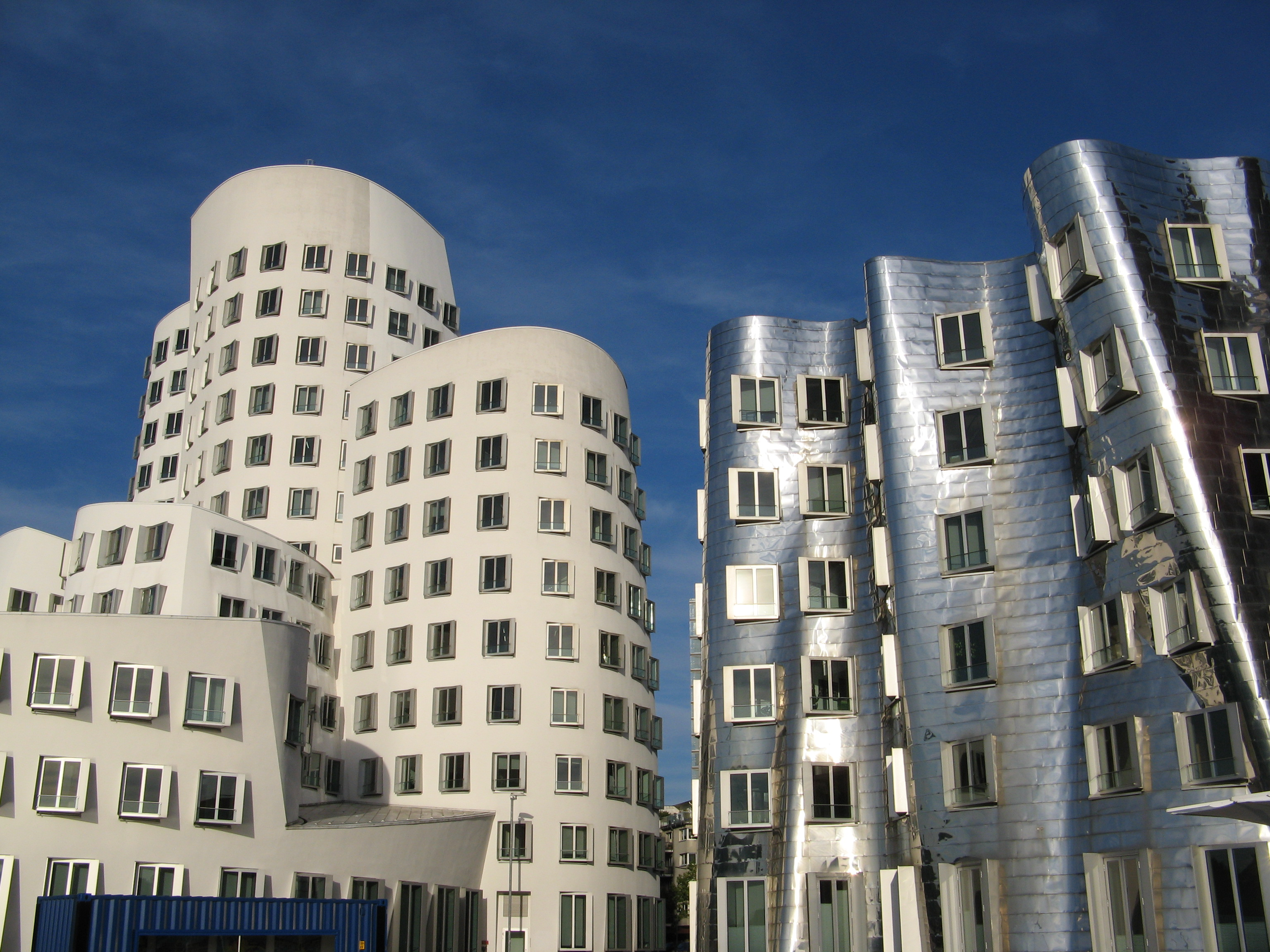
Neuer Zollhof at Medienhafen, designed by Frank Gehry

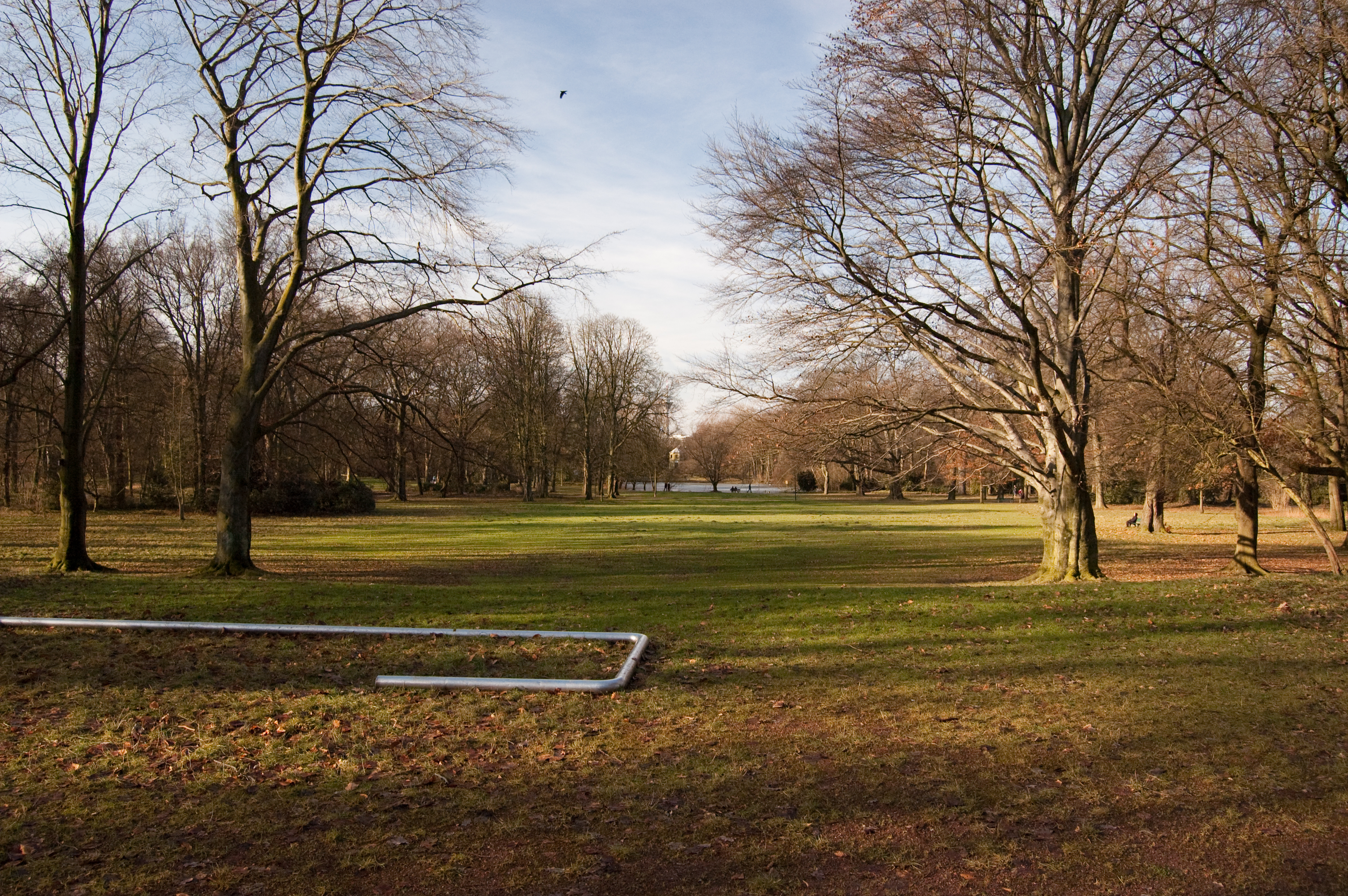
Volksgarten (Südpark) in Oberbilk

Borough 3 (German: Stadtbezirk 3) is a central borough of Düsseldorf, the state capital of North Rhine-Westphalia, Germany and the city's most populous and one of its most diverse boroughs.

Stadtbezirk 3 covers an area of 24.71 square kilometres and (as of December 2020) has about 121,000 inhabitants. The northern quarters, near Borough 1 - like Biedermeier era Friedrichstadt and Oberbilk - have flowing transitions towards Stadtmitte, Düsseldorf's central business district. Hafen is in an ongoing urban regeneration of the old port, which creates ever new loft-style office buildings, convention venues, night clubs, trendy bars and restaurants. On the southern end of the borough, quarters like Volmerswerth and Flehe still manage to preserve their suburban, small-world character.

The borough borders with Düsseldorf boroughs 1 and 4 to the North, boroughs 2, 8 and 9 to the East and South-east and the river Rhine to the South and West. On the left Rhine side lies the city of Neuss.

== Subdivisions ==
Borough 3 is made up of eight Stadtteile (city parts):

| # | City part | Population (2020) | Area (km^{2}) | Pop. per km^{2} |
|---|---|---|---|---|
| 031 | Düsseldorf-Friedrichstadt | 19,607 | 1.00 | 19,413 |
| 032 | Düsseldorf-Unterbilk | 19,335 | 1.59 | 12,237 |
| 033 | Düsseldorf-Hafen | 110 | 3.79 | 28 |
| 034 | Düsseldorf-Hamm | 4,518 | 4.10 | 1,107 |
| 035 | Düsseldorf-Volmerswerth | 2,336 | 2.22 | 1,062 |
| 036 | Düsseldorf-Bilk | 41,150 | 6.07 | 6,713 |
| 037 | Düsseldorf-Oberbilk | 31,179 | 3.94 | 7,954 |
| 038 | Düsseldorf-Flehe | 2,759 | 1.99 | 1,380 |

== Places of interest ==
=== Arts, Culture and Entertainment ===
- Apollo Varieté
- Kunst im Tunnel (KiT)
- Kunstsammlung Nordrhein-Westfalen (Art Collection Northrhine-Westphalia) - K20 (Grabbeplatz) and K21 (Ständehaus)
- Philipshalle

=== Landmarks ===
- Rheinturm telecommunication tower; at 241 m (791 ft) tallest building in Düsseldorf with an observation deck
- Neuer Zollhof; office building, designed by architect Frank Gehry
- Colorium, office building designed by architect Will Alsop
- Landtag of North Rhine-Westphalia; state parliament
- Stadttor, state chancellery
- University of Düsseldorf with University Hospital
- Old St. Martin in Bilk, romanesque church from 10th century

=== Parks and open spaces ===
- Botanischer Garten Düsseldorf, a modern botanical garden
- Südpark
- Südfriedhof

== Transportation ==
The borough is served by numerous railway stations and highway. Largest train station is Düsseldorf Hauptbahnhof, other stations include Düsseldorf Friedrichstadt, Düsseldorf Bilk, Düsseldorf Oberbilk and Düsseldorf Hamm as well as a dense net of both Düsseldorf Stadtbahn underground- and Rheinbahn tram-stations. While the eastern and northern quarters of the borough can be reached via Bundesautobahn 57 and Bundesstraße 1, the southern and western quarters become accessible via Bundesautobahn 46 and Bundesstraße 8.

=== Rhine bridges ===
- Rheinkniebrücke
- Josef-Kardinal-Frings-Brücke
- A 46 Fleher Brücke

== See also ==
- Boroughs of Düsseldorf
