= Ellerstraße station =

Subway station in Düsseldorf, Germany

Coordinates: 51°12′40″N 6°48′28″E

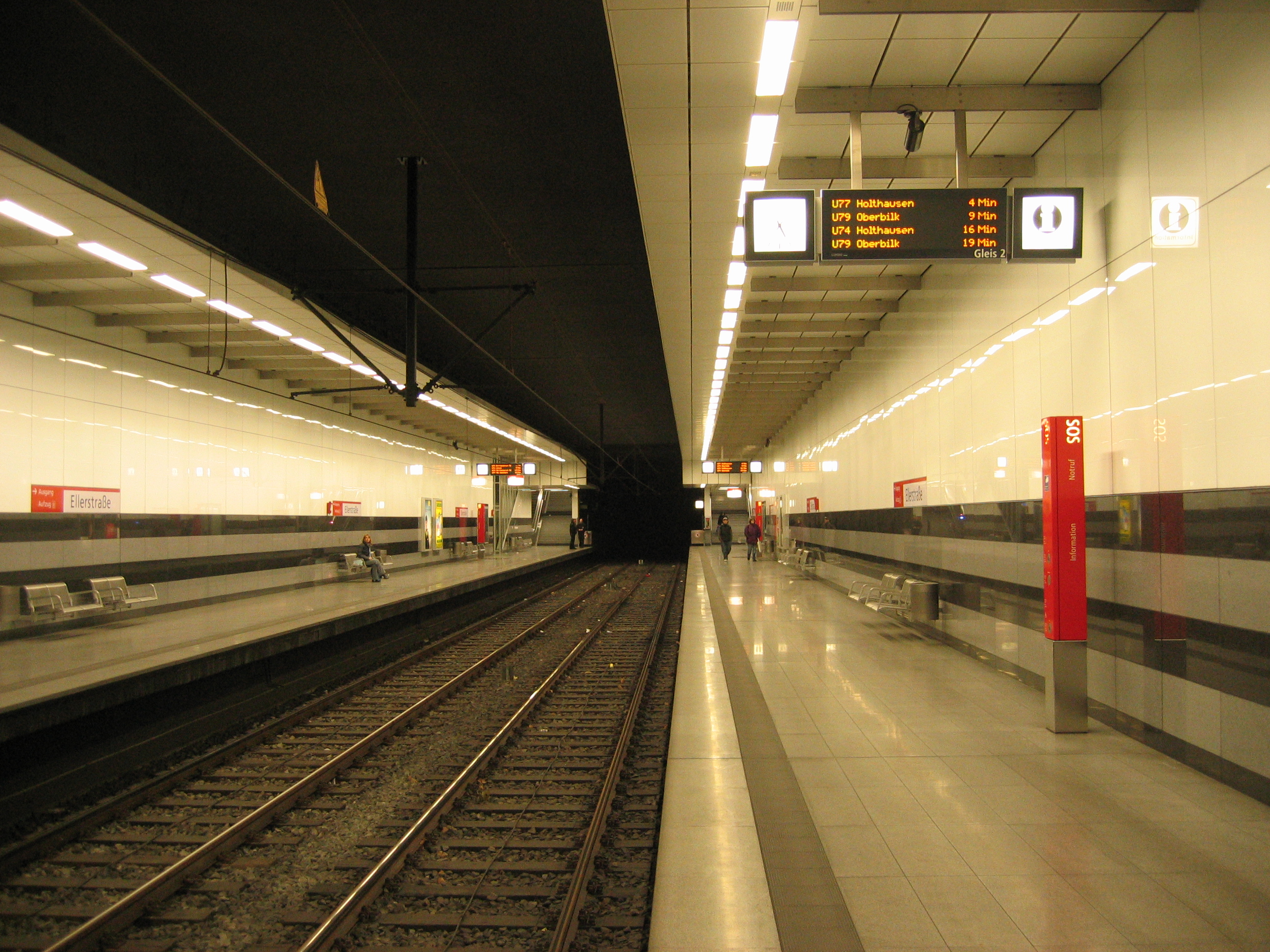
Ellerstraße station in 2008

Ellerstraße is an underground station on the Düsseldorf Stadtbahn lines U74, U77 and U79 in Düsseldorf. The station lies on Ellerstraße in the district of Oberbilk.

The station was opened on 15 June 2002; it consists of two side-platform with two rail tracks.

Preceding station	Rhine-Ruhr Stadtbahn	Following station
Oberbilker Markt/Warschauer Straße towards Meerbusch-Görgesheide	U74	Düsseldorf-Oberbilk towards Holthausen
Oberbilker Markt/Warschauer Straße towards Am Seestern	U77	Düsseldorf-Oberbilk towards Holthausen
Oberbilker Markt/Warschauer Straße towards Duisburg-Meiderich Süd	U79	Düsseldorf-Oberbilk towards Universität Ost/Botanischer Garten
