= Bilk (disambiguation) =

Bilk is a verb meaning to cheat. It can also refer to:

- Acker Bilk (1929–2014), clarinet player
- Bilk (drink), a milk beer made by the Abashiri brewery
- Düsseldorf-Bilk, a part of Düsseldorf in Germany
