= Oberbilker Markt/Warschauer Straße station =

Railway station in Düsseldorf, Germany

Coordinates: 51°12′58″N 6°48′12″E

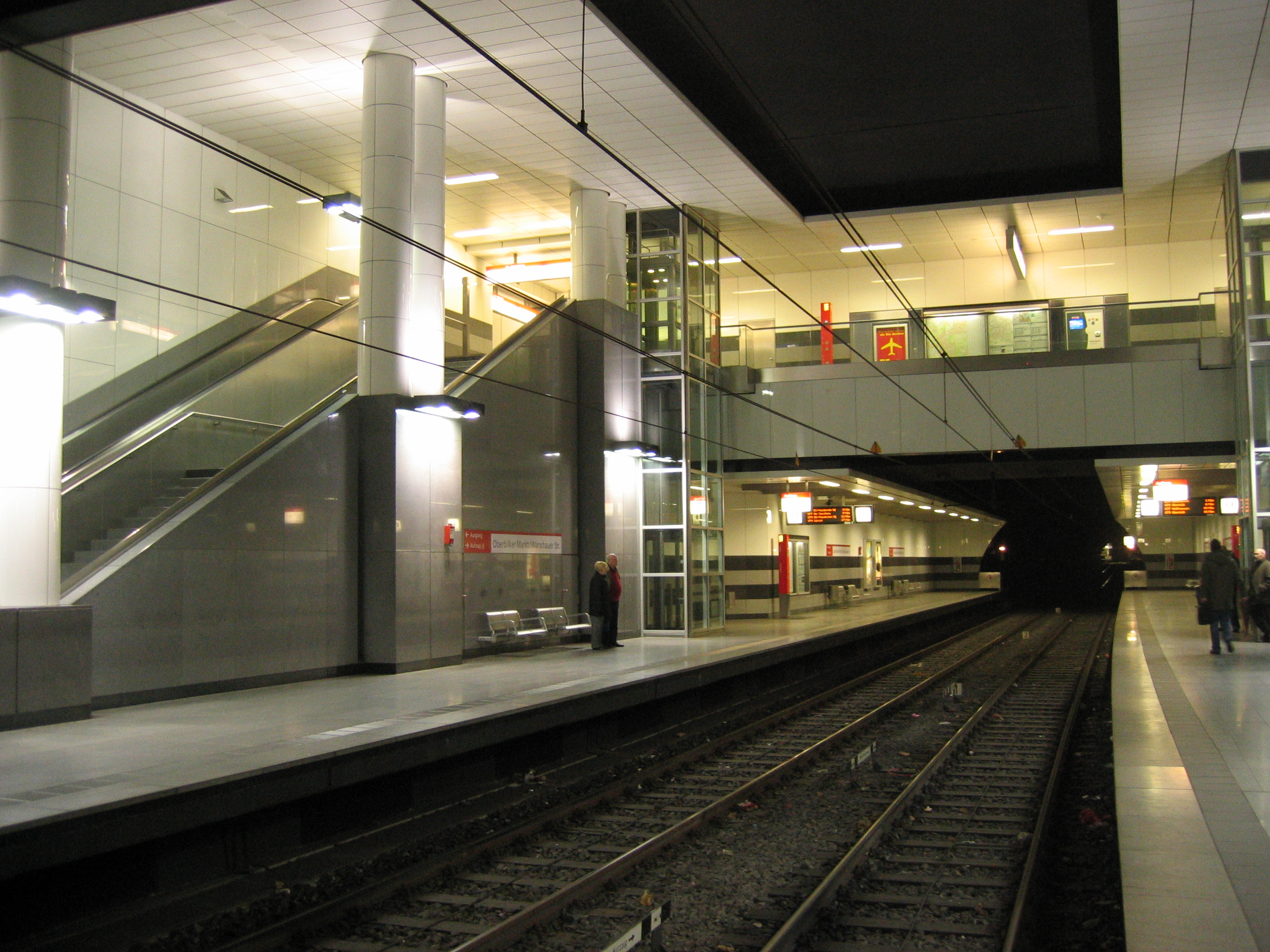
Oberbilker Markt/Warschauer Straße (VRR)

Oberbilker Markt/Warschauer Straße is an underground station on the Düsseldorf Stadtbahn lines U74, U77, and U79 in Düsseldorf, Germany. The station is located at Oberbilker Markt (Warschauer Straße) in the district of Oberbilk.

The station was opened on 15 June 2002; it consists of two side-platform with two rail tracks. On the surface, Interchange to Tram line 706 is possible.

Preceding station	Rhine-Ruhr Stadtbahn	Following station
Düsseldorf Hbf towards Meerbusch-Görgesheide	U74	Ellerstraße towards Holthausen
Düsseldorf Hbf towards Am Seestern	U77	Ellerstraße towards Holthausen
Düsseldorf Hbf towards Duisburg-Meiderich Süd	U79	Ellerstraße towards Universität Ost/Botanischer Garten
