= Düsseldorf-Hamm =

- Stadtteil of Düsseldorf
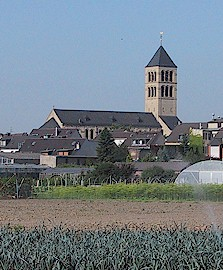
- St. Blasius Church

- Map of Düsseldorf, showing Hamm (in red) within Borough 3 (in pink)
- Interactive map of Düsseldorf-Hamm
- Location within Germany Location within North Rhine-Westphalia
- Coordinates: 51°12′18″N 6°44′40″E
- Country: Germany
- State: North Rhine-Westphalia
- District: Urban district
- City: Düsseldorf
- Borough: Borough 3
- Founded: 789

Area
  - Total: 4.10 km^{2} (1.58 sq mi)

Population (2020-12-31)
  - Total: 4,518
  - Density: 1,100/km^{2} (2,850/sq mi)
- Time zone: UTC+01:00 (CET)
  - Summer (DST): UTC+02:00 (CEST)

Hamm (German pronunciation: [ham]) is an urban quarter of Düsseldorf, part of Borough 3. Hamm is located on the river Rhine, adjacent to the boroughs of Bilk, Volmerswerth, and the central harbour of Düsseldorf. It has an area of 4.10 km^{2} (1.58 sq mi), and 4,518 inhabitants (2020).

To distinguish it from the Westphalian city of Hamm, locals often call it Kappes-Hamm (Kappes is the word for cabbage in the local dialect).

== History ==
In 789 A.C. Hamm was written mentioned first time, second time 875. The earliest registrations of Hamm are from the year 1218. Hamm became a part of Düsseldorf in 1394. Since 1453 there had been a ferry line between Hamm and Neuss until the Josef Cardinal Frings-Bridge was constructed.

The gun club St. Sebastianus from 1458 is one of the oldest gun clubs in that region.

The Thirty-Year War began in 1644 in Hamm when troops of Brandenburg went into the settlement.

So the oldest churches who are still existing are the Rochus Chapel from 1709 and the Cross Chapel from 1658, gifted by the Earl of Palatine Philipp Wilhelm, both Roman Catholic. The Rochus Chapel nowadays is in use by the Greek-Orthodox Church of Düsseldorf. In 1824 a catholic elementary school opened, in 1960 the catholic kindergarten. To visit schools for higher education the students have to go to neighboring boroughs.

== Infrastructure ==
There is a tram line (706) connecting northern Hamm to the central and northern districts of Düsseldorf. The southern part of Hamm is connected with the tram lines 709 and during peak times with the line 704. These trams serve the central districts of Düsseldorf and Neuss.

Düsseldorf-Hamm station is served by the Rhine-Ruhr S-Bahn lines S 8, S 11 and S 28, running on the Mönchengladbach–Düsseldorf railway, which crosses over the Rhine on the Hamm Railway Bridge.

Two of the main roads of Düsseldorf run along the borders of Hamm.

Hamm has an operating kindergarten, "Katholischer Kindergarten Sankt Blasius", and elementary school, "Katholische Grundschule Florensstraße".
