= Flehe =

City district of Düsseldorf, Germany

Coordinates: 51°11′33″N 6°46′09″E

Map of Düsseldorf, showing Flehe (in red) within Borough 3 (in pink)

Flehe (German pronunciation: [ˈfleːə]) is a part of Düsseldorf, Germany, that lies directly on the river Rhine and is bordered by Volmerswerth, Himmelgeist and Bilk. It is part of Borough 3. It has an area of 1.99 km^{2} (0.77 sq mi), and 2,759 inhabitants (2020).

The name Flehe probably comes from the Central German (Mitteldeutsch) word flet meaning a stream.

Flehe became a part of Düsseldorf in 1384, and was first mentioned in documentary records in 1402.

Flehe is a small and relatively sparsely populated part of Düsseldorf. The area from the center of Flehe to the Rhine has a more village-like rather than metropolitan character.

A filtration plant in Flehe purifies water from the Rhine for use as domestic drinking water.

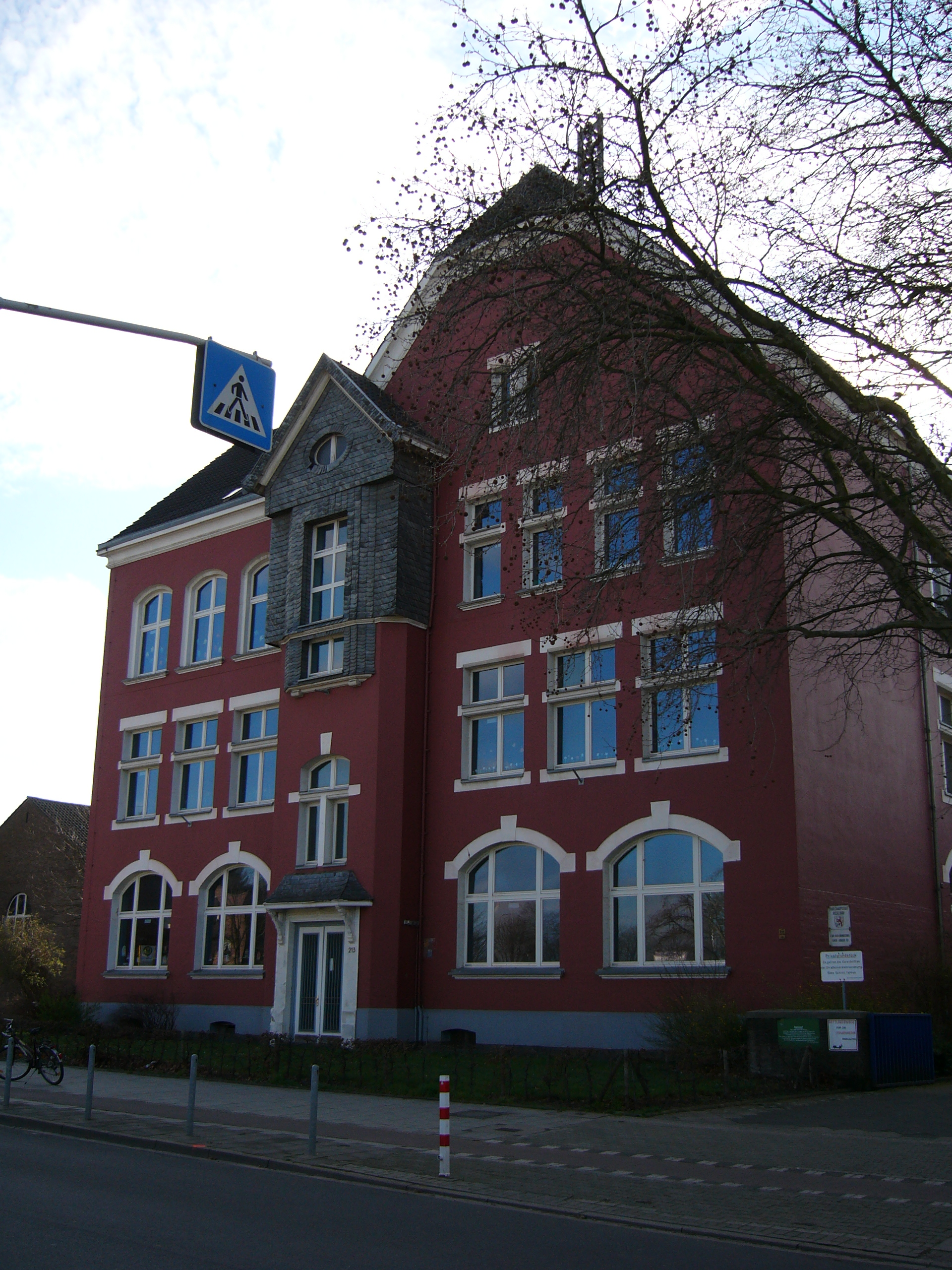
Elementary School of Flehe

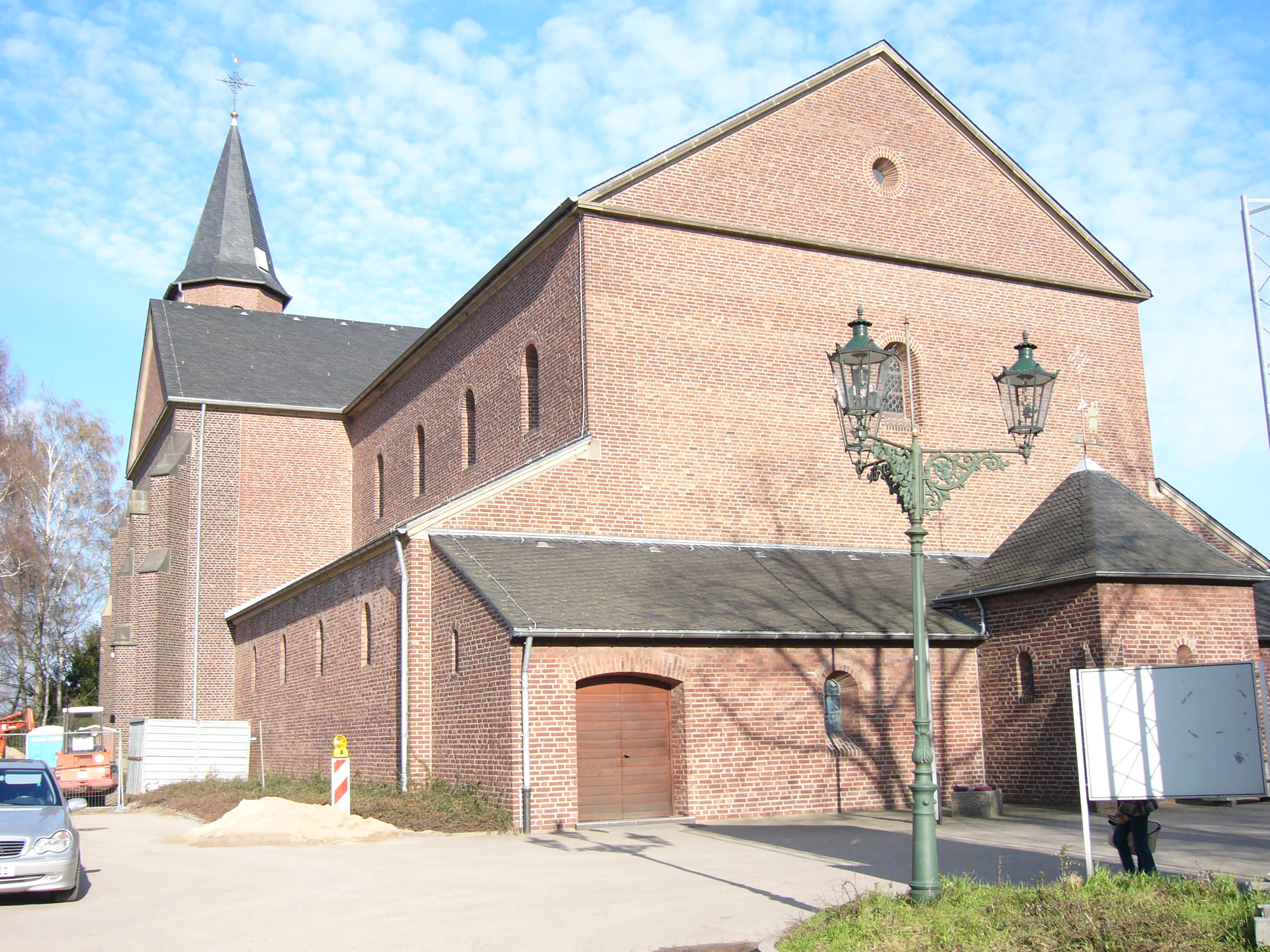
Roman Catholic Church Mater dolerosa

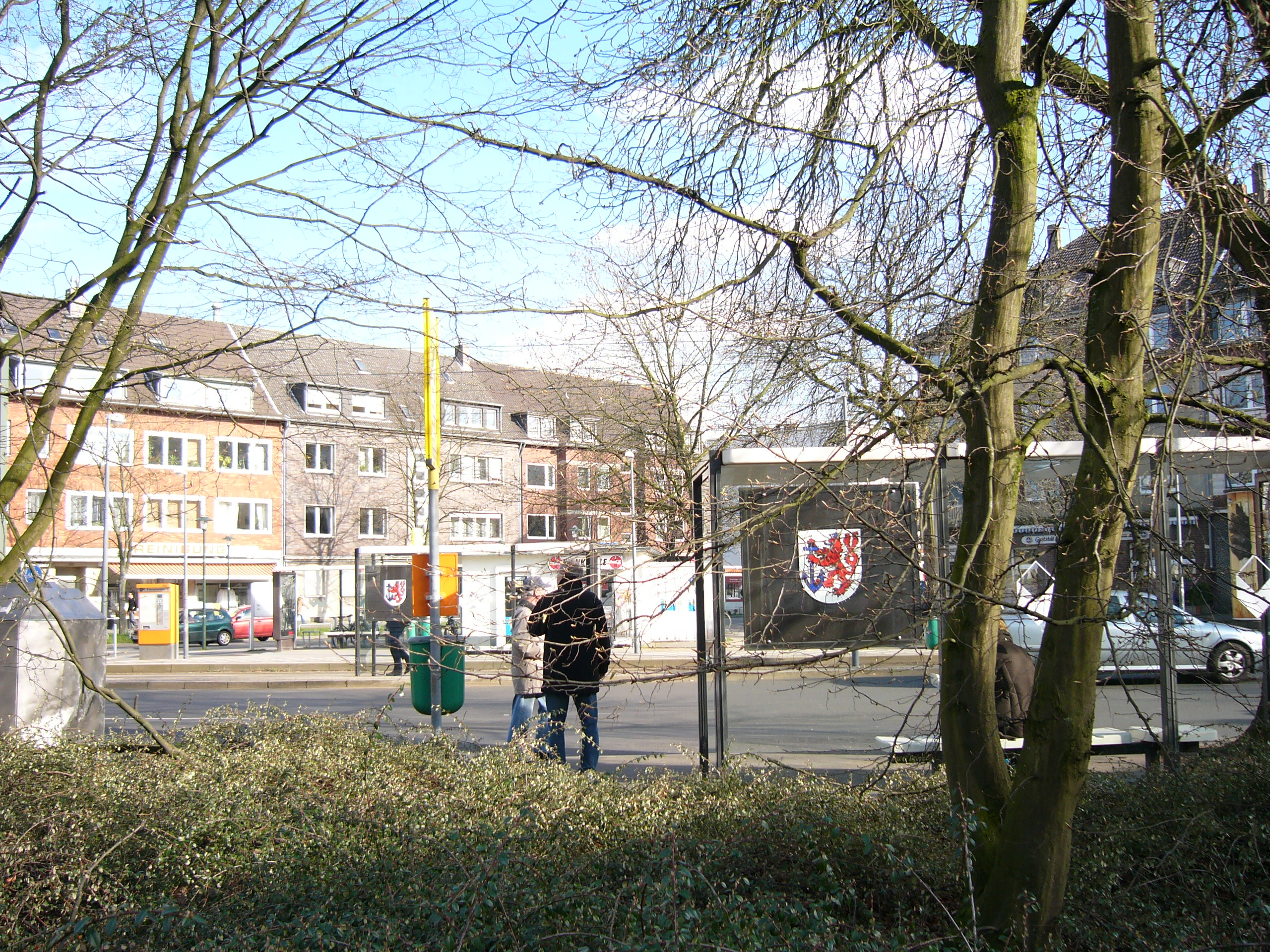
Tram Station Aachner Platz

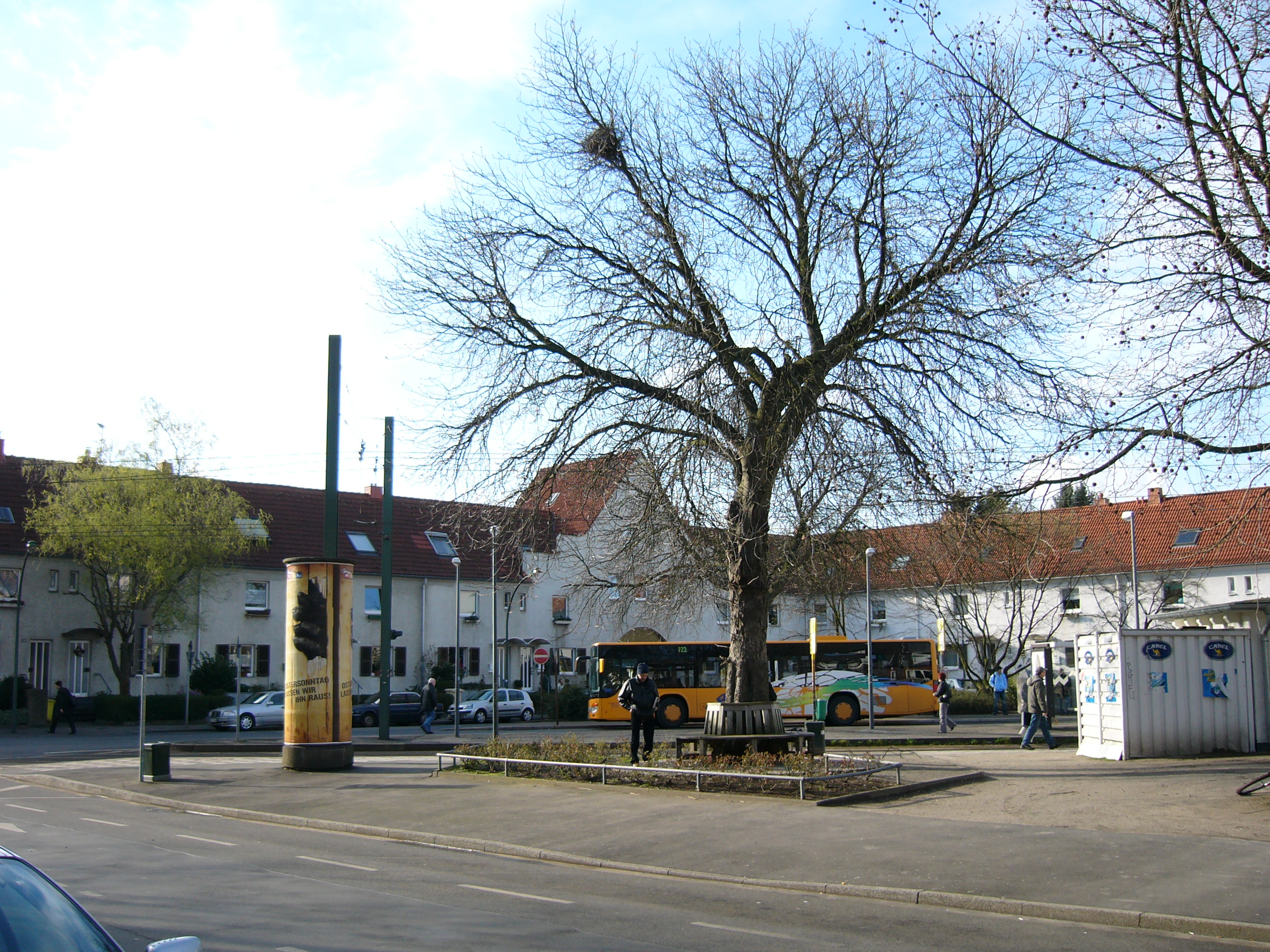
Between Bilk and Flehe (Aachner Platz)
