= Volmerswerth =

City district of Düsseldorf, Germany

Coordinates: 51°11′18″N 6°45′50″E

Map of Düsseldorf, showing Volmerswerth (in red) within Borough 3 (in pink)

Volmerswerth (German pronunciation: [ˈfɔlmɐsˌveːɐ̯t]) is a Stadtteil (quarter) in western Düsseldorf, Borough 3, by the river Rhine. It borders the quarters Hamm, Bilk and Flehe. It has an area of 2.22 km^{2} (0.86 sq mi), and 2,336 inhabitants (2020).

Despite increasing urbanisation, the rural environs of Volmerswerth still draw many people from Düsseldorf and the surrounding Rhineland conurbation. The area is popular with walkers and cyclists, whilst in-line skaters are often seen by the Rhine at weekends.

== History ==
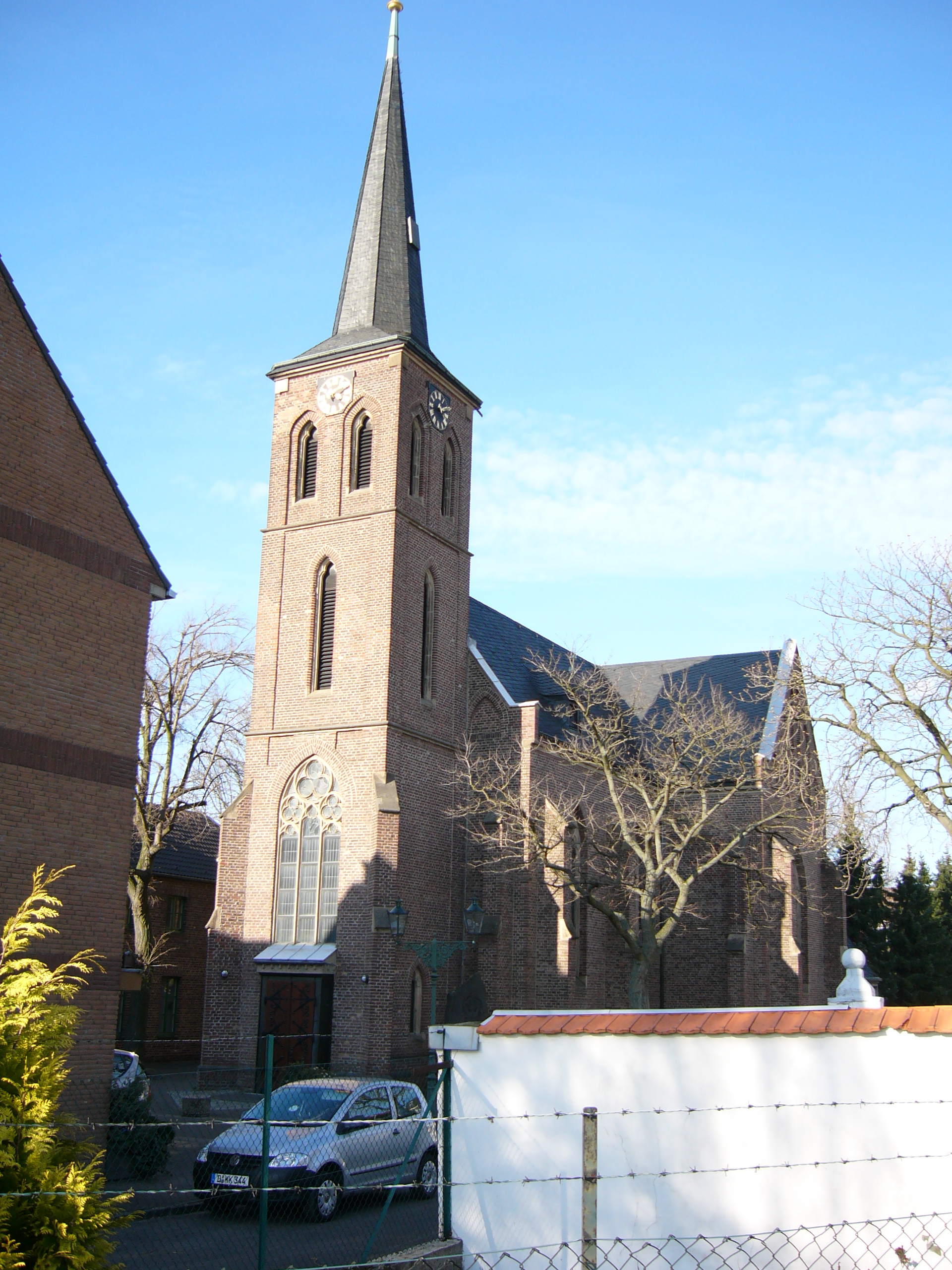
Saint Dionysius Church

The island of Volmerswerth was first mentioned in 1173. At that time the owner of island and patron of the small fishing community was the monastery of Schwarzrheindorf.

Volmerswerth's own church was constructed in 1300. In 1456 the growing town received a justice court and in 1487 it was incorporated into Düsseldorf. The present neo-Gothic church was constructed in 1856.

== Demography ==
2,336 people live in Volmerswerth (2020). Of these, 12.8% are not German citizens (in Düsseldorf as a whole the figure is 23.6%). The reason is that Volmerswerth was traditionally a rural area inside the city of Düsseldorf. The situation is changing because Volmerswerth is one of the few quarters near the river Rhine, where there is space for new housing. The average age in Volmerswerth is 42 years. The unemployment rate is around 10.2%.
