= Neuer Zollhof =

Architectural structure in Germany

Coordinates: 51°12′58″N 6°45′28″E

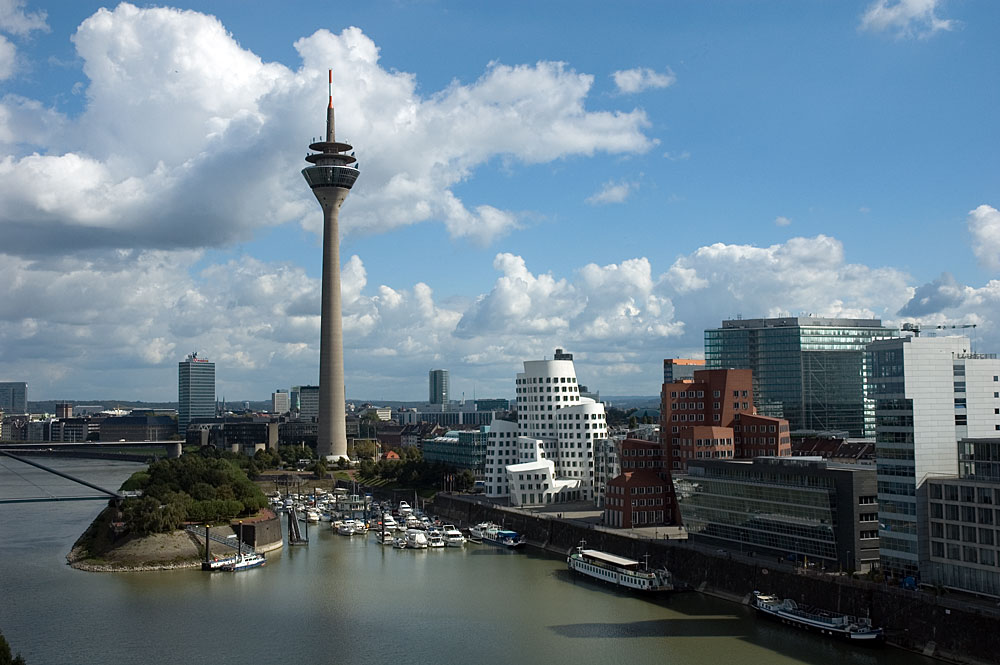
The Media Harbor with Rheinturm telecommunications tower (left) and the three Neuer Zollhof buildings (right)

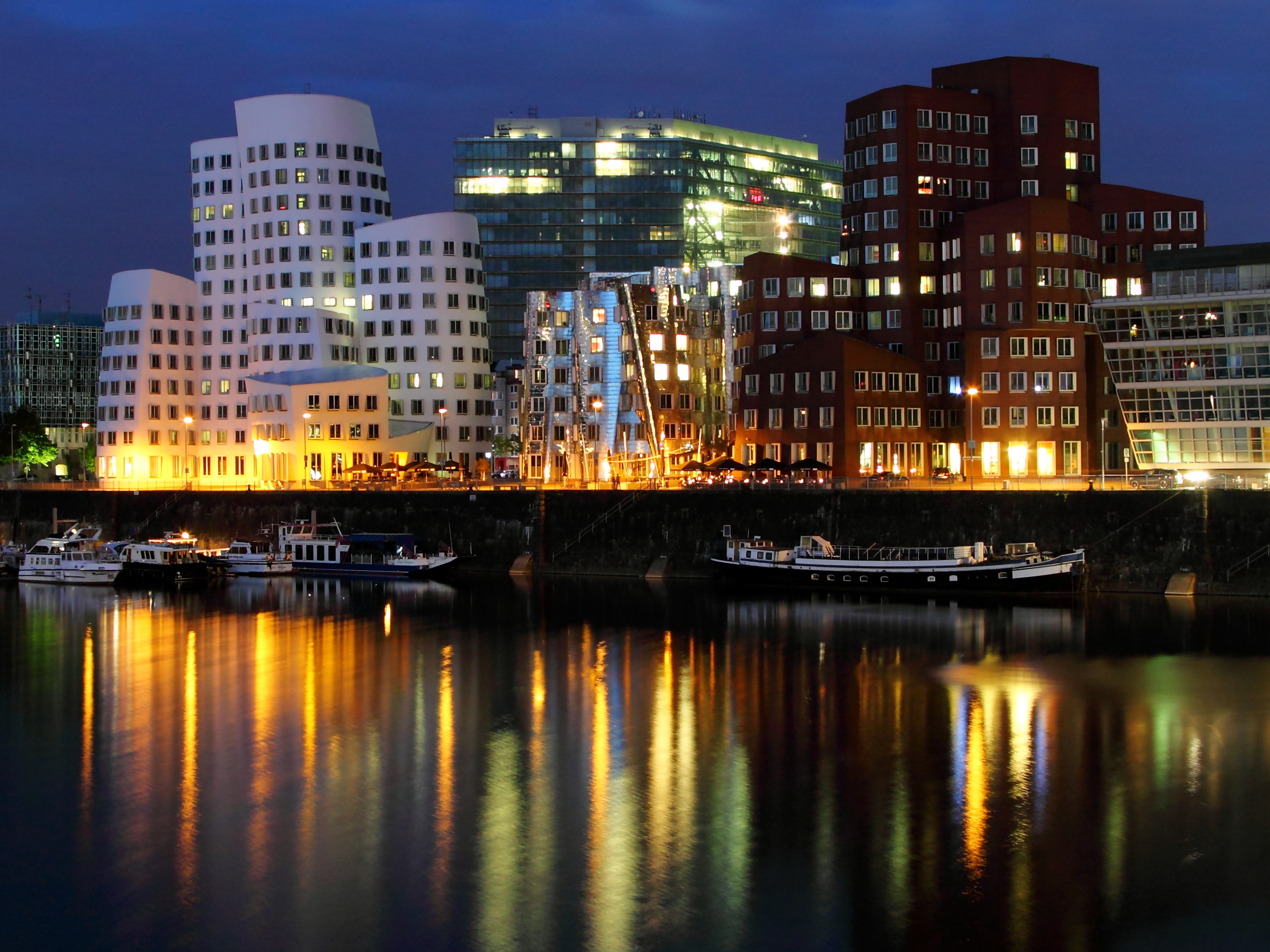
At night

Neuer Zollhof or Der Neue Zollhof (The New Zollhof, named after a former customs facility), located at Neuer Zollhof 2-6, Unterbilk, is a prominent landmark of Düsseldorf-Hafen, part of the redeveloped port of Düsseldorf, Germany.

The building complex consisting of three separate buildings, was designed by Canadian-American architect Frank O. Gehry and completed in 1998. Floorplans and facades of all three buildings curve and lean, leading to them being likened to leaning towers. The tallest building is 14 storeys high and just under 50 m tall. Each building has a different outer wall cladding - the outer two in white plaster and red brick respectively; the central building's stainless steel facade reflects material and shapes of its two neighbour buildings.

The buildings have total gross floor space of 29,000 square metres. A previous architectural design competition for the site was won by Iraqi-British architect Zaha Hadid during the early 1990s, however it was never commissioned.

The buildings are also popular with tourists to the region.

== See also ==
- List of works by Frank Gehry
