= Unterbilk =

City district of Düsseldorf, Germany

Coordinates: 51°12′09″N 6°46′47″E

map of Düsseldorf, showing Unterbilk (in red) within Borough 3 (in pink)

Unterbilk (German pronunciation: [ˈʊntɐbɪlk], lit. 'Lower Bilk', in contrast to "Upper Bilk") is an urban quarter in Borough 3 of the North Rhine-Westphalia state capital Düsseldorf. It is the seat of the Landtag of North Rhine-Westphalia, the Rheinturm tower and, together with the Düsseldorf docks is the centre of the media industry in Düsseldorf.

== Geography ==
Unterbilk has an area of 1.59 km^{2} (0.61 sq mi), and 19,335 inhabitants (2020). It borders the urban boroughs of Hafen (docks), Bilk and Friedrichstadt within Borough 3 and Carlstadt in Borough 1, the very centre of the city.

== History ==
Unterbilk was originally a part of Bilk, and was first mentioned in documents in 799 AD. Düsseldorf was within the parish of Old St. Martin in Bilk until 1206. In 1384 Bilk was incorporated into Düsseldorf.

Unterbilk became a municipal district in its own right when the railway line from Neuss to Düsseldorf was constructed. The part of Bilk south of the line retained the name Bilk and that north of the tracks became Unterbilk.

The Industrial Revolution led to the rapid urbanization of Unterbilk in the 19th century. In 1876 the first horse racing track in Düsseldorf opened within Unterbilk, located on the Lausward meadows beside the Rhine. In 1890 construction began on Düsseldorf's docks, spreading over much of the Lausward meadow area and opening in 1896. The docks area later became a separate municipal district of Düsseldorf.

== Economy ==
The administration of the state of North Rhine-Westphalia is an important local employer, as is the engineering company Siemens. Since the 1980s the service sector has grown, especially after the transformation of much of the nearby docks area into the Medienhafen broadcast media, corporate office and entertainment district from the 1990s onwards.

== Buildings and monuments ==
In the Napoleonic era, the border between Unterbilk and its neighbouring district of Frederichstadt was delineated by Düsseldorf's fortifications. Following the Treaty of Lunéville in 1801 the fortifications were demolished, and the area became public gardens with two linked ornamental ponds, the Schwanenspiegel and Kaiserteich. Overlooking the gardens is the Renaissance-style Ständehaus building that was completed in 1880 and housed the regional parliament until 1988, despite being gutted by fire due to a World War II bombing raid in 1943 that left just its outer shell until reconstruction was completed in 1949. Today it houses part of the region's art collection, the Kunstsammlung Nordrhein-Westfalen.

The regional parliament moved in 1988 from the Ständehaus to buildings near Unterbilk's border with the docks area, close to the Rheinturm tower and the studios of the regional television and radio broadcaster Westdeutscher Rundfunk.

The 20 floor postmodern, parallelogram-shaped office building named the Stadttor (City Gate) opened in 1998 and won architectural awards. Amongst its tenants is the Chancery of the prime minister of North Rhine-Westphalia.

The Florapark gardens opened in 1870 featuring a festival hall and greenhouse with palm trees and exotic animals. The buildings no longer exist.

The headquarters of the Düsseldorf police are in Unterbilk in buildings constructed in the 1920s on the site of a cavalry barracks.

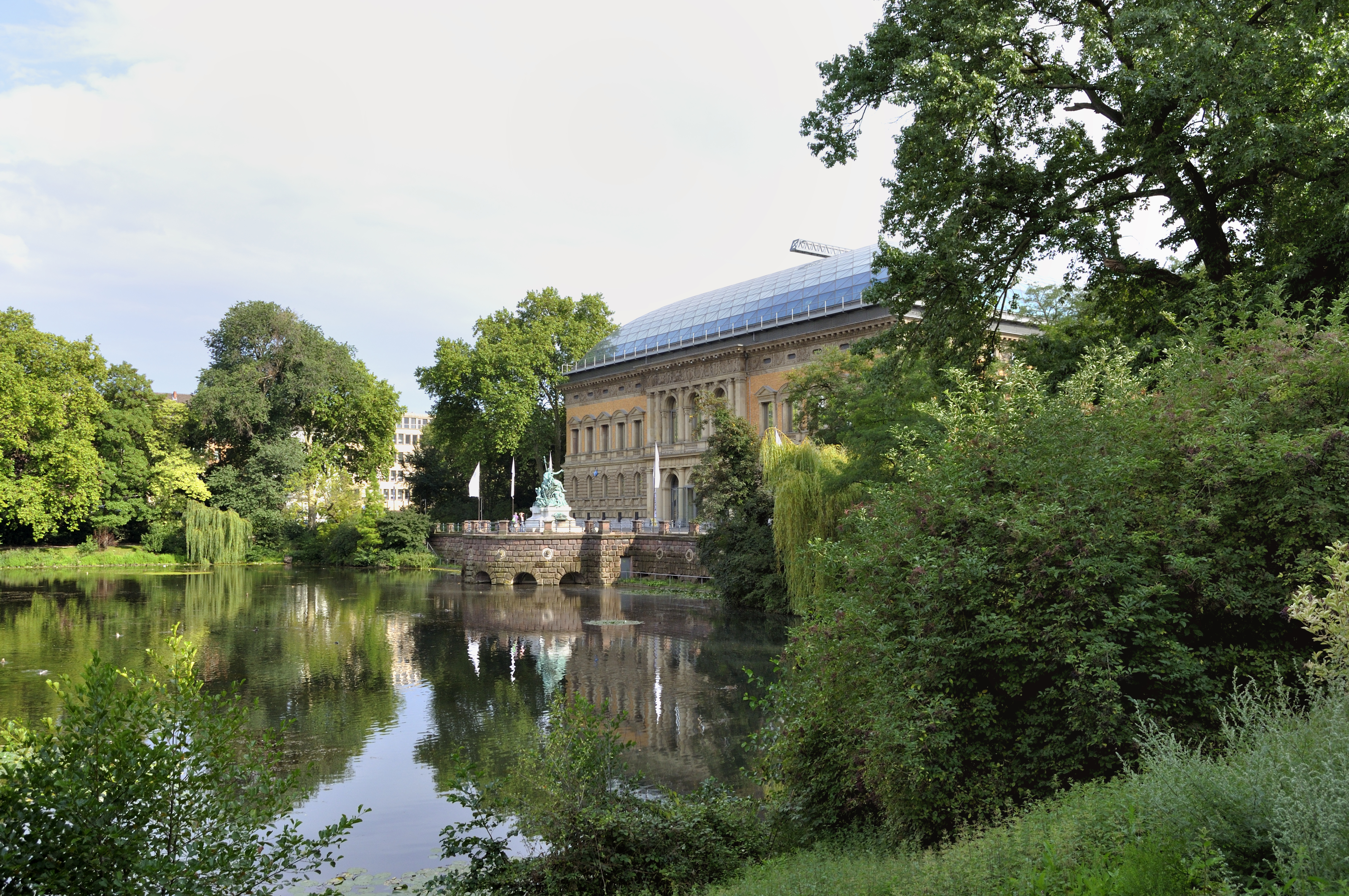
The Kaiserteich pond and the Ständehaus building, seat of the regional parliament until 1988, now an art museum

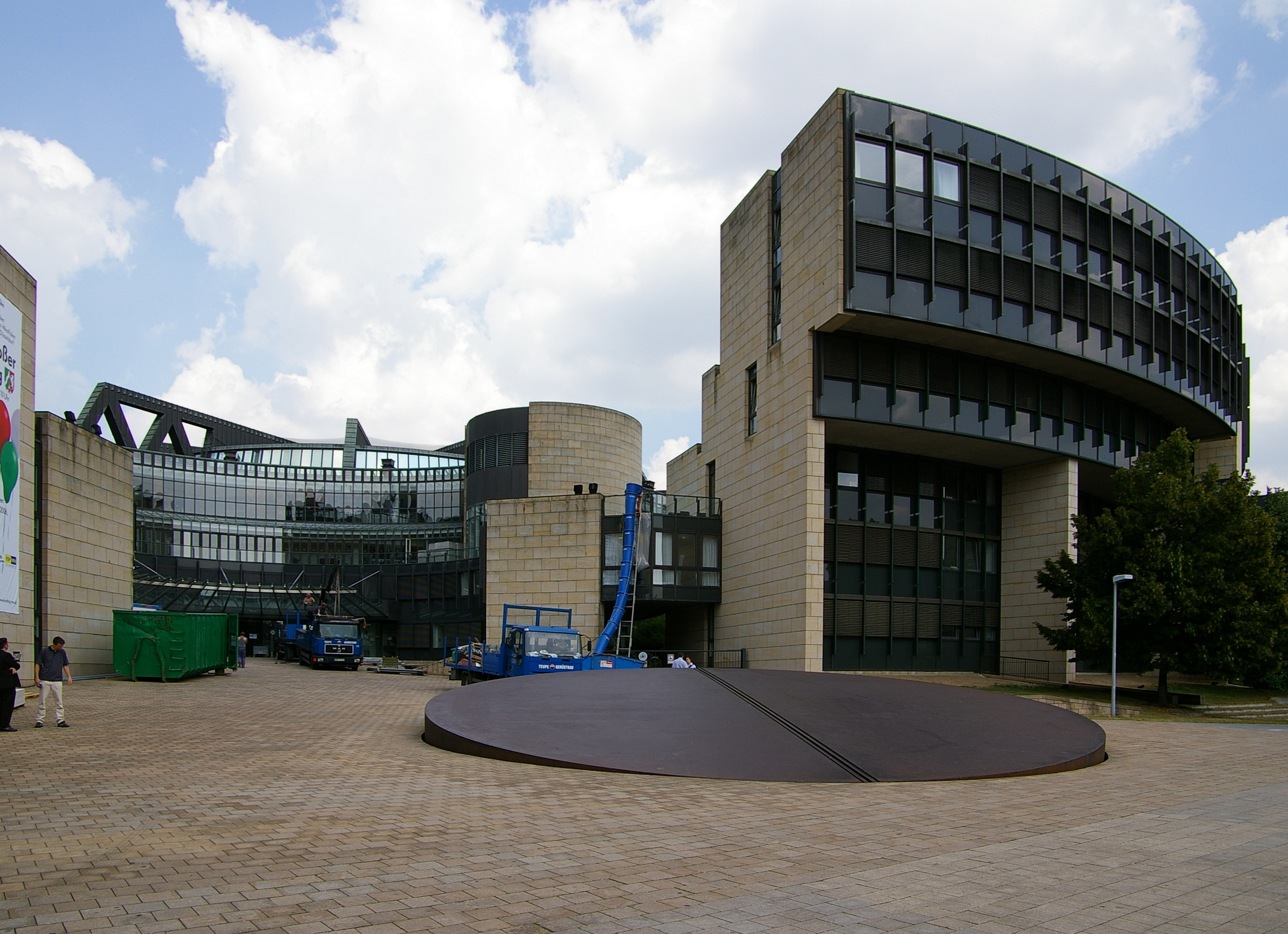
The current regional parliament building

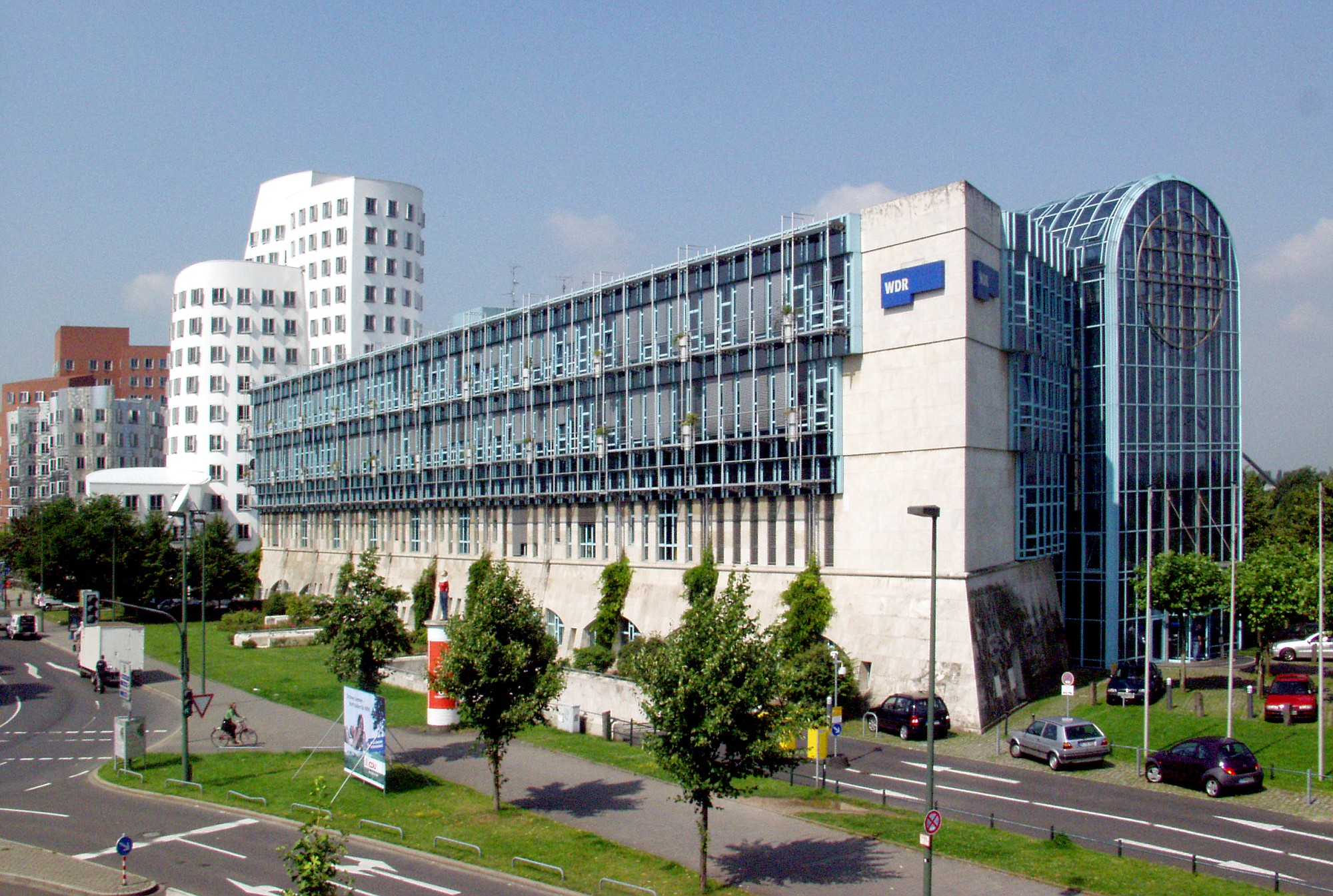
The regional TV and radio broadcaster WDR

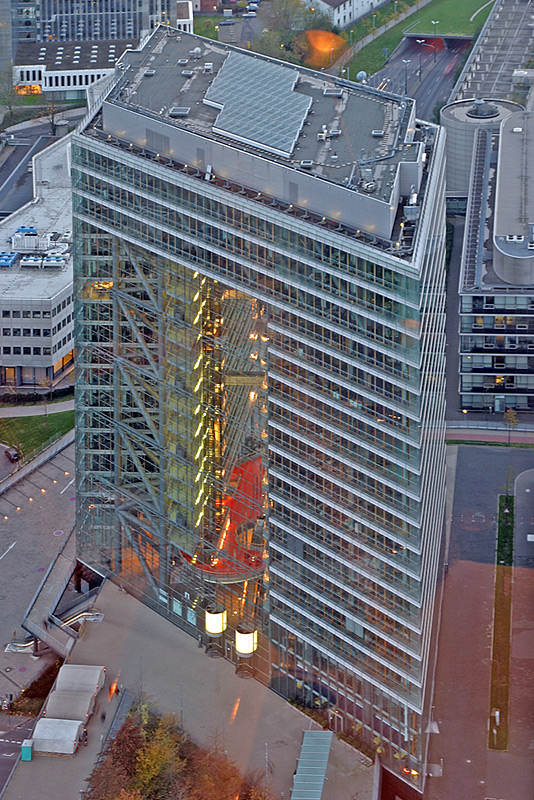
The Stadttor office building that houses the offices of the Prime Minister of North Rhine-Westphalia

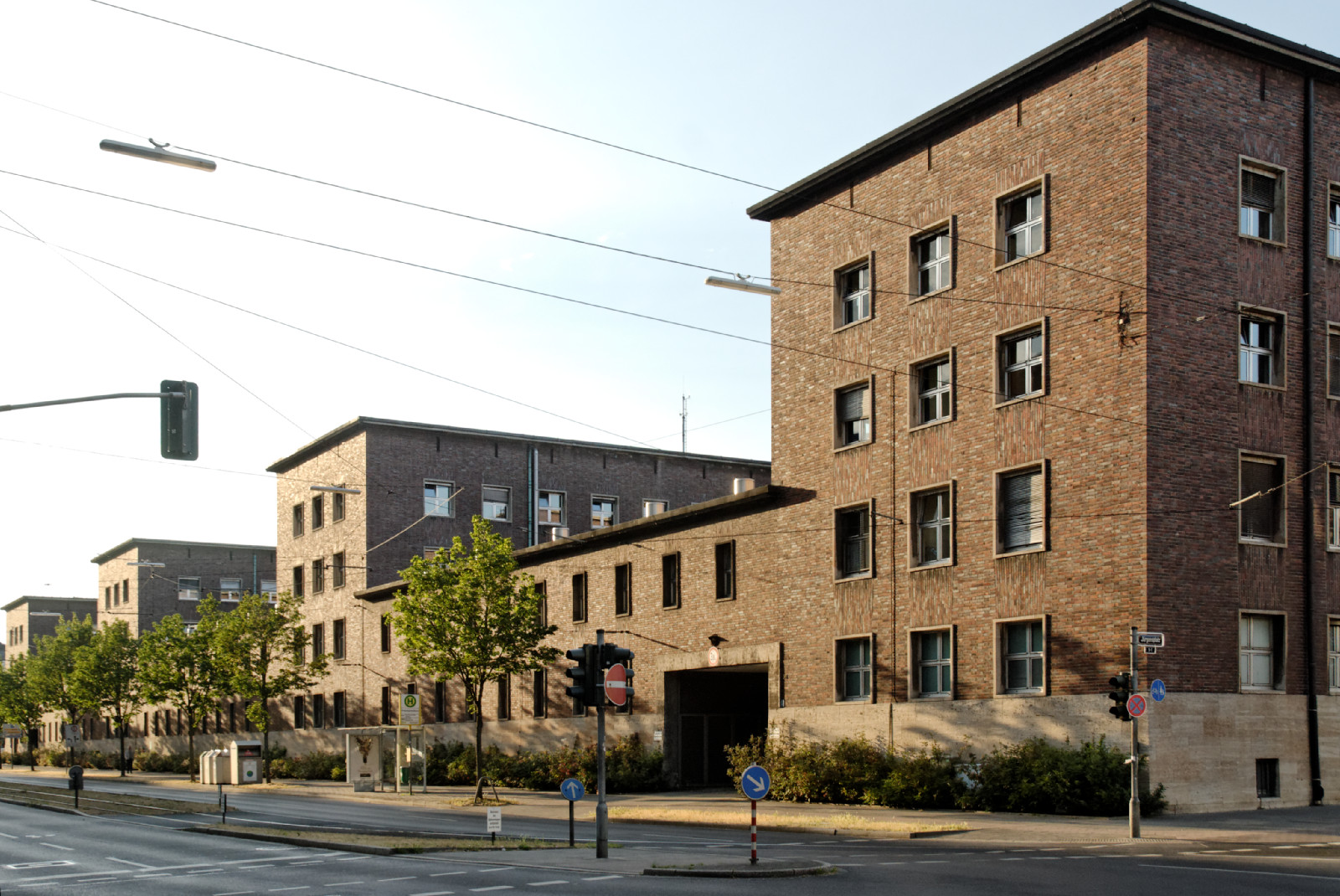
The Düsseldorf police headquarters

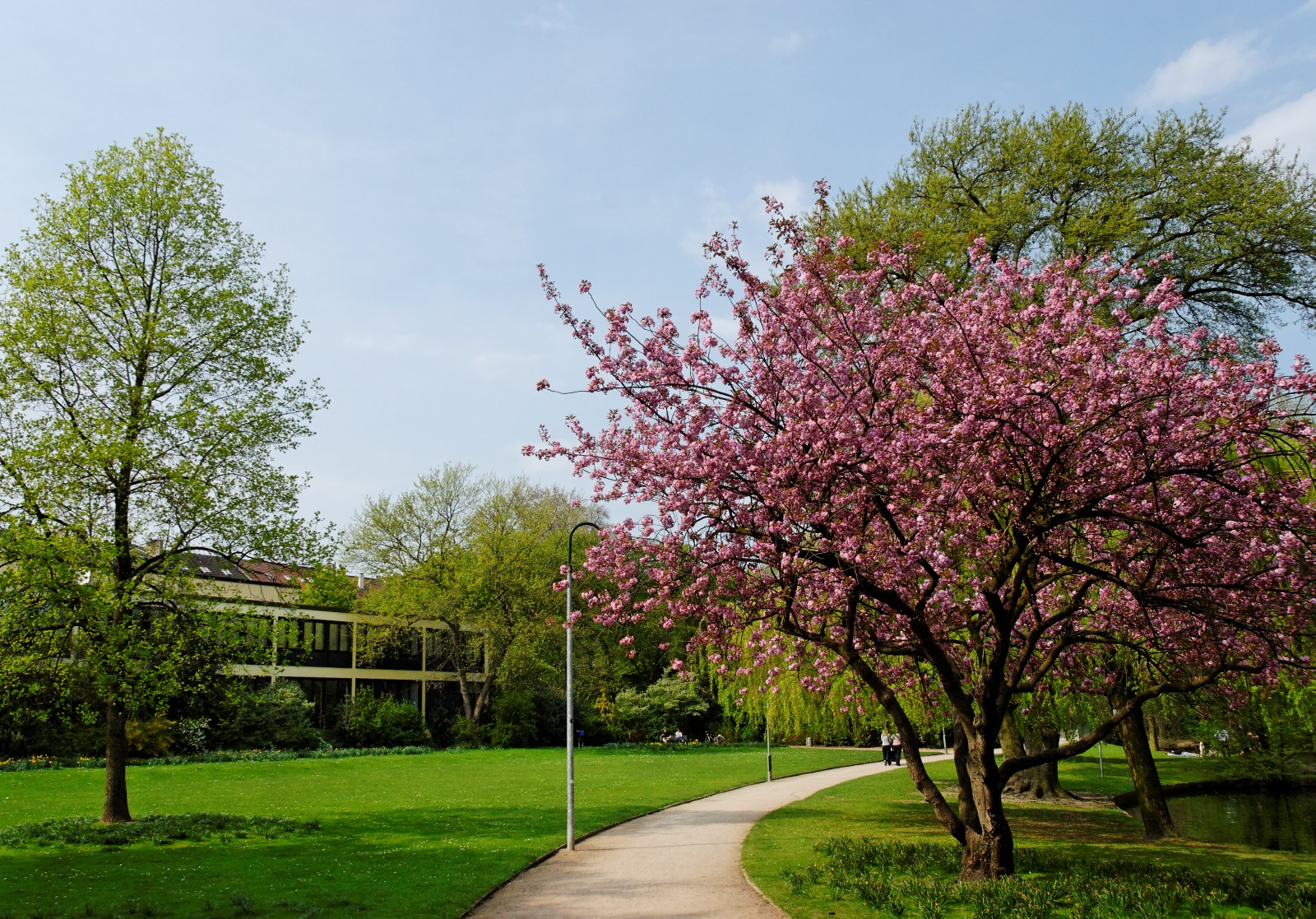
Florapark gardens
