= Düsseldorf-Hafen =

- Stadtteil of Düsseldorf
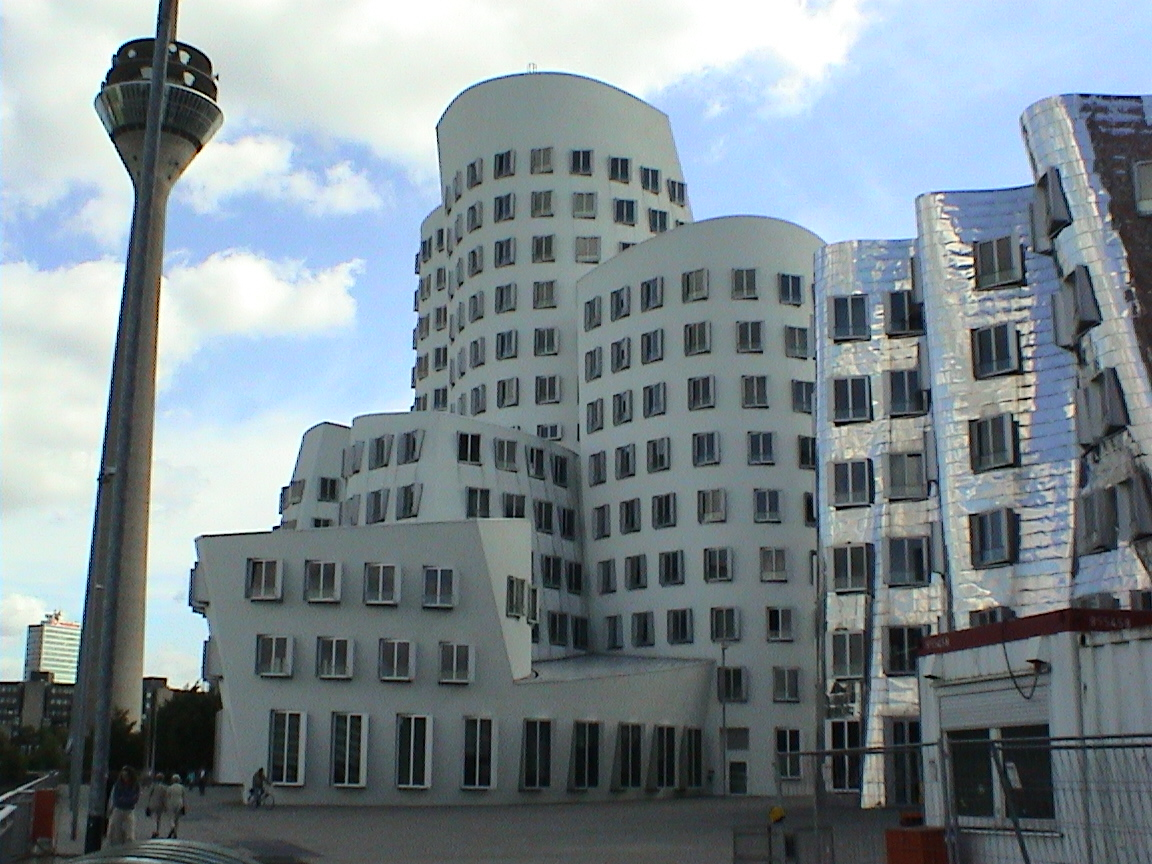
- The Rheinturm tower and Neuer Zollhof buildings

- Map of Düsseldorf, showing Hafen (in red) within Borough 3 (in pink)
- Interactive map of Düsseldorf-Hafen
- Location within Germany Location within North Rhine-Westphalia
- Coordinates: 51°13′09″N 6°45′28″E
- Country: Germany
- State: North Rhine-Westphalia
- District: Urban district
- City: Düsseldorf
- Borough: Borough 3

Area
  - Total: 3.79 km^{2} (1.46 sq mi)

Population (2020-12-31)
  - Total: 110
  - Density: 29/km^{2} (75/sq mi)
- Time zone: UTC+01:00 (CET)
  - Summer (DST): UTC+02:00 (CEST)

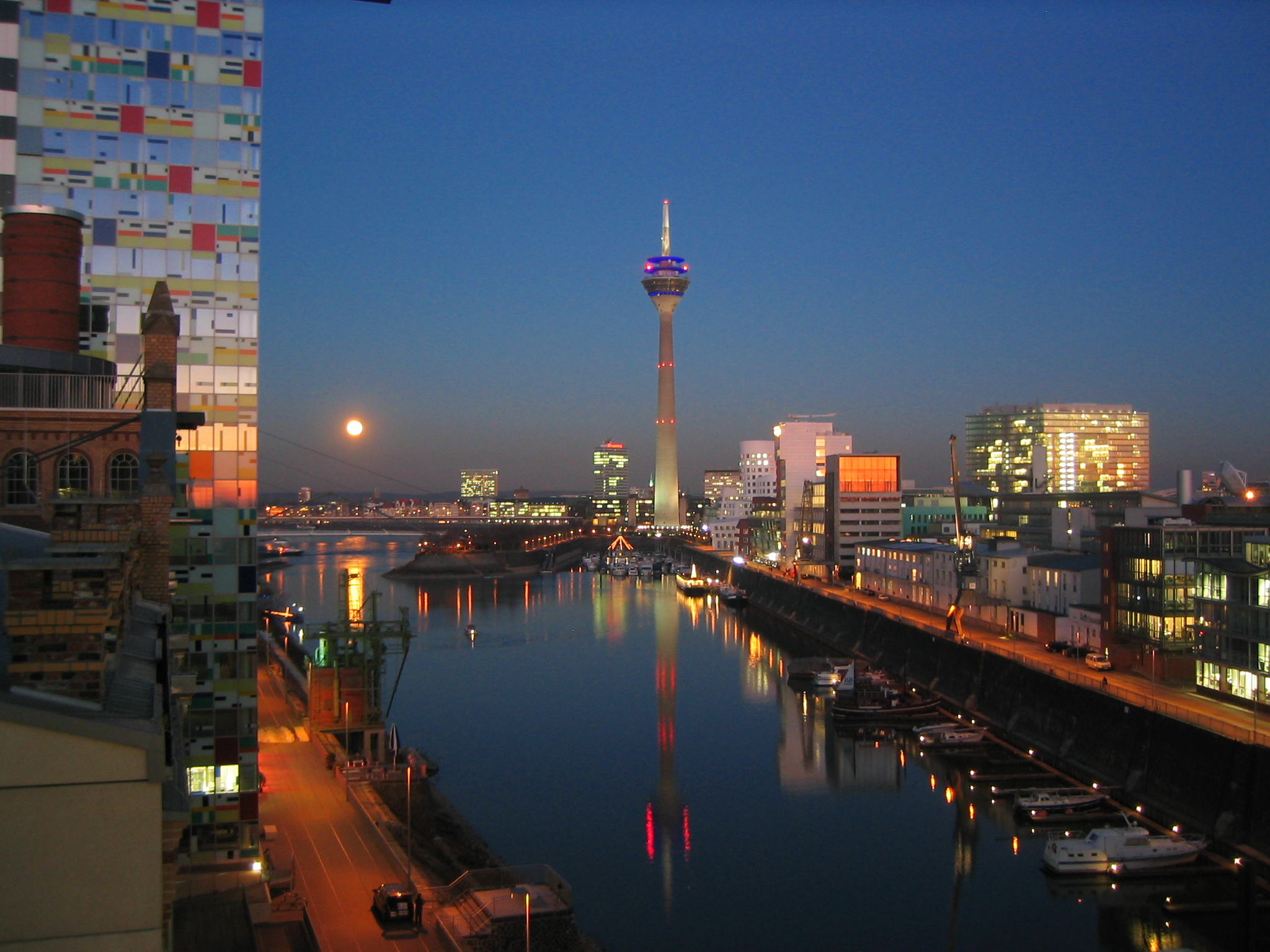
The Media Harbour in Düsseldorf

Düsseldorf-Hafen (German pronunciation: [ˈhaːfn̩], "harbour") is an urban quarter of Düsseldorf, Germany, part of Borough 3, located on the river Rhine and the location of the city's docks.

The quarter covers 3.79 km^{2} (1.46 sq mi), and is predominantly commercial and industrial in nature, with a very small residential population. It had 110 residents in the year 2020, making it the Düsseldorf quarter with the lowest population density.

The docks prospered for decades but lost much of their trade when Mannesmann closed its nearby pipe factory. As a result the eastern part of the docks started to be redeveloped, attracting businesses in the service sector such as media, design and fashion companies. One of the first new residents to the so-called Media Harbour was Westdeutscher Rundfunk with its current affairs TV and radio studios. Düsseldorf local radio station Antenne Düsseldorf is also based in the harbour area. One of the largest cinemas of Düsseldorf is in the Hafen. The Landtag (State parliament) of North Rhine-Westphalia and the Rheinturm are situated right next to the harbour.

Within the Hafen district is the Neuer Zollhof an ensemble of three warped-looking buildings by architect Frank Gehry and other postmodernist buildings. There are also many restaurants, bars, and a few clubs, which make the Hafen a prominent lifestyle district.

The western part of the area still has actively used docks for barges that transport materials on the Rhine. There are plans for further redevelopment with the construction of high end apartment buildings.

In 2003 the port company merged with the port of Neuss on the opposite bank of the Rhine to form Neuss-Düsseldorfer Häfen GmbH & Co. KG.
