= Düsseldorf-Friedrichstadt =

City district of Düsseldorf, Germany

Coordinates: 51°12′44″N 6°46′51″E

Friedrichstadt (German pronunciation: [ˈfʁiːdʁɪçˌʃtat]) is an urban quarter of Düsseldorf, part of Borough 3. It is south of the city centre of Düsseldorf, north of Bilk, west of Oberbilk, and east of Unterbilk. Friedrichstadt has an area of 1.00 km^{2} (0.39 sq mi), and 19,607 inhabitants (2020).

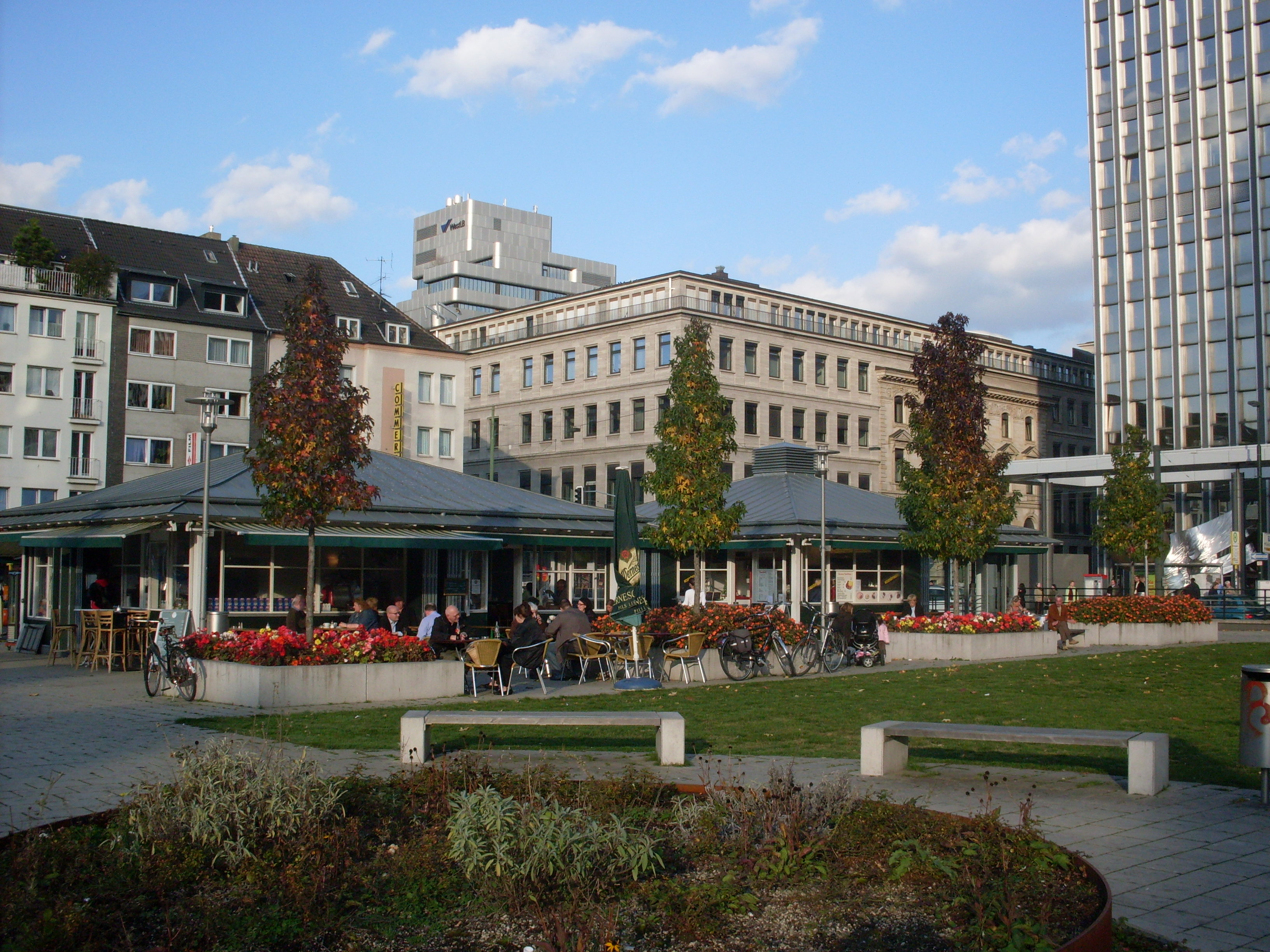
Kirchplatz

map of Düsseldorf, showing Friedrichstadt (in red) within Borough 3 (in pink)

Friedrichstadt was completely planned and constructed in the middle of the 19th century. The construction began in 1854 after it was planned completely in a tesselated paradigm. It was named in honour to King Frederick William IV of Prussia. In the beginning it was a bit swampy, but after a short while it developed well and became a borough mainly for officers and public clerks. Even today in Friedrichstadt many buildings are in the Wilhelminian style.

The idea of the Garden City was another concept proved in Friedrichstadt. The garden architect Maximilian Weyhe designed two parks with ponds in Friedrichstadt. In 1880 the Parliament of the Prussian Rhine Province got its seat in the Ständehaus (House of States) in Friedrichstadt. Until the year 1988 the State Parliament of North Rhine-Westphalia was in the Ständehaus. Actually an Arts museum is in that building.
