= Düsseldorf-Oberbilk station =

Railway station in Düsseldorf, Germany

Düsseldorf Oberbilk
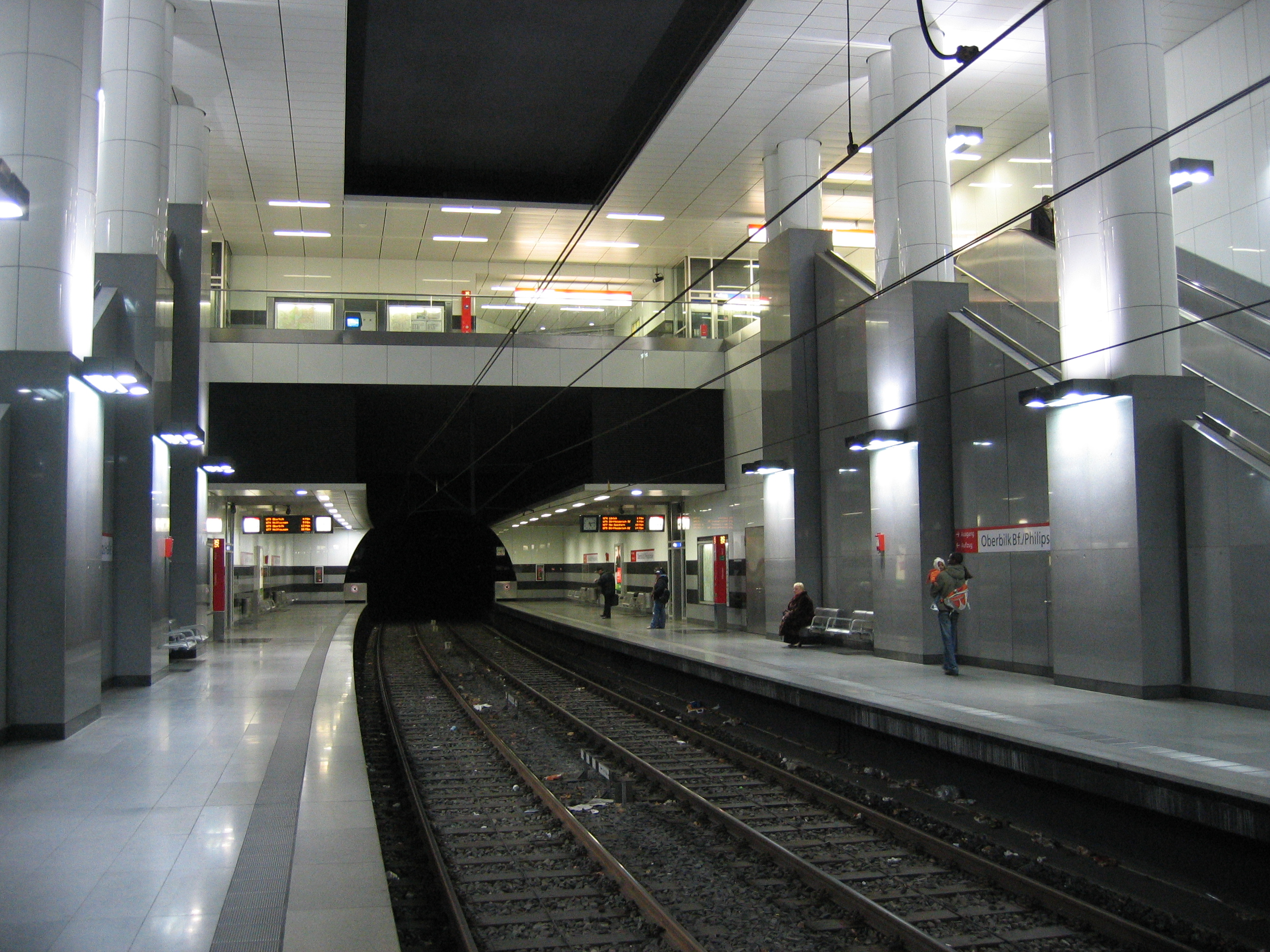

General information
- Location: Düsseldorf, NRW; Germany
- Coordinates: 51°12′29″N 6°48′33″E
- Lines: Cologne–Duisburg (KBS 415); Düsseldorf–Solingen
- Platforms: 2

Construction
- Accessible: Yes

Other information
- Station code: 1416
- DS100 code: KDOB
- IBNR: 8001591
- Category: 5
- Fare zone: VRR: 430; VRS: 1430 (VRR transitional zone)
- Website: www.bahnhof.de

History
- Opened: 1968

Passengers
- 15,000–20,000

Services
Preceding station	Rhine-Ruhr S-Bahn	Following station
Düsseldorf-Eller Mitte towards Solingen Hbf	S1	Düsseldorf Volksgarten towards Dortmund Hbf
Düsseldorf-Eller Süd towards Köln-Nippes	S6	Düsseldorf Volksgarten towards Essen Hbf
Düsseldorf-Eller Süd towards Langenfeld	S68	Düsseldorf Volksgarten towards Wuppertal-Vohwinkel
Preceding station	Rhine-Ruhr Stadtbahn	Following station
Ellerstraße towards Krefeld Rheinstraße	U76	Kaiserslauterner Straße towards Handelszentrum/Moskauer Straße
Ellerstraße towards Duisburg-Meiderich Süd	U79	Kaiserslauterner Straße towards Universität Ost/Botanischer Garten
Location

Düsseldorf-Oberbilk (Oberbilk S for the subway station) is an interchange railway station situated at Oberbilk, Düsseldorf in western Germany. It is served by lines S1, S6, and S68 of the Rhine-Ruhr S-Bahn, by lines U76 and U79 of the Düsseldorf Stadtbahn (light rail), and by tram line 701.
