= Oberbilk =

City district of Düsseldorf, Germany

Coordinates: 51.216°N 6.804°E

Map of Düsseldorf, showing Oberbilk (in red) within Borough 3 (in pink)

Oberbilk (German pronunciation: [ˈoːbɐbɪlk], lit. 'Upper Bilk', in contrast to "Lower Bilk") is an inner-city urban quarter in the south-east of the German city of Düsseldorf. The back exit of the Central Station leads to Oberbilk. The new District Court of Düsseldorf is located in Oberbilk since 2010, as is the main office of the Communal Library of Düsseldorf. Oberbilk is also home to the Mitsubishi Electric Halle, a concert arena with a capacity for 7,500.

Oberbilk has a high population density, with 31,179 people (2020) living in just 3.94 km^{2}. 36.6% are non-German, which is higher than the 23.6% found in Düsseldorf as a whole.

Traditionally Oberbilk was a working class borough containing heavy industry. This changed in the 1980s and, following restructuring, employment is now dominated by the third sector. Unemployment is high.

== Geography ==
Oberbilk lies to the south-east of the Central Station and borders on Stadtmitte, Bilk, Flingern, Lierenfeld and Wersten.

== Public transport ==
In Oberbilk there are five underground lines, leading in one direction to the south of Düsseldorf, in the other direction to the Central District and the northern and western boroughs of the city. There are also metro lines to the neighboring cities of Duisburg and Meerbusch.

Düsseldorf-Oberbilk station connects it with the Central Station, the International Airport, other parts of Düsseldorf, Cologne, Leverkusen, Solingen, Ratingen Ost, Duisburg, Mülheim and Essen.

There are two tram lines and some bus lines as well.

== History ==
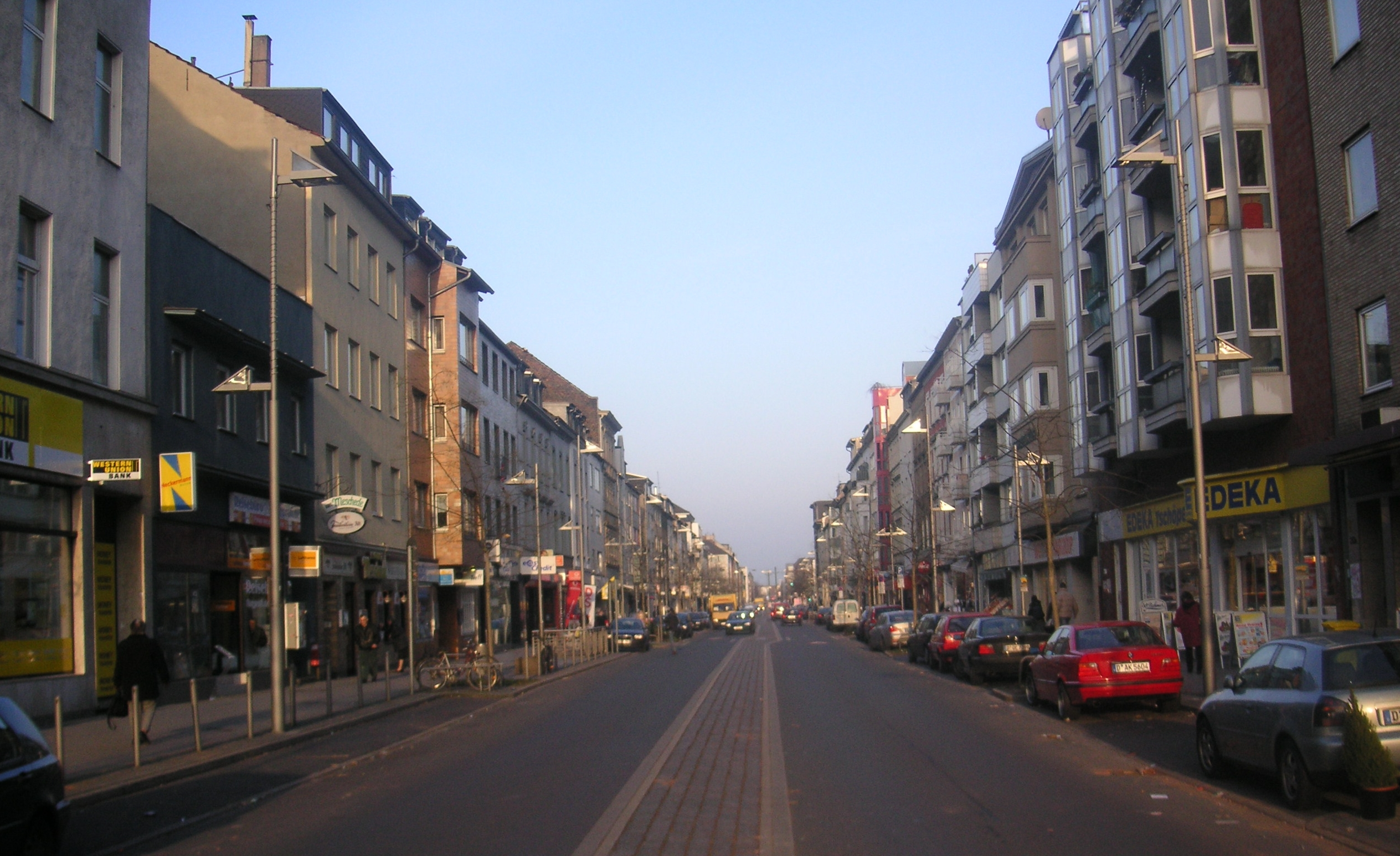
Kölner Straße

Oberbilk was a part of Bilk from 1384. There were only a few farms then and agriculture dominated until 1838 when the Düsseldorf–Elberfeld railway was built through Oberbilk; the Cologne-Minden railway followed in 1845.

With good railway connections to the coal mines of the Ruhr area, the steel industry built factories in Oberbilk, starting in 1852 with the Belgian Richard Brothers' Pudelstahlwerk. The industrial dynasty of Poensgen settled in Oberbilk in the 1860s.

The main part of Oberbilk was industrial or basic housing for the workers until the Second World War, when much of it was destroyed. Until the 1970s, when the war damage was repaired, restoration was piecemeal and rents in Oberbilk, especially its central district, were very low, in contrast to most other parts of Düsseldorf. This attracted immigrants and vice, with some brothels operating in the borough.

Oberbilk had three cinemas, a department store and a lot of small shops, but in the past many in Düsseldorf used to regard it as a problem area. In the 1980s the last industrial jobs left.

== Restructuring ==
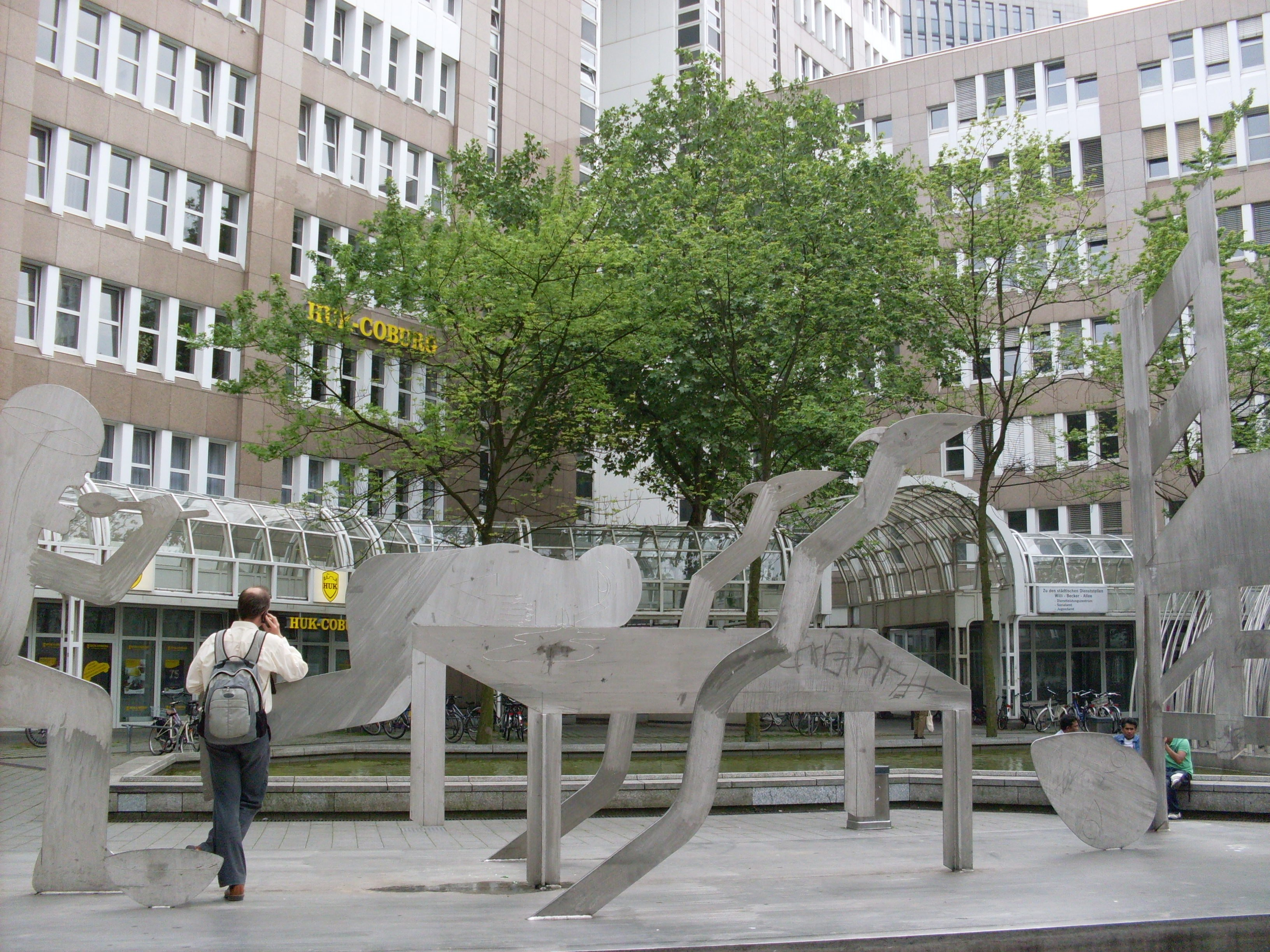
Berta-von-Suttner-Platz

In the late 1970s, restructuring began. After the last steel factory left Oberbilk in 1979, the communal administration planned Oberbilk as a third sector area.

In the 1980s the Central Station of Düsseldorf was renovated, after which the area behind the railway station was planned anew. Insurance offices, the main seat of the Communal Library (Stadtbücherei), the State Court for Labour and Social Law (Landesarbeits und Landessozialgericht) settled in Oberbilk, bringing employment in services. The quality of life is much higher than in the 1980s, but it's still one of the poorer parts of Düsseldorf.
