= Bilk =

City district of Düsseldorf, Germany

Coordinates: 51°12′09″N 6°46′47″E

Map of Düsseldorf, showing Bilk (in red) within Borough 3 (in pink)

Bilk (German pronunciation: [bɪlk]) is a quarter (Stadtteil) of Düsseldorf. Together with Oberbilk, Unterbilk, Hamm, Flehe and Volmerswerth it constitutes Borough 3, which is the most populous borough of Düsseldorf. Bilk has an area of 6.07 km^{2} (2.34 sq mi), and 41,150 inhabitants (2020). Heinrich-Heine-University is in Bilk.

== History ==
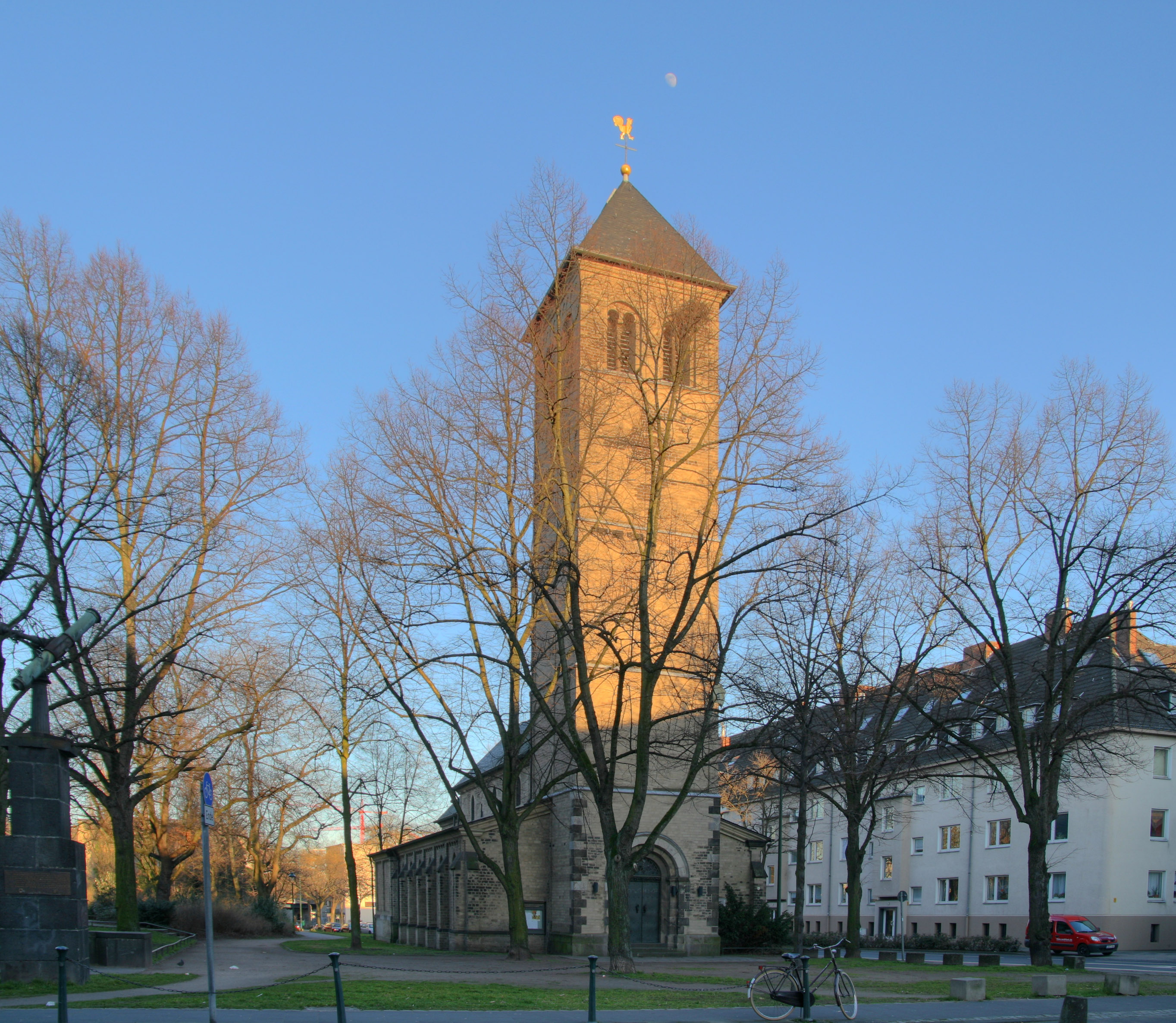
Old Saint Martin Church

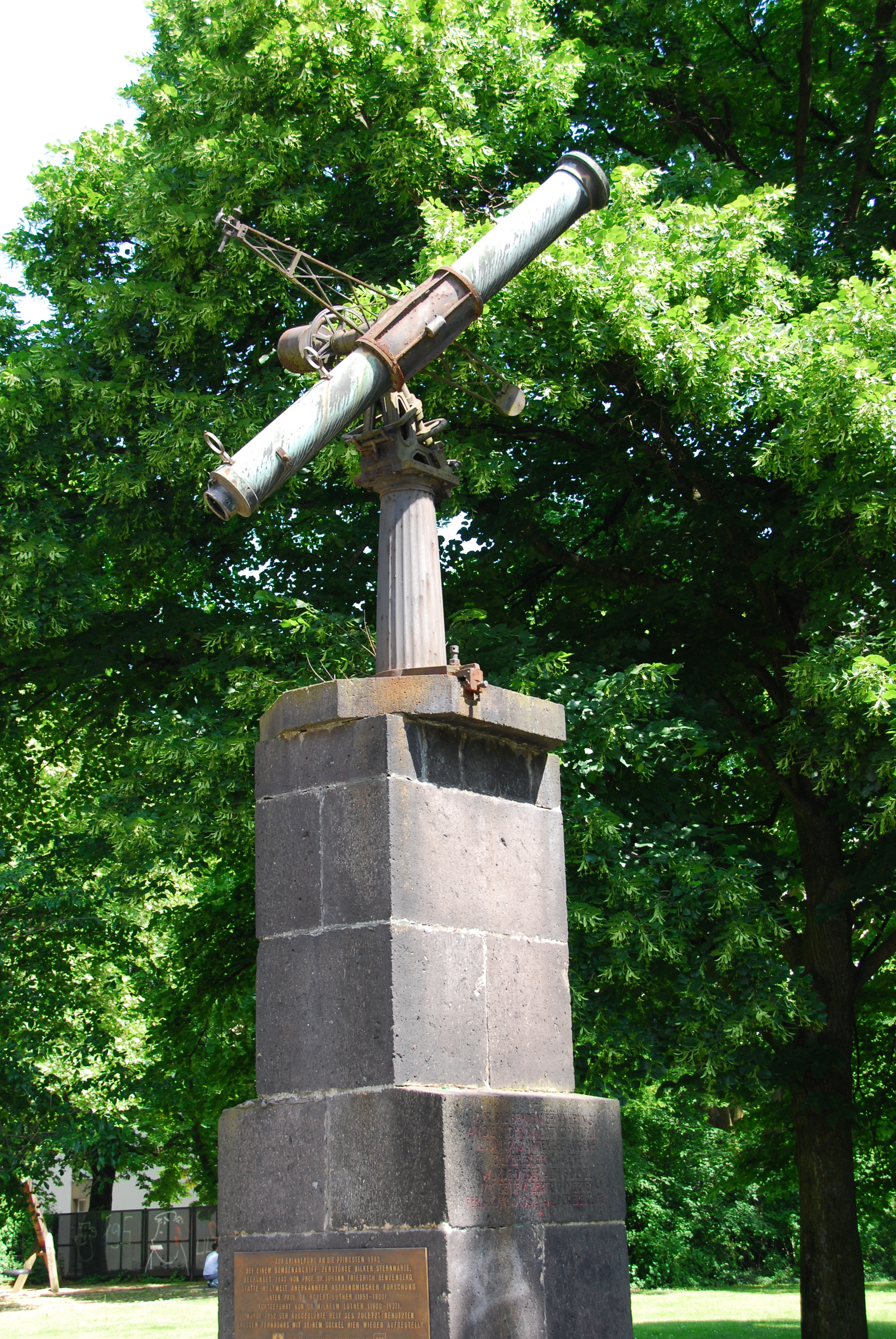
Observatory (Bilker Sternwarte)

The first documentary mention of Bilk is in the year 799. The Old Church is older and seems to be from about 700 A.D., given by Saint Suitbert, but was destroyed by fire about 900, and is mentioned in 1019 for the first time. During the following centuries, the church was reconstructed frequently, especially in the 12th century and the 17th century.

Until the year 1206 the fishing settlement dusseldorp, located to the North of Bilk, belonged to the Bilk parish. After August 14 of 1288 (the Battle of Worringen) Düsseldorf got City Rights, the Old Bilk Church became a city church. In 1380 the County of Berg became the Duchy of Berg, Düsseldorf the capital of a duchy. In 1384 the village of Bilk (south of the Old Bilk Church, which belonged to Düsseldorf from beginning) became part of the city of Düsseldorf.

Starting in 1852 in the South of Düsseldorf there was a growth of factories during the Industrial Revolution. Düsseldorf grew to the south and the traditionally industrial centres of the city are still there today. In 1893 the Hammer Eisenbahnbrücke - a railway bridge across the river Rhine - was finished. Bilk got its own railway station, which today is only a station for regional trains. The Bilk Observatory was founded in 1843 and destroyed by bombing in 1943. In 1852 24 asteroids were found there, called the 24 Düsseldorf planets. The New Harbour of Düsseldorf was built between 1890 and 1896, but after a steel factory closed its production, the port losts its importance. In 1990 a great part of it was closed and filled in. The media industry settled on this land and a cultural centre grew. In 1999 the Gehry buildings completed the new assemble.

== Infrastructure ==
Düsseldorf-Bilk station is now served only by the Rhine-Ruhr S-Bahn (slow regional trains) and is connected by the lines S 8, S 11 and S 28 to Neuss, Mönchengladbach, Kaarst, Wuppertal, Hagen, Erkrath, Mettmann, Dormagen, Cologne and other parts of Düsseldorf (Central station, Düsseldorf-Gerresheim,...).

Tram lines connect Bilk with the central district of Düsseldorf and a lot of other districts, especially with the south of the city, Neuss, Ratingen, and the university. Also, bus lines connect Bilk with other parts of the city and the neighboring towns.

== Buildings and attractions ==
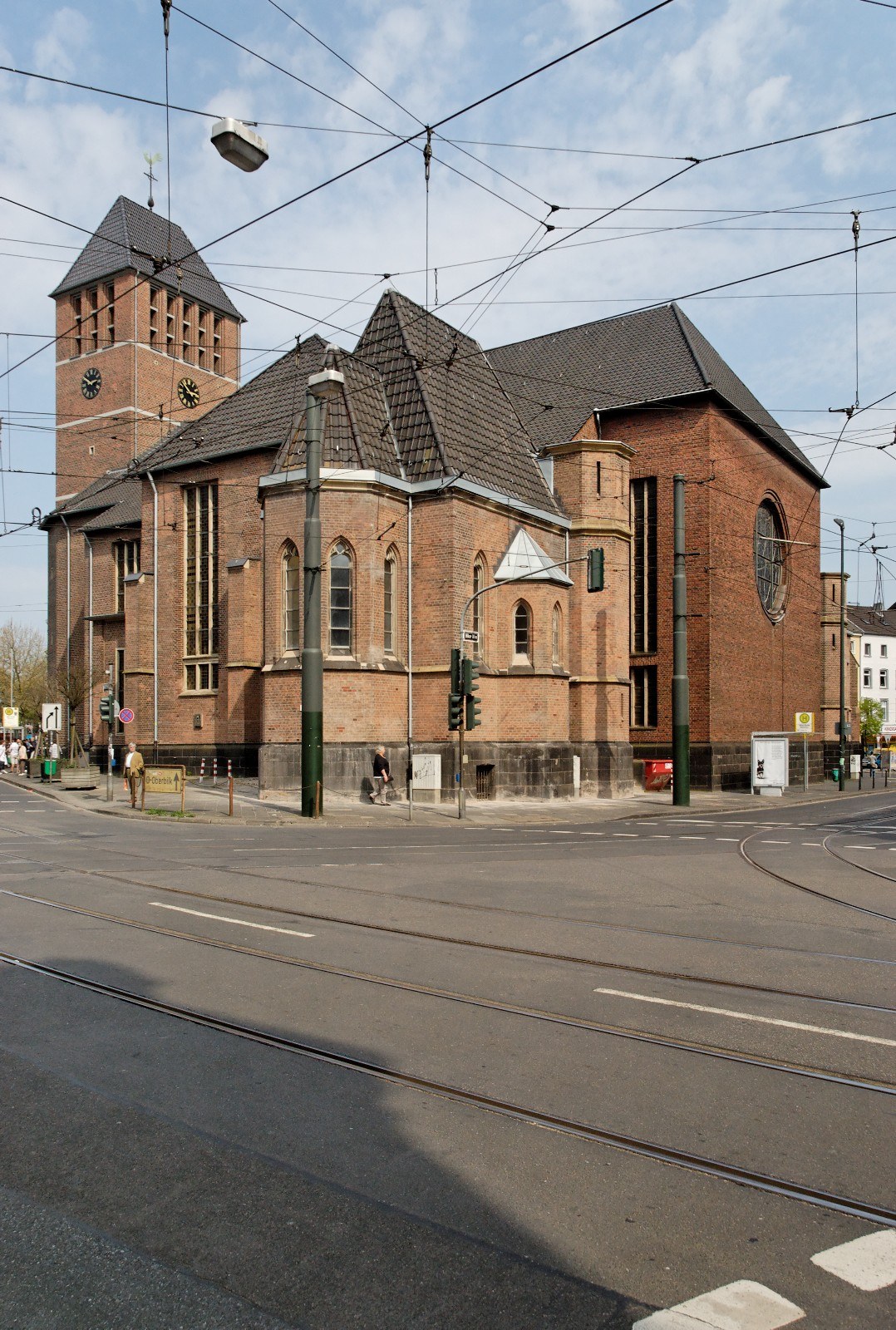
Saint Martin

- Alte Bilker Kirche (Old Saint Martin Church), oldest building in Düsseldorf
- Bilker Kirche (Saint Martin Church)
- Polizeipräsidium (1929–1932) and Oberfinanzdirektion (1929–1939)
- Rheinturm (high 240,5 m)
- Düsseldorfer Stadttor (won some architecture awards)
- K21 - Kunstsammlung Nordrhein-Westfalen
- Botanic Garden Düsseldorf
- Gehry buildings in the Harbour

== Famous people who lived in Bilk ==
- Johann Friedrich Benzenberg (1777–1846), astronomer
- Ferdinand Freiligrath (1810–1876)
- Maria Melos (1820–1888)
- Ferdinand Lassalle (1825–1864), one of the founders of the Social Democratic Party of Germany
- Heinrich Spoerl (1887–1955), writer and his son Alexander Spoerl (1917–1978), writer
- Jakob Salentin von Zuccalmaglio (1775–1838), jurist
- Heino (1938)

== Literature ==
- Udo Achten (Hrsg.): Düsseldorf zu Fuß, 17 Stadtteilrundgänge durch die Geschichte und Gegenwart. 1. Aufl., VSA-Verlag, Hamburg 1989
- Karl Endmann: Düsseldorf und seine Eisenbahnen in Vergangenheit und Gegenwart. 2. Aufl., Motorbuch Verlag, Stuttgart 1987
- Oswald Gerhard und Wilhelm Kleeblatt (Hrsg.): Düsseldorfer Sagen aus Stadt und Land. Werkgetreue Neuausgabe von 1926, Verlag der Goethe-Buchhandlung, Düsseldorf 1982
- Karl Emerich Krämer: Durchs Düsseltal nach Düsseldorf. 1. Aufl., Mercator-Verlag Gert Wohlfahrt, Duisburg/München 1968
- Sonja Schürmann: Düsseldorf, Eine moderne Landeshauptstadt mit 700jähriger Geschichte und Kultur. 1. Aufl., DuMont Kunst-Reiseführer, Köln 1988
- Hermann Smeets: Villa Bilici. Düsseldorf-Bilk früher und heute. 1. Aufl., herausgegeben von der Stadt-Sparkasse Düsseldorf, Triltsch Druck und Verlag, Düsseldorf 1983
- Hugo Weidenhaupt: Kleine Geschichte der Stadt Düsseldorf. 4. Aufl., Verlag L. Schwann, Düsseldorf 1968
