= Boroughs of Düsseldorf =

The City of Düsseldorf consists of 50 city parts (Stadtteile), which are collected into 10 boroughs (Stadtbezirke). Every district has its own local assembly (local parliament Bezirksvertretung) and its own borough mayor (Bezirksbürgermeister). The Bezirksvertretungen have only advisory roles, they do not have their own budgets. Borough 4 is the only borough on the west side of the Rhine.

== Overview ==
Borough 1 (Stadtbezirk 1) Altstadt, Carlstadt, Derendorf, Golzheim, Pempelfort, Stadtmitte Borough 2 (Stadtbezirk 2) Düsseltal, Flingern-Nord, Flingern-Süd Borough 3 (Stadtbezirk 3) Bilk, Flehe, Friedrichstadt, Hafen, Hamm, Oberbilk, Unterbilk, Volmerswerth Borough 4 (Stadtbezirk 4) Heerdt, Lörick, Niederkassel, Oberkassel Borough 5 (Stadtbezirk 5) Angermund, Kaiserswerth, Kalkum, Lohausen, Stockum, Wittlaer	Borough 6 (Stadtbezirk 6) Lichtenbroich, Mörsenbroich, Rath, Unterrath Borough 7 (Stadtbezirk 7) Gerresheim, Grafenberg, Hubbelrath, Knittkuhl, Ludenberg Borough 8 (Stadtbezirk 8) Eller, Lierenfeld, Unterbach, Vennhausen Borough 9 (Stadtbezirk 9) Benrath, Hassels, Himmelgeist, Holthausen, Itter, Reisholz, Urdenbach, Wersten Borough 10 (Stadtbezirk 10) Garath, Hellerhof
