= Wersten =

Düsseldorf-Wersten
- Stadtteil of Düsseldorf
- Map of Düsseldorf, showing Wersten (in red) within Borough 9 (in pink)
- Interactive map of Düsseldorf-Wersten
- Location within Germany Location within North Rhine-Westphalia
- Coordinates: 51°10′54″N 6°48′59″E
- Country: Germany
- State: North Rhine-Westphalia
- District: Urban district
- City: Düsseldorf
- Borough: Borough 9

Area
  - Total: 4.42 km^{2} (1.71 sq mi)

Population (2020-12-31)
  - Total: 27,151
  - Density: 6,140/km^{2} (15,900/sq mi)
- Time zone: UTC+01:00 (CET)
  - Summer (DST): UTC+02:00 (CEST)

Wersten (German pronunciation: [ˈvɛʁstn̩]) is a quarter (Stadtteil) of Düsseldorf located in Borough 9 of the city. It is south of Eller and Oberbilk, east of Bilk, and north of Holthausen. It has an area of 4.42 km^{2} (1.71 sq mi), and 27,151 inhabitants (2020). It has been a part of Düsseldorf since 1909.

== History ==
Wersten was mentioned in writing for the first time in 1063 as 'Werstine'. In 1218 it was mentioned under the name 'Warstein'. In 1360 it was given to the administration of Monheim.

After Napoleon reordered the West of the German-Roman Empire, Wersten acquired part of the Mairie of Benrath, in the Canton Richrath, Arrondissement Düsseldorf.

Later, after the Duchy of Berg fell to Prussia in 1815, Wersten was still part of the Mayoralty of Benrath. In 1909 the citizens of Wersten reached their aim to become a part of Düsseldorf, because in that way they got electricity and city gas a few years earlier than settlements outside of Düsseldorf.

== Sights ==
- Südpark park area former belonging to the Bundesgartenschau (Federal garden exhibition of Germany)
- Roman Catholic Church St. Maria Rosenkranz, neoromanic basilika.
- Roman Catholic Franz-von-Sales-Church, modern church
- Roman Catholic Church St. Maria in den Benden, modern church
- Protestant Stephanuskirche, modern church
- Botanic Garden of Düsseldorf University

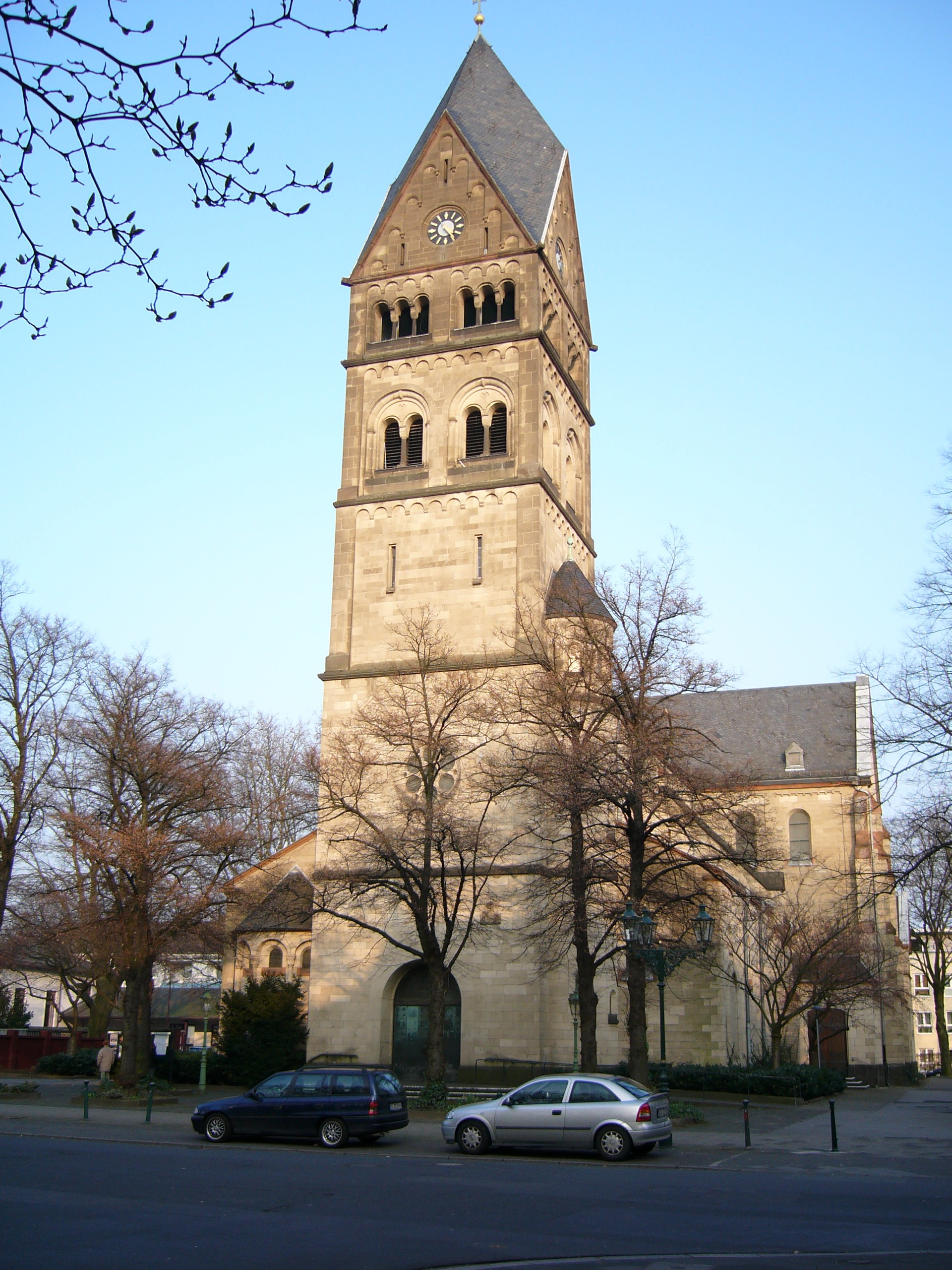
Roman Catholic Church St. Maria Rosenkranz in Wersten

== Infrastructure ==
- Federal Highway connection to the A 46 (Neuss-Düsseldorf-Wuppertal)
- Federal road B 8
- Underground lines U72, U76 and U79
- Bus lines 723, 724, 735, 780, 782 und 785
- Express bus line SB 50

== Economy ==
The Provinzial Insurance Company has its main office in Düsseldorf-Wersten. The rest of the economy in Wersten is based on smaller companies.
