= Düsseldorf-Itter =

Coordinates: 51°09′54″N 6°48′55″E

Map of Düsseldorf, showing Itter (in red) within Borough 9 (in pink)

Itter (German pronunciation: [ˈɪtɐ]) is an urban quarter of Düsseldorf, part of Borough 9. It is located near to the river Rhine, adjacent to Himmelgeist, Holthausen and Reisholz. Its name comes from the small river called the Itter. Itter has an area of 2.58 km^{2} (1.00 sq mi), and 2,411 inhabitants (2020).

== History ==
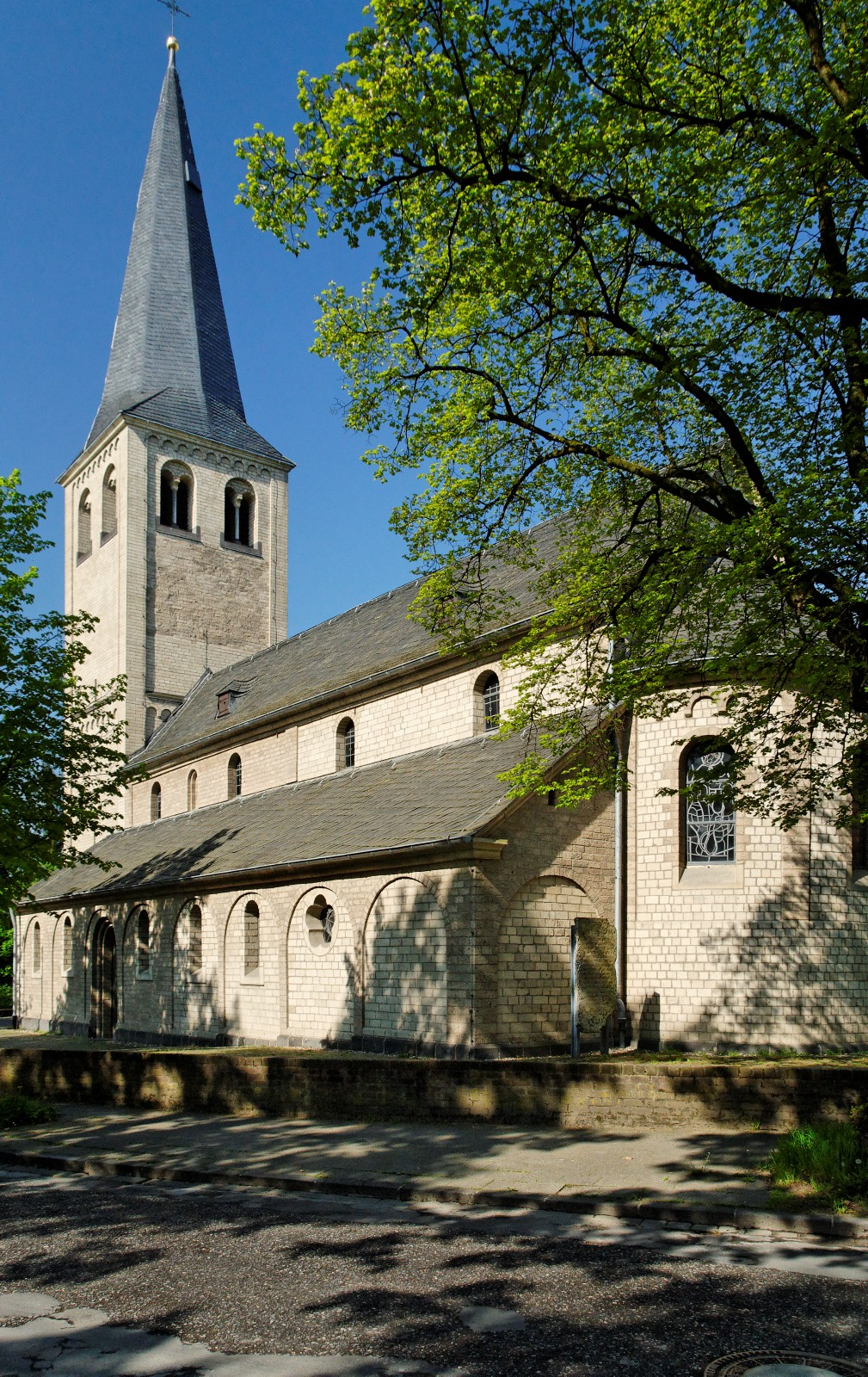
St Hubertus

The first written record of Itter was in the 12th century AD The romanesque church of Itter dates the 12th century. From the 12th to 15th centuries Itter belonged to the convent of Kaiserswerth. From the 15th century Itter was an autonomous parish. In 1908 Itter was incorporated into Benrath and in 1929 into Düsseldorf.

== Sights ==
The romanesque church of Itter was constructed in the 12th century. It is still standing, but was enlarged in 1865.

== Infrastructure ==
There are 4 bus lines in Itter, but no tram lines. One freeway - a federal road - goes through Itter.
