= Düsseldorf-Holthausen =

- Stadtteil of Düsseldorf
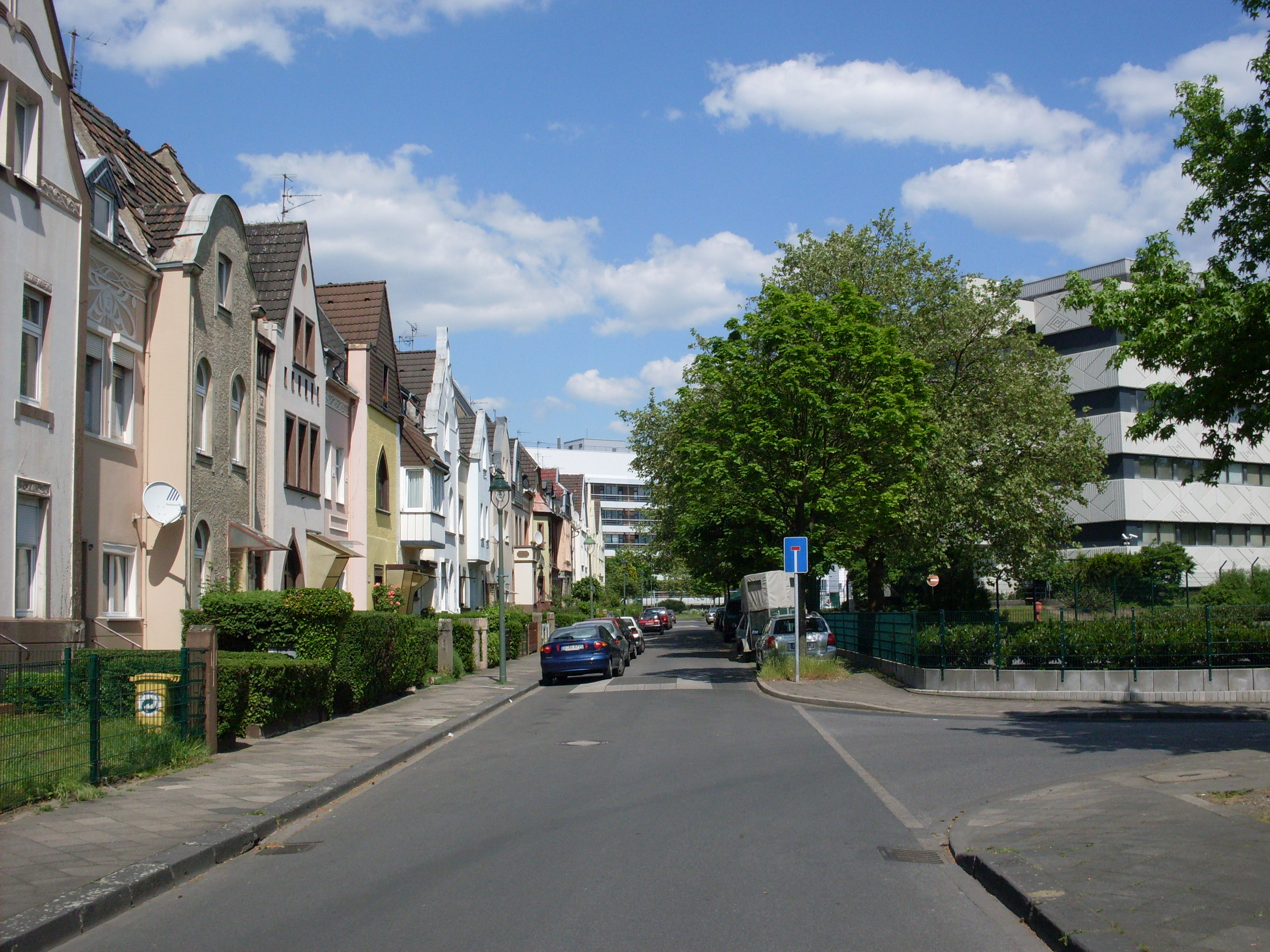

- Map of Düsseldorf, showing Holthausen (in red) within Borough 9 (in pink)
- Interactive map of Düsseldorf-Holthausen
- Location within Germany Location within North Rhine-Westphalia
- Coordinates: 51°10′19″N 6°49′54″E
- Country: Germany
- State: North Rhine-Westphalia
- District: Urban district
- City: Düsseldorf
- Borough: Borough 9
- Founded: 1700

Area
  - Total: 5.35 km^{2} (2.07 sq mi)

Population (2020-12-31)
  - Total: 12,775
  - Density: 2,390/km^{2} (6,180/sq mi)
- Time zone: UTC+01:00 (CET)
  - Summer (DST): UTC+02:00 (CEST)

Holthausen (German pronunciation: [hɔltˈhaʊzn̩]) is an urban quarter of Düsseldorf, part of Borough 9. It is located south of Oberbilk, west of Reisholz, north of Benrath and east of Itter and Himmelgeist. A natural border is the river Rhine. It has an area of 5.35 km^{2} (2.07 sq mi), and 12,775 inhabitants (2020).

Holthausen's history is connected to the history of Itter, Himmelgeist, Benrath, Wersten and Bilk. Until the 18th century its name was Langenweyer. First settlements in that area were formed in the 9th century before Christ, with continuous settlements existing since the 2nd century after Christ. The name Holthausen was mentioned first time about 1700. Until the beginning of the industrial revolution, Holthausen was a small village. It changed after the Henkel Company opened its headquarters in Holthausen. In 1823 Holthausen had 322 inhabitants; in 1869 – 384; in 1895 – 556 people lived in Holthausen; 1905 – 1,884 people. Holthausen's population was at its largest in 1969 – 15,000 inhabitants. Around 12,000 people live there today.

From 1909 to 1929 Holthausen was a part of Benrath and in 1929 it became part of Düsseldorf.

Holthausen still has some important industrial head offices today, as Henkel is still in Holthausen, right next to the Cognis Group HQ.

There are two underground lines (U74 and U77), two tram lines (701 and 713) as well as the bus lines (724, 789, 817, 835 and NE7) in Holthausen. Holthausen is connected to the federal highway A 46 (Neuss - Düsseldorf - Wuppertal) and the federal road B 8 goes across it.

In the south of Holthausen there is a great forest area, the Heyepark and a sports park.

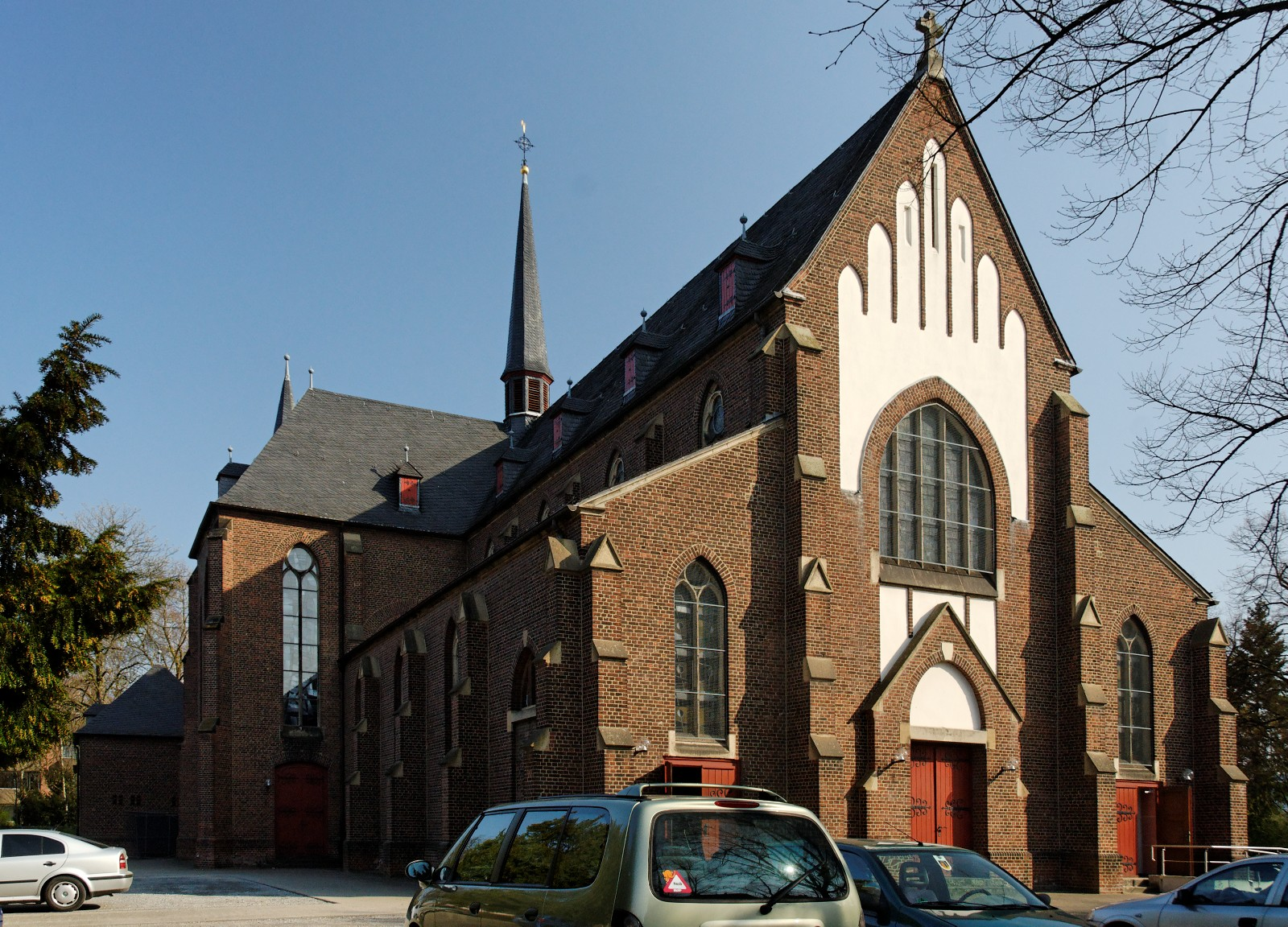
St Joseph (Cath.)

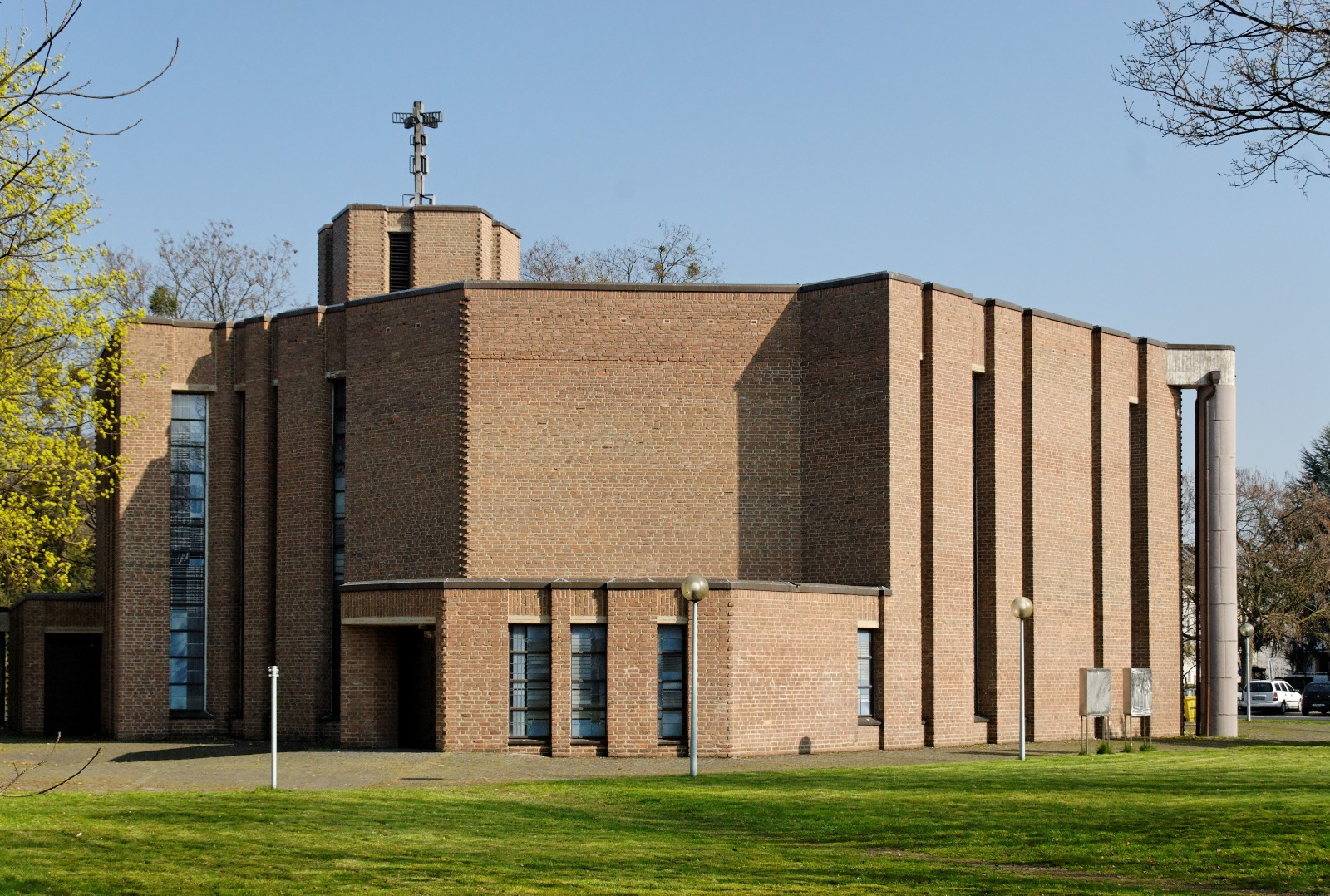
St Laurentius (Cath.)

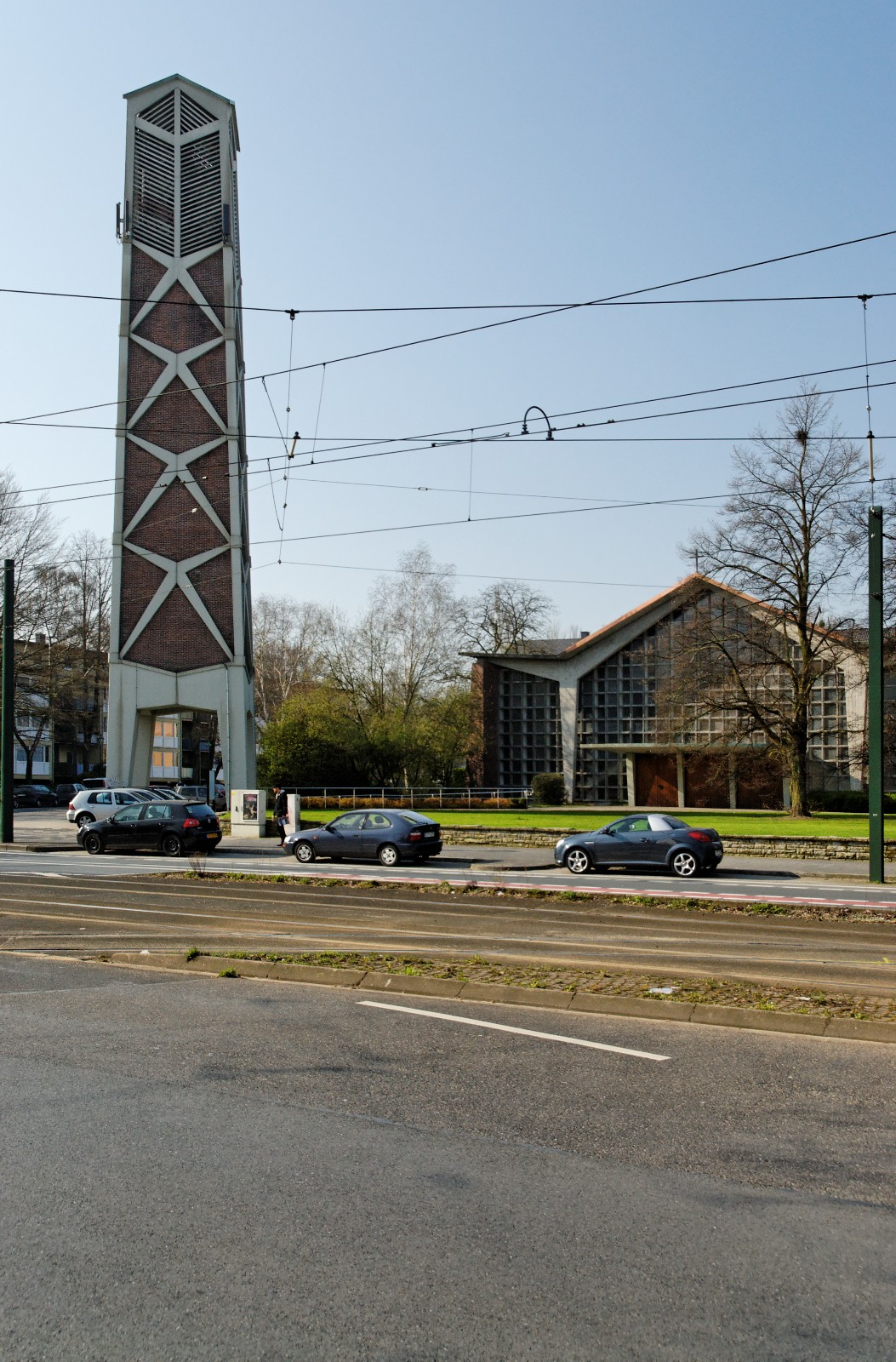
Klarenbach Church (Protestant)

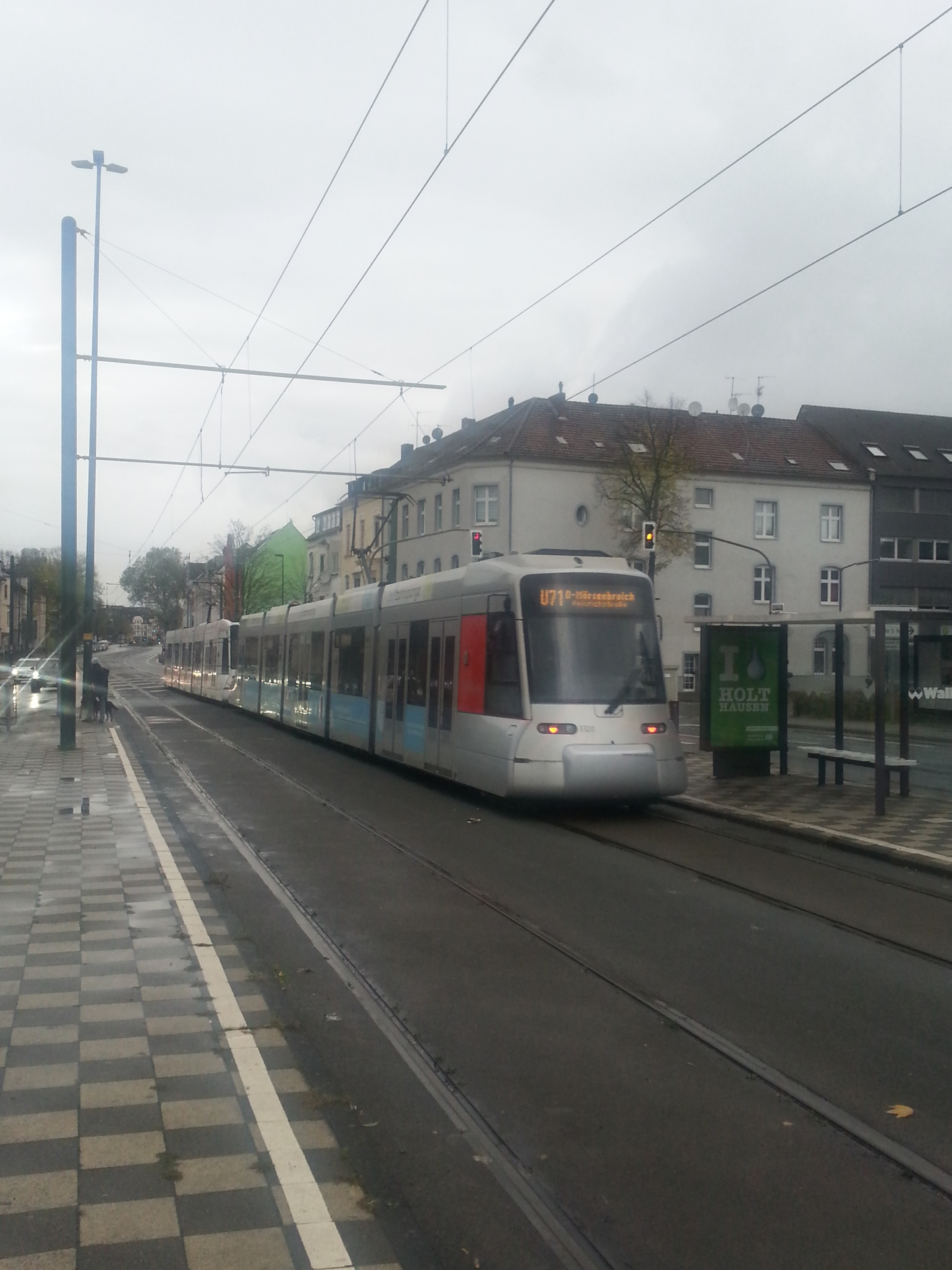
Tram U71 at Düsseldorf Niederheid station
