= Reisholz =

City district of Düsseldorf, Germany

Coordinates: 51°10′35″N 6°51′57″E

Map of Düsseldorf, showing Reisholz (in red) within Borough 9 (in pink)

Reisholz (German pronunciation: [ˈʁaɪsˌhɔlts]) is an urban quarter of Düsseldorf, part of Borough 9. It is located in the south of the city, bordering Holthausen, Benrath, Hassels and the river Rhine. It has an area of 1.85 km^{2} (0.71 sq mi), and 3,753 inhabitants (2020).

Reisholz is an industrial part of the city. Its history started in 1905 by creation of a harbour to the Rhine, a goods station and an industrial area by the Industrie-Terrains Düsseldorf-Reisholz (IDR) company. Many chemical factories, engine building industries, paper mills, petrochemical manufacturers and an oil refinery went to Reisholz. In 1907 the IDR company built a neogothic church, later demolished and replaced by the expanding Henkel Company. Reisholz belonged to Benrath and became a part of Düsseldorf together with Benrath in 1929.

In the harbour of Reisholz there are plans for a new business and living area.

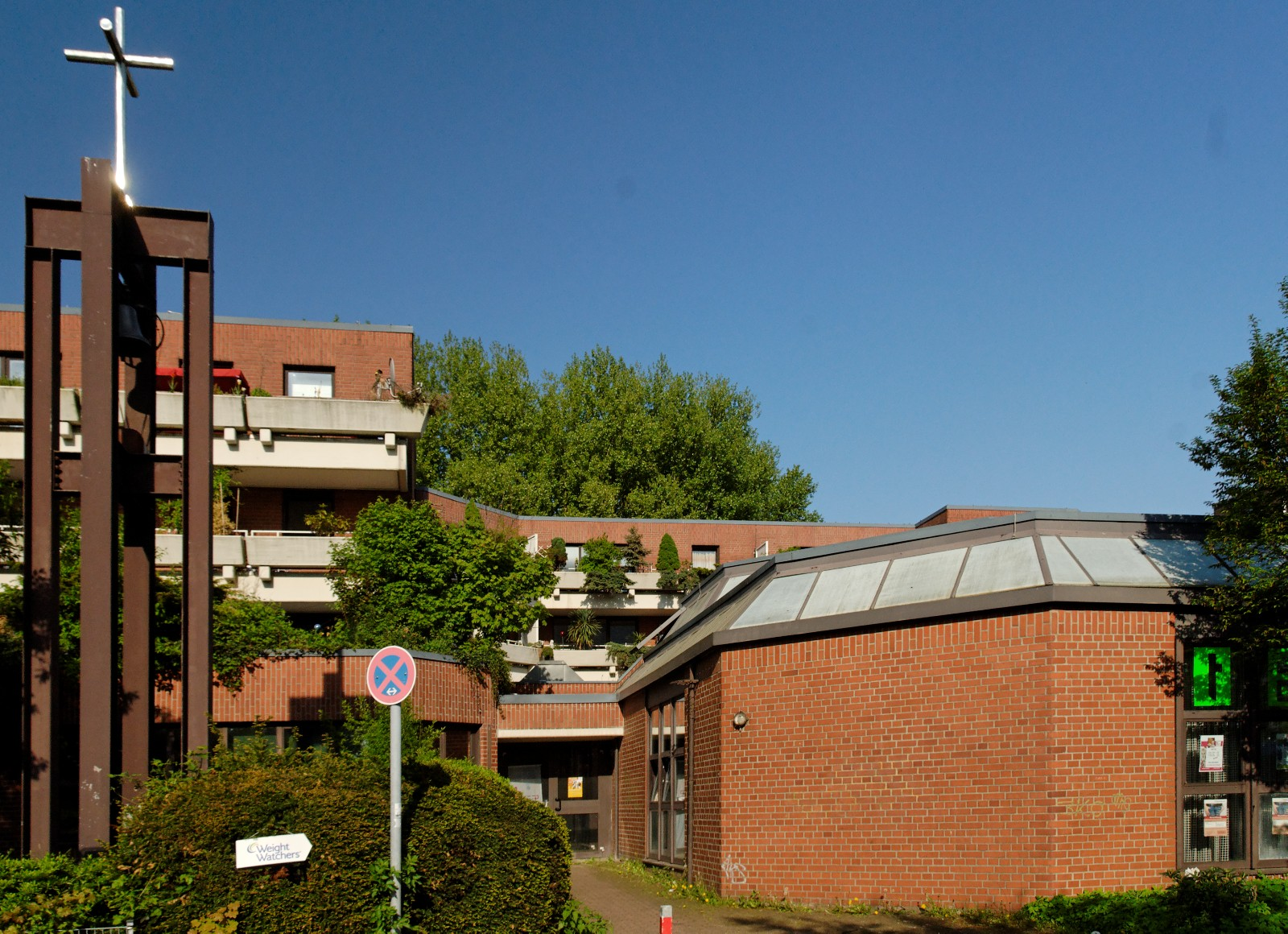
