= Borough 9 (Düsseldorf) =

Stadtbezirk 9
- Borough of Düsseldorf
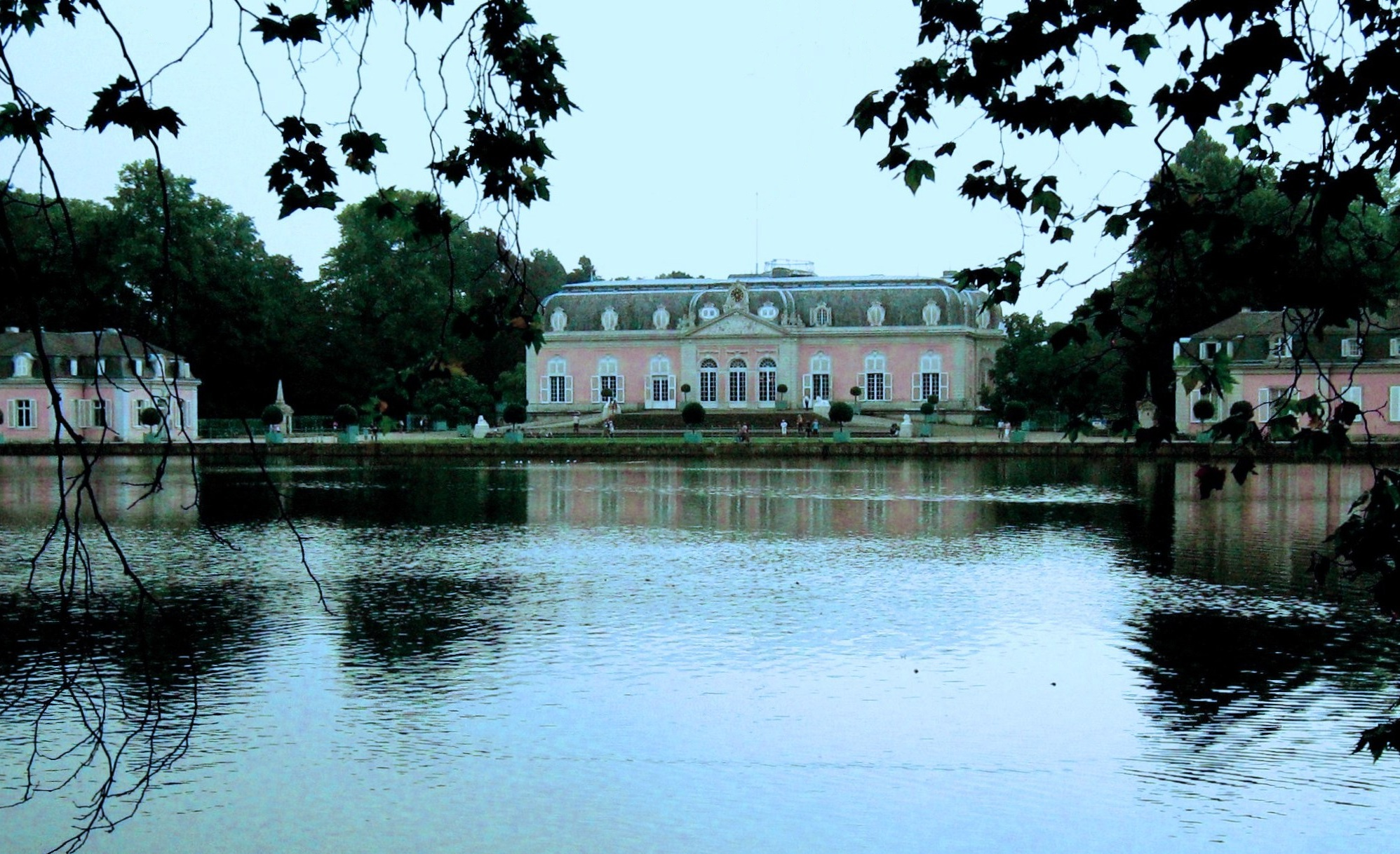
- Park and Schloss Benrath in Düsseldorf-Benrath

- Location of Stadtbezirk 9 within Düsseldorf
- Interactive map of Stadtbezirk 9
- Location within Germany Location within North Rhine-Westphalia
- Coordinates: 51°10′40″N 6°51′28″E
- Country: Germany
- State: North Rhine-Westphalia
- District: Urban district
- City: Düsseldorf
- Subdivisions: 8 quarters

Area
  - Total: 36.57 km^{2} (14.12 sq mi)

Population (2020-12-31)
  - Total: 94,359
  - Density: 2,580/km^{2} (6,683/sq mi)
- Time zone: UTC+01:00 (CET)
  - Summer (DST): UTC+02:00 (CEST)

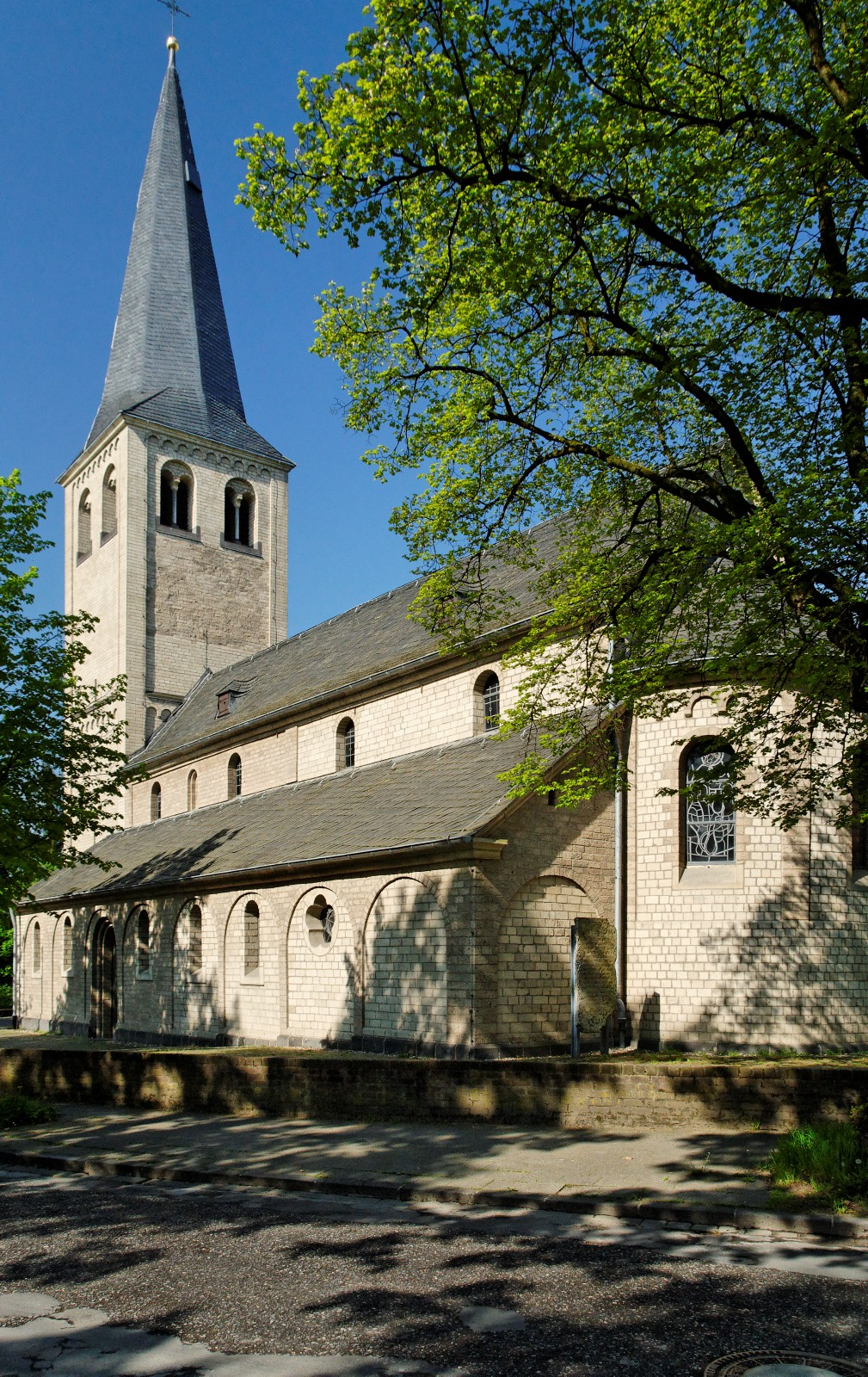
St. Hubertus in Itter

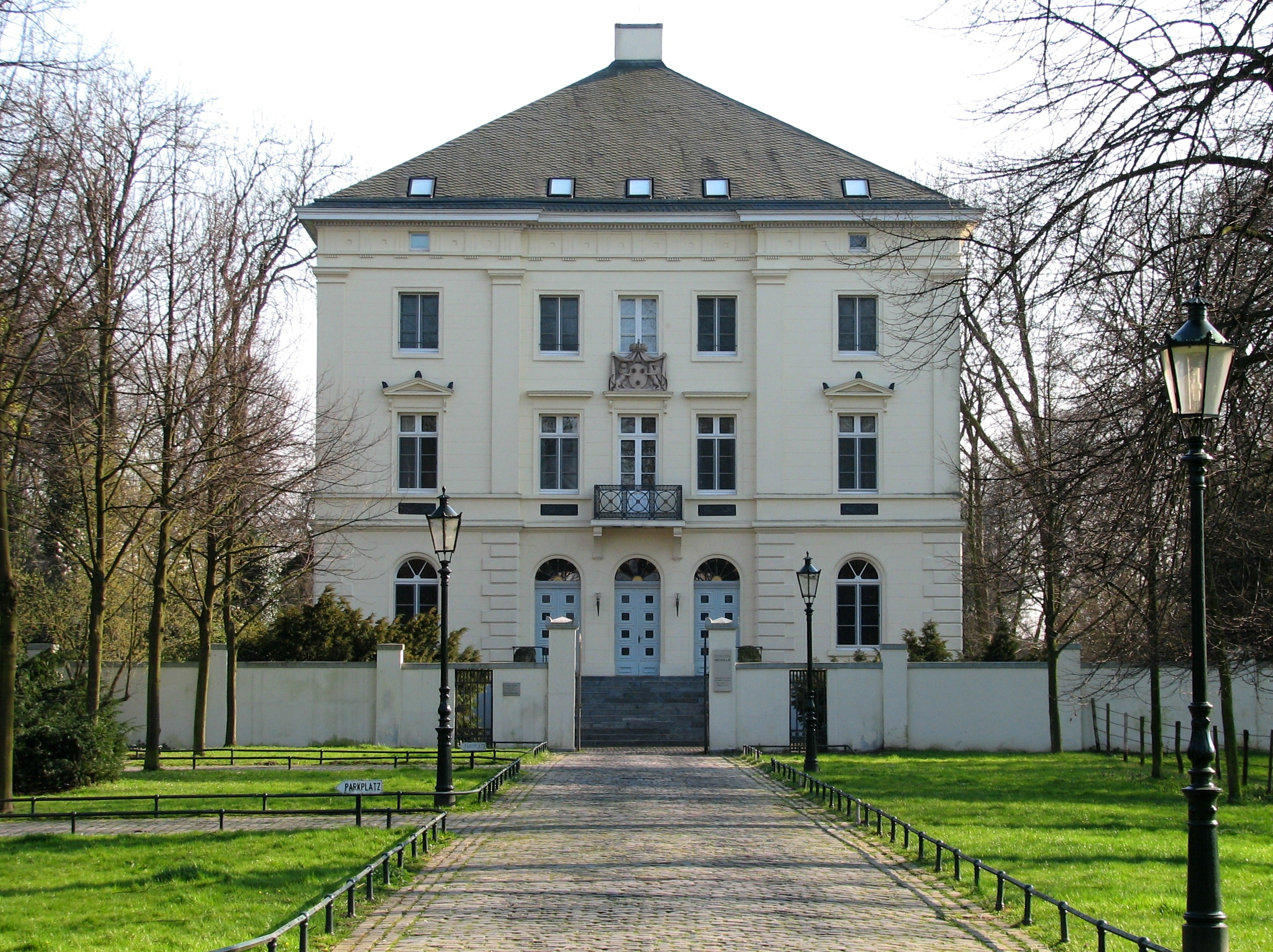
Schloss Mickeln in Himmelgeist

Borough 9 (German: Stadtbezirk 9) is a southern borough of Düsseldorf, the state capital of North Rhine-Westphalia, Germany. The borough covers an area of 36.57 square kilometres and (as of December 2020) has approximately 94,000 inhabitants, making it the city's second most populous borough after Borough 3.

The borough borders Düsseldorf Boroughs 3 and 8 to the north, and 10 to the south. To the east and west the borough borders the rural districts of Mettmann and Rhein-Kreis Neuss respectively.

== Subdivisions ==
Borough 9 is made up of eight Stadtteile (city parts):

#	City part	Population (2020)	Area (km^{2})	Pop. per km^{2}
091	Düsseldorf-Wersten	27,151	4.42	6,101
092	Düsseldorf-Himmelgeist	2,067	4.46	464
093	Düsseldorf-Holthausen	12,775	5.35	2,388
094	Düsseldorf-Reisholz	3,753	1.85	2,040
095	Düsseldorf-Benrath	17,178	5.99	2,858
096	Düsseldorf-Urdenbach	10,559	7.55	1,393
097	Düsseldorf-Itter	2,411	2.58	927
098	Düsseldorf-Hassels	18,465	4.37	4,216

== Places of interest ==
=== Landmarks ===
- Park and Schloss Benrath, Benrath, Park and Castle
- St. Hubertus, Itter, romanesque church from 12th century
- St. Nikolaus, Himmelgeist, romanesque church from 11th century

=== Parks and open spaces ===
- Benrather Wald
- Botanic Garden of Düsseldorf University
- Freizeitpark Niederheid
- Hasseler Forst
- Himmelgeister Rheinbogen
- Park Elbroich
- Schlosspark Benrath
- Südpark
- Urdenbacher Kämpe

== Transportation ==
The borough is served by numerous railway stations and highway. Stations include Düsseldorf-Benrath, Düsseldorf-Reisholz and both Düsseldorf Stadtbahn light rail- and Rheinbahn tram-stations. The borough can also be reached via Bundesautobahn 46 and 59 as well as Bundesstraße 8 and 228.

== See also ==
- Boroughs of Düsseldorf
