= Mickeln House =

Coordinates: 51°9′58″N 6°48′25.50″E

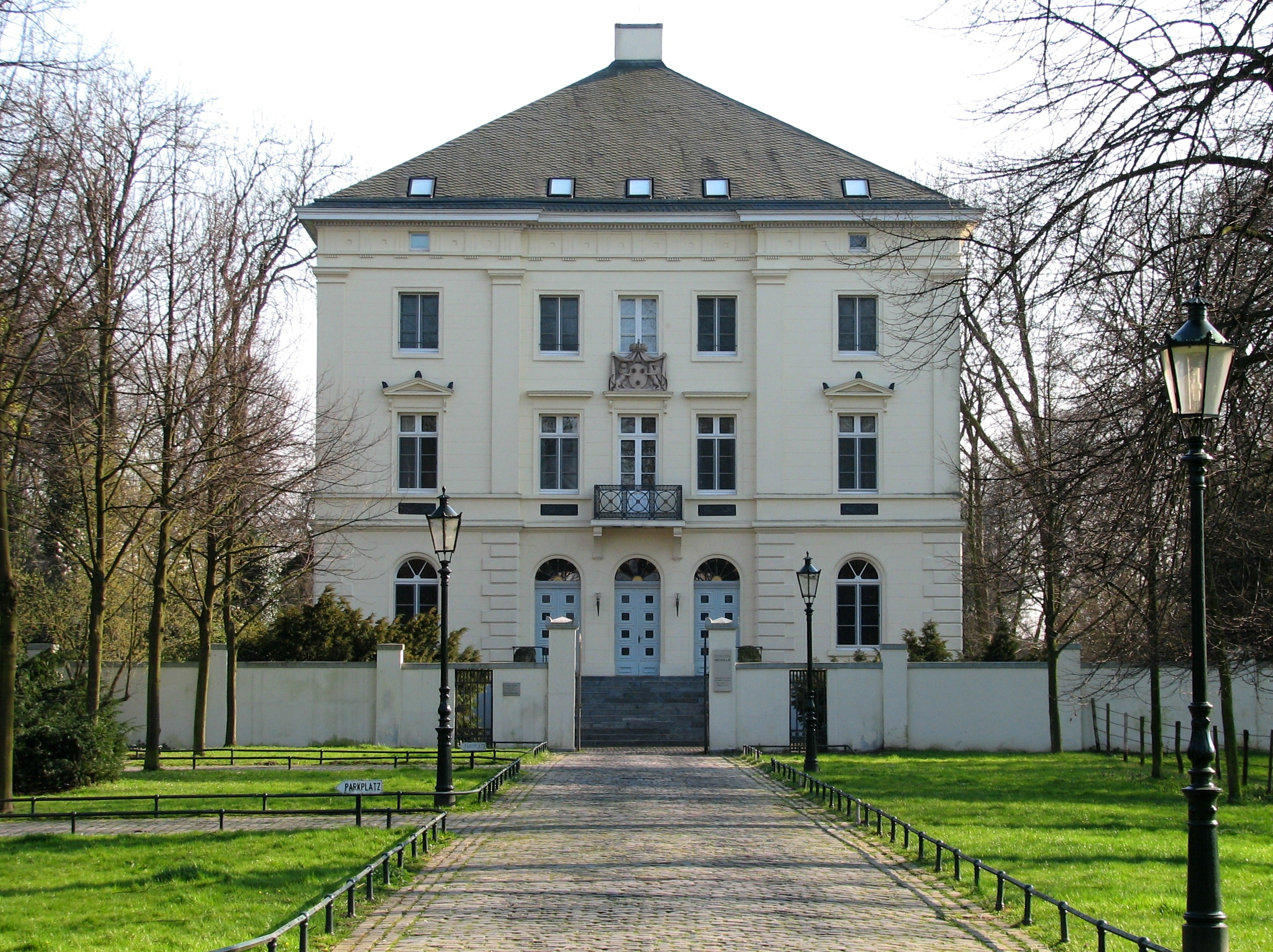
Mickeln Manor House

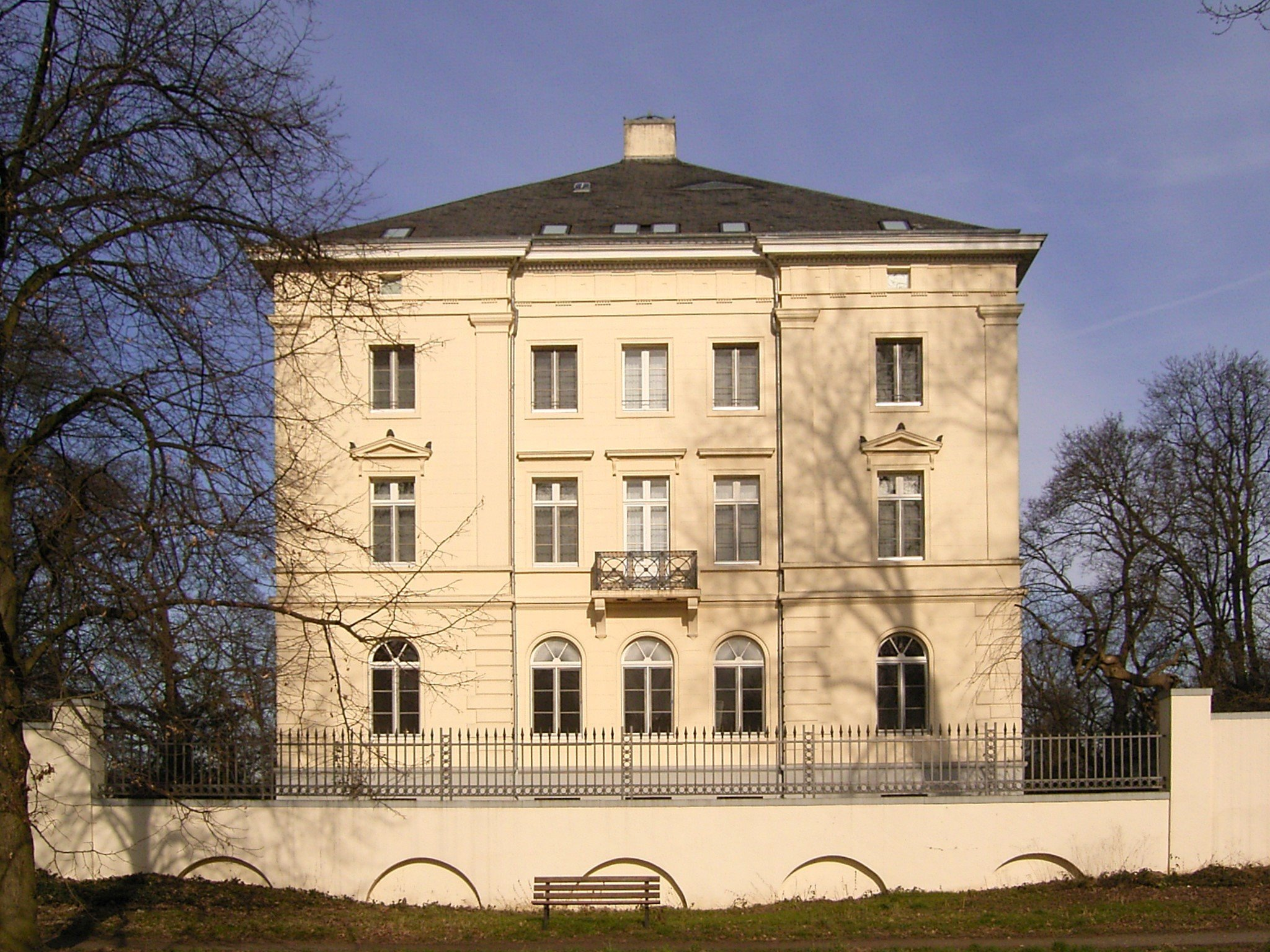
Rear view

Mickeln House (German: Schloss Mickeln) is a manor house in Düsseldorf's Himmelgeist neighbourhood.

It was erected in 1843 on the site of Haus Mickeln, which went back to 1210. As that building had been destroyed in a fire in 1836, Herzog Ludwig von Arenberg used an insurance payment to have renowned architect Josef Niehaus rebuild the manor as a summer residence. Niehaus used engravings of villas built in the 16th century by Galeazzo Alessi as a template.

The manor has a square plan, each side measuring 19.55 metres. All perspectives are designed identically, apart from an outside staircase on the northern side. The entrance portal is surrounded by lime trees. That concept was already envisaged in 1843, when the surrounding gardens were designed by Maximilian Friedrich Weyhe. Some of the trees, e.g. plane trees, European beech, and two Lebanon cedars, have survived; the last-named are considered one of Düsseldorf's natural monuments.

Since June 2000, the estate has been used as a conference centre and guest house by Düsseldorf University.

== Literature ==
- Ludger Fischer: Die schönsten Schlösser und Burgen am Niederrhein. Wartberg, Gudensberg-Gleichen 2004, ISBN 3-8313-1326-1.
- Norbert Richarz, Susanne Weisser: Der Schlosspark Mickeln in Düsseldorf-Himmelgeist. In: Denkmalpflege im Rheinland. 19, 1, 2002, ISSN 0177-2619, S. 9–14.
