= Hassels =

City district of Düsseldorf, Germany

Coordinates: 51°10′45″N 6°52′26″E

Map of Düsseldorf, showing Hassels (in red) within Borough 9 (in pink)

Hassels (German pronunciation: [ˈhasl̩s]) is an urban quarter in Düsseldorf, Germany, part of Borough 9. It has an area of 4.37 km^{2} (1.69 sq mi), and 18,465 inhabitants (2020).

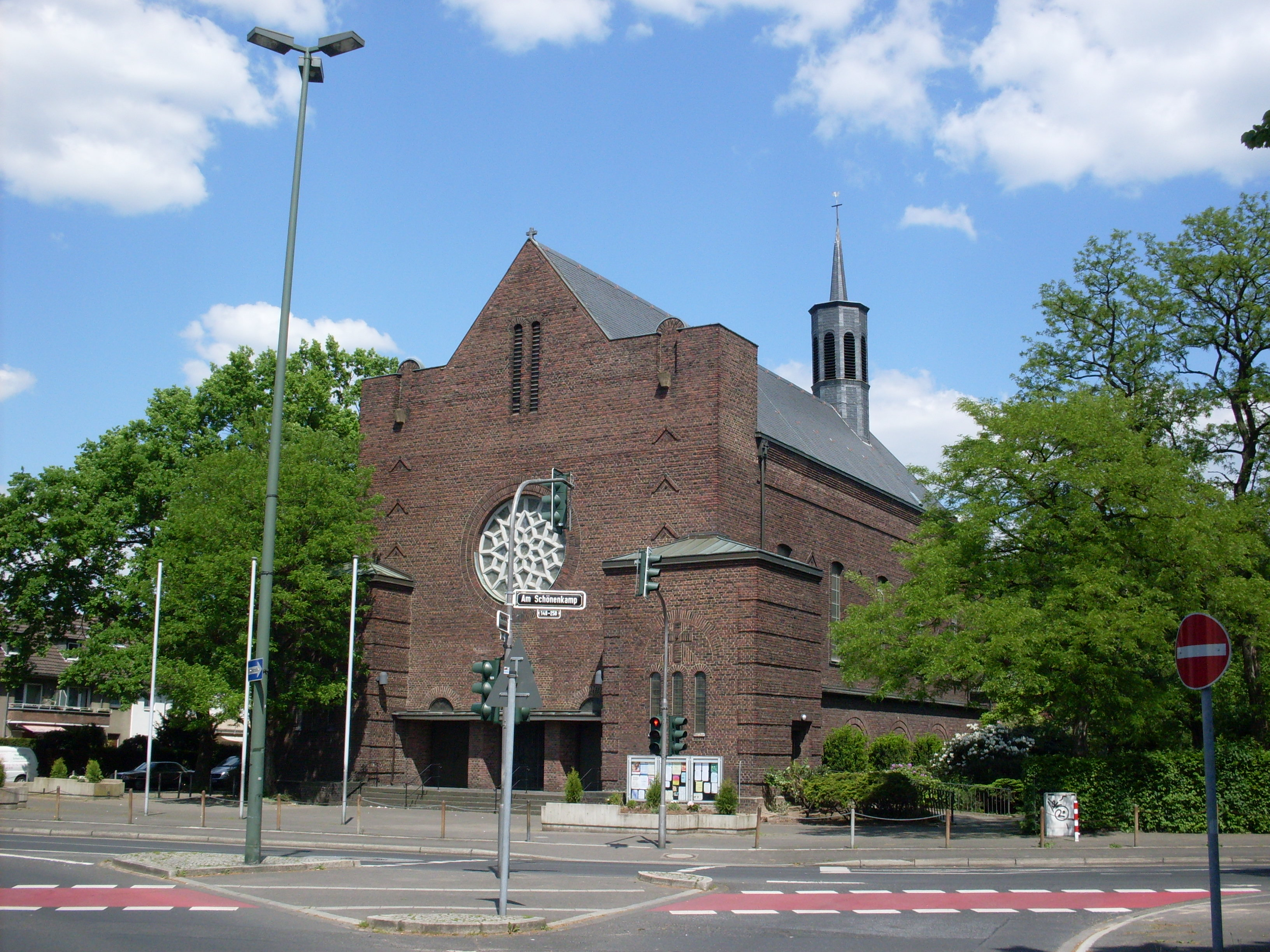
St. Antonius

It was called "Hasselholt" (modern German Haselholz) meaning hazel wood until the 17th century, when it was shortened to its current name.

Hassels belonged to the Knights of Eller and was later administered by the mayor of Benrath. In 1929 Hassels and Benrath were absorbed into Düsseldorf.

Large housing developments were built in Hassels in the 1920s, the 1950s and in the 1970s.

Hassels' 17th century church no longer exists. St. Antonius is a Catholic church built in 1929 and there is a Protestant church built in 1964.
