= Himmelgeist =

City district of Düsseldorf, Germany

Coordinates: 51°10′23″N 6°48′36″E

Map of Düsseldorf, showing Himmelgeist (in red) within Borough 9 (in pink)

Himmelgeist (German pronunciation: [ˈhɪml̩ˌɡaɪst]) is a quarter (Stadtteil) of Düsseldorf, part of Borough 9. It is an old village, which is dominated by agriculture until today. Himmelgeist lies by the river Rhine, neighbouring to Flehe and Itter. It has an area of 4.46 km^{2} (1.72 sq mi), and 2,067 inhabitants (2020).

It is a small suburb of Düsseldorf. Himguis was mentioned first time in a document of 904. Himmelgeist had many problems with the neighboring river Rhine throughout its history.

== Gallery ==
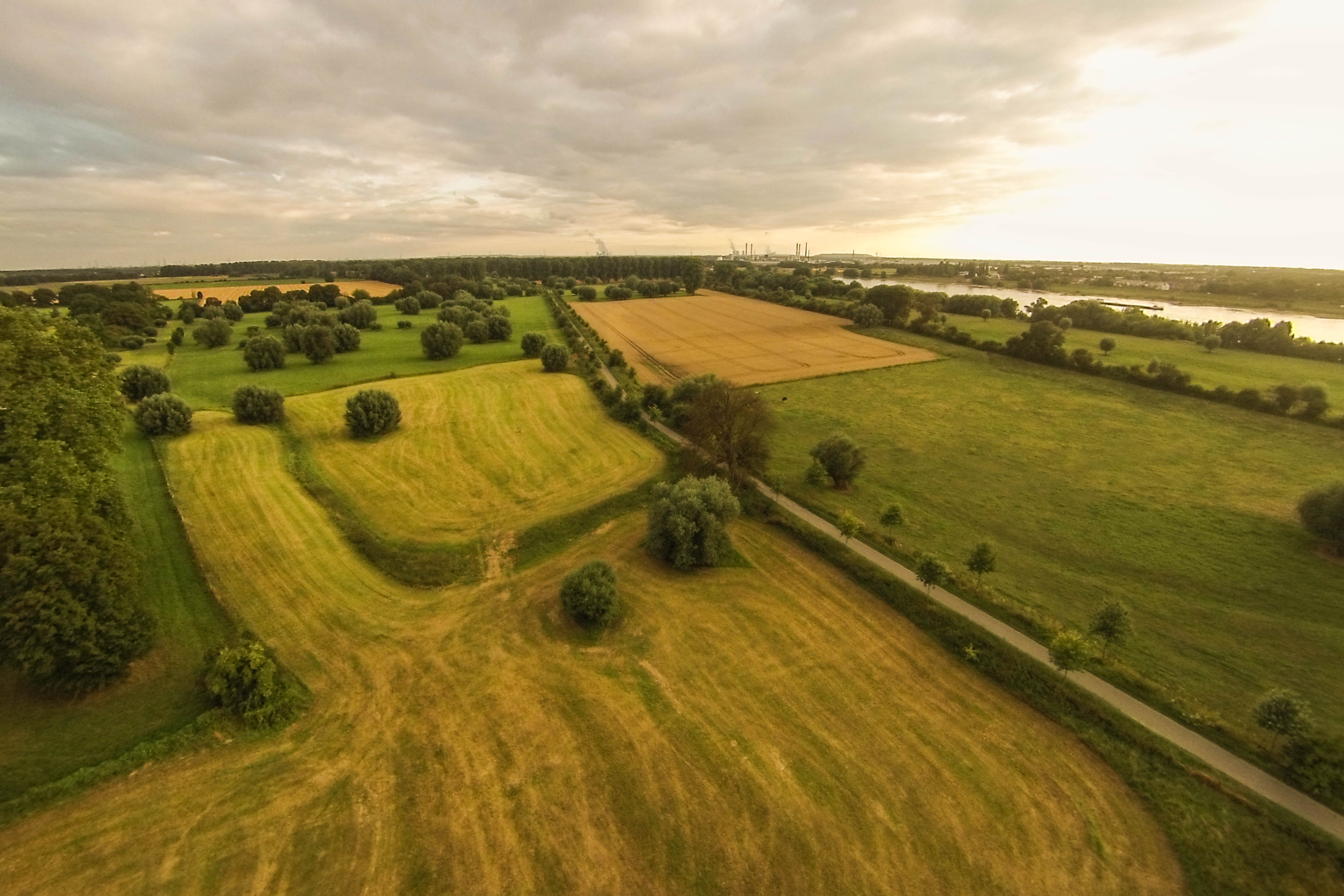
Landscape of Himmelgeist

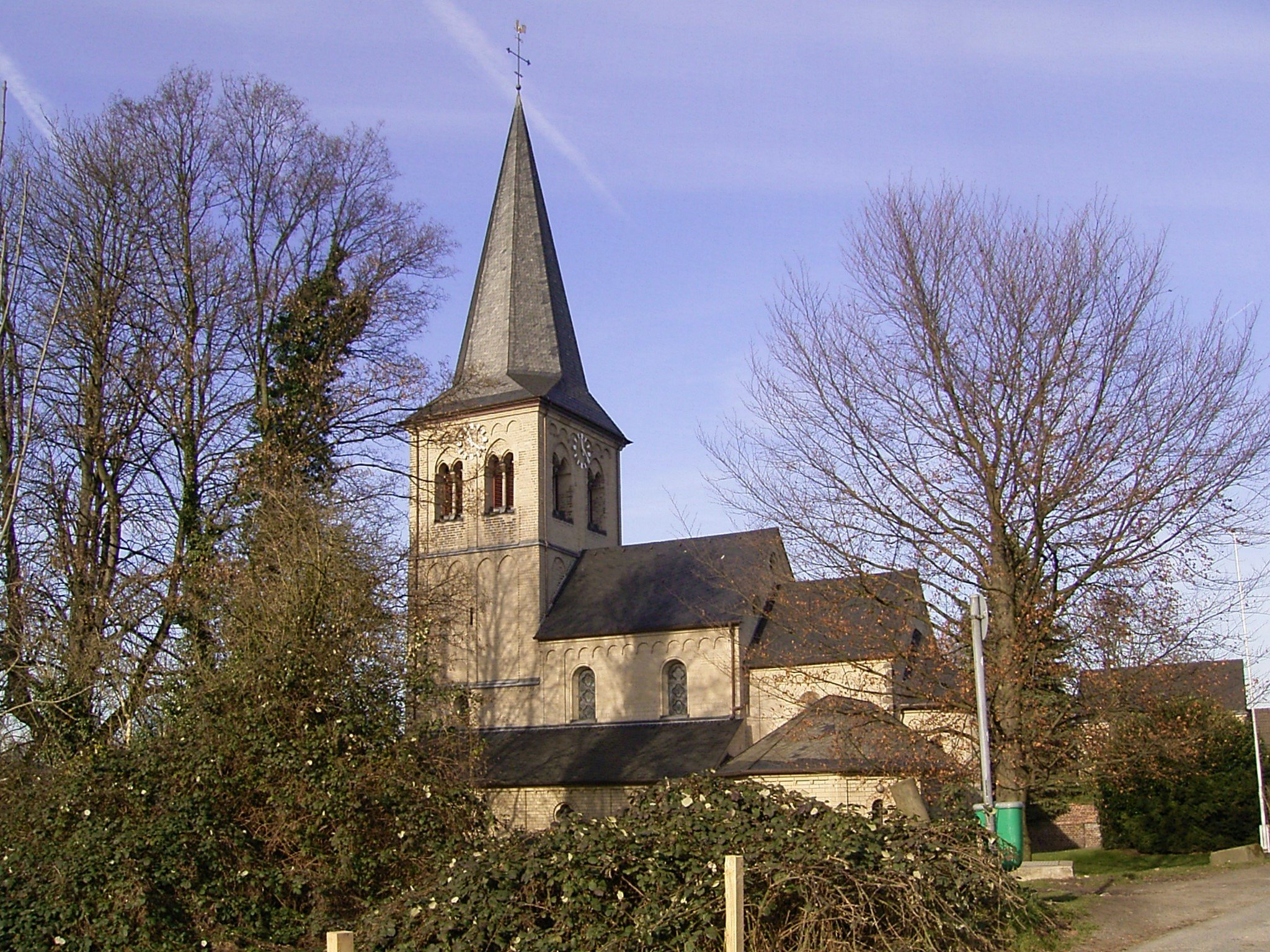
St Nikolaus

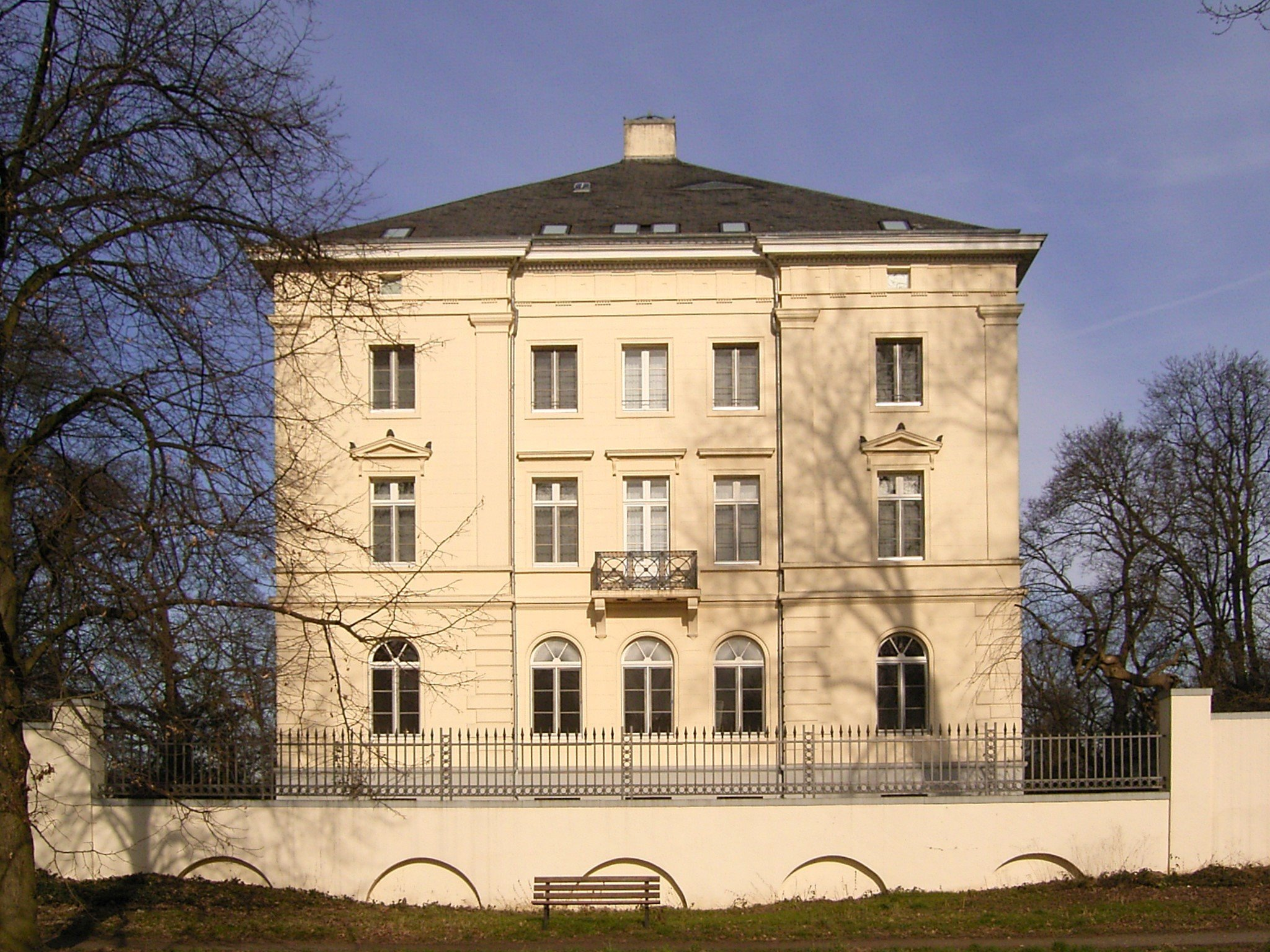
Mickeln House

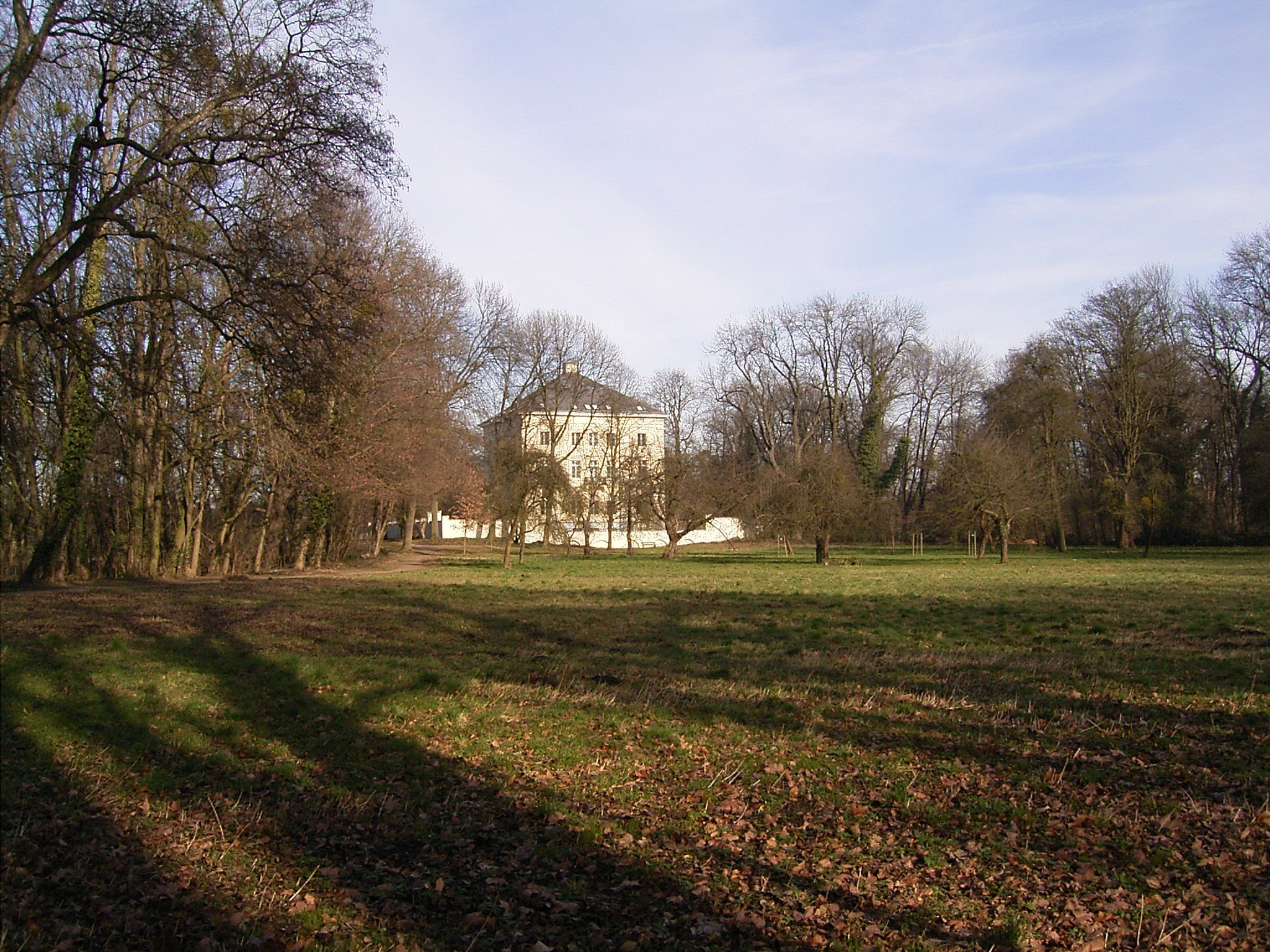
Gardens around the house

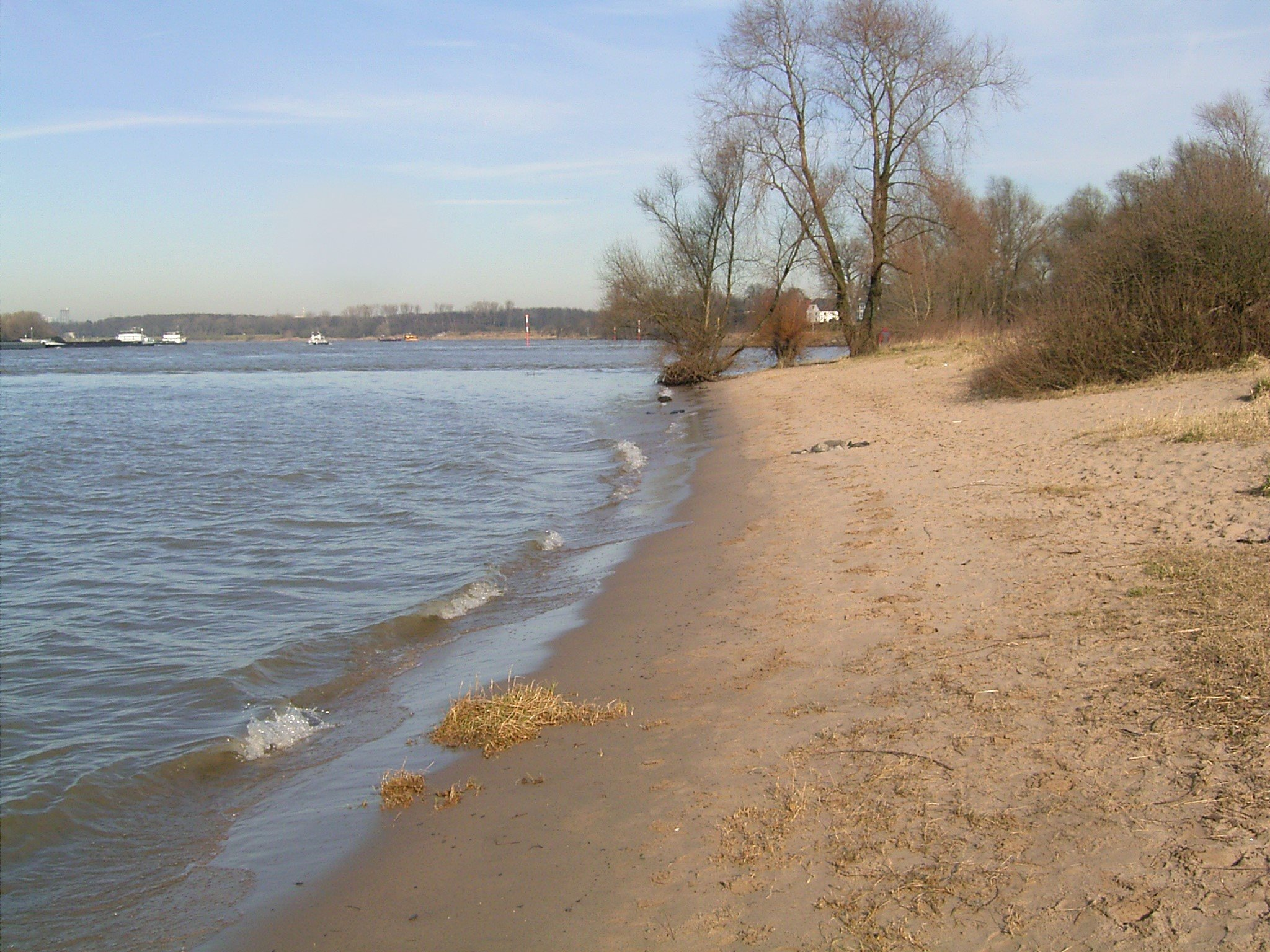
River Rhine
