= Urdenbach =

City district of Düsseldorf, Germany

Map of Düsseldorf, showing Urdenbach (in red) within Borough 9 (in pink)

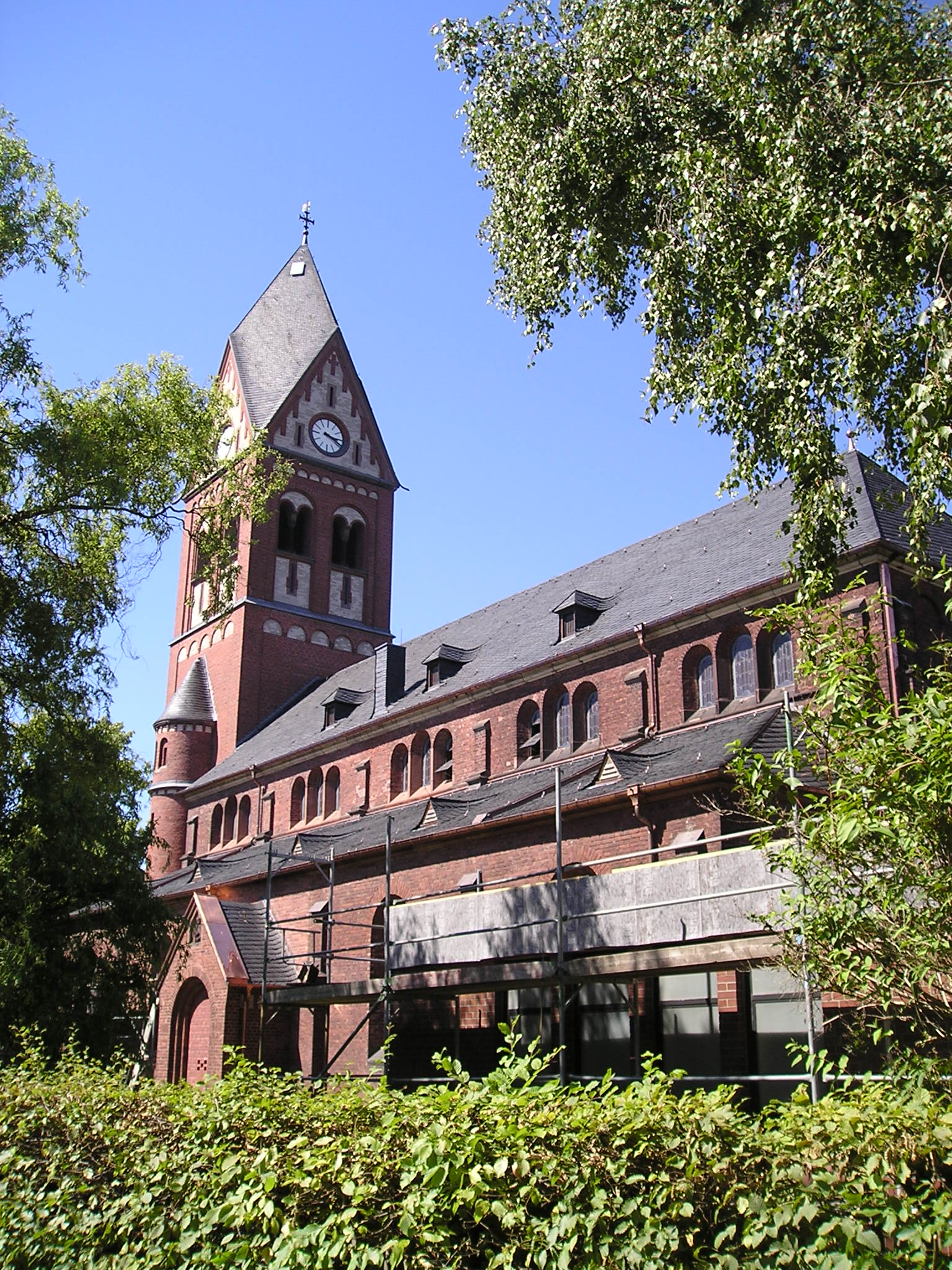
Roman Catholic Church

Urdenbach (German pronunciation: [ˈʊʁdn̩bax]) is an urban quarter of Düsseldorf, part of Borough 9. It is located in the south of the city, next to the neighboring town Monheim am Rhein and bordered by the river Rhine.

== History ==
The river Rhine changed its way in the 14th century at the place where Urdenbach is located today. It was not only a fishing settlement, but a place of trading. There are a lot of timber framed houses, built up in that era. The Calvinist Church is from the year 1692, constructed in the baroque style. The Roman Catholic Church was built in Neo-romanesque style in 1893. Urdenbach became part of Düsseldorf in 1929.

The Benrath line, the line between northern German pronunciations and southern German pronunciations, goes across Urdenbach.

== Statistics ==
Urdenbach has an area of 7.55 km^{2} (2.92 sq mi), and 10,559 inhabitants (2020).

- Grundschule: 2
- Gymnasiums: 1
- no highway connection, no station, no tram line
- 2 bus lines (784, 788)
- 1 federal road tangenting Urdenbach

== Gallery ==
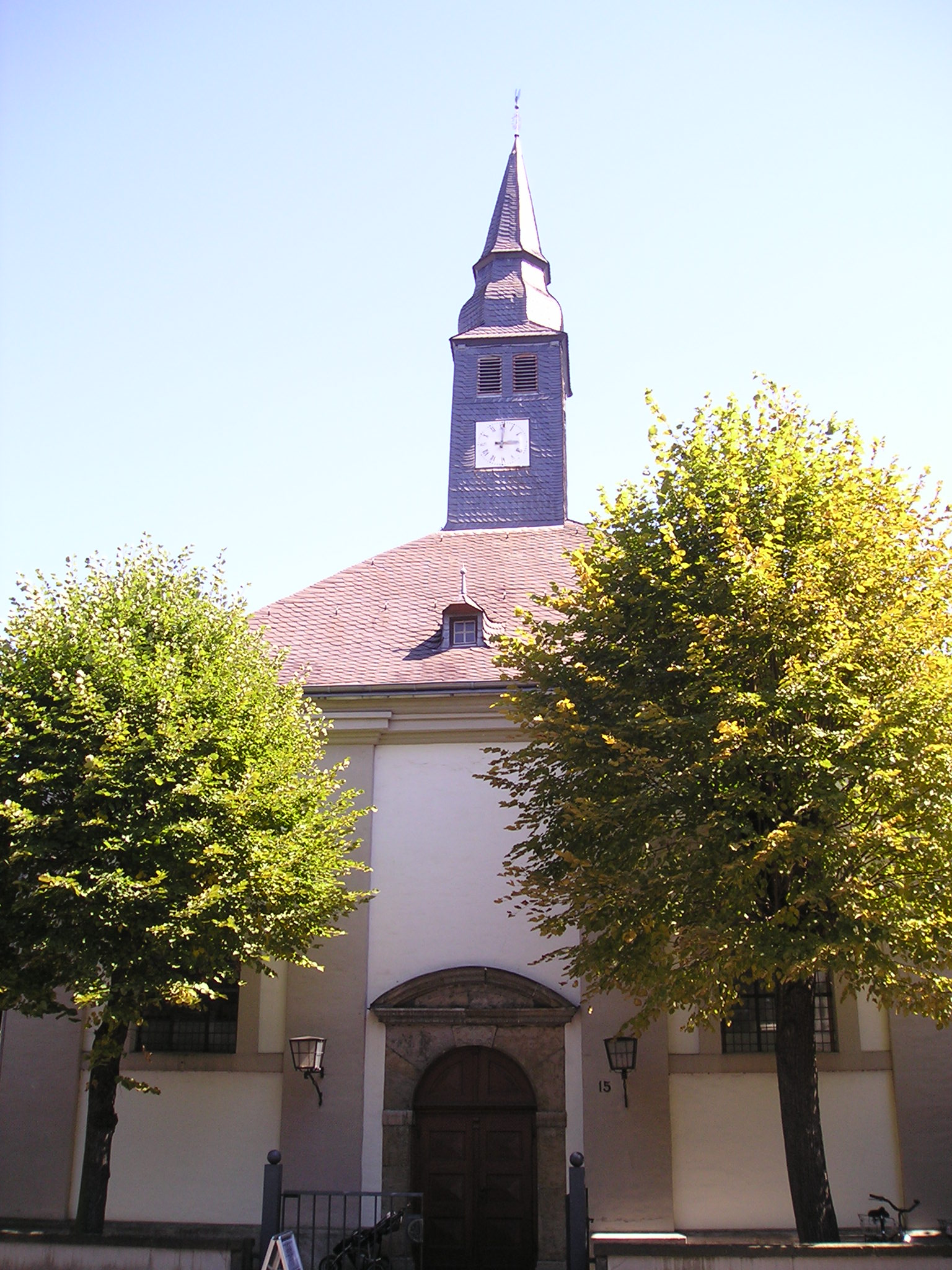
Calvinist Church

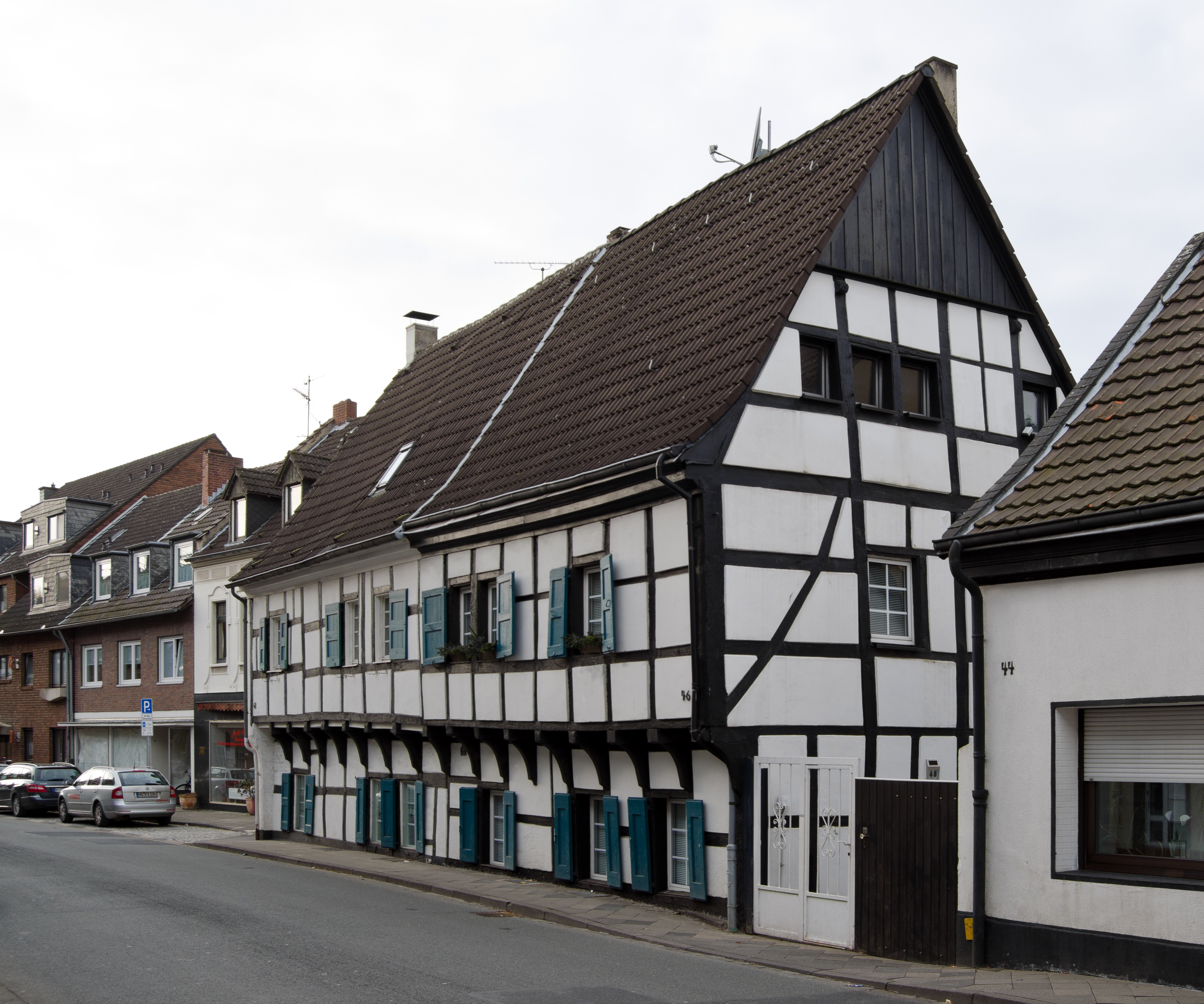
Former courthouse, built in 1535

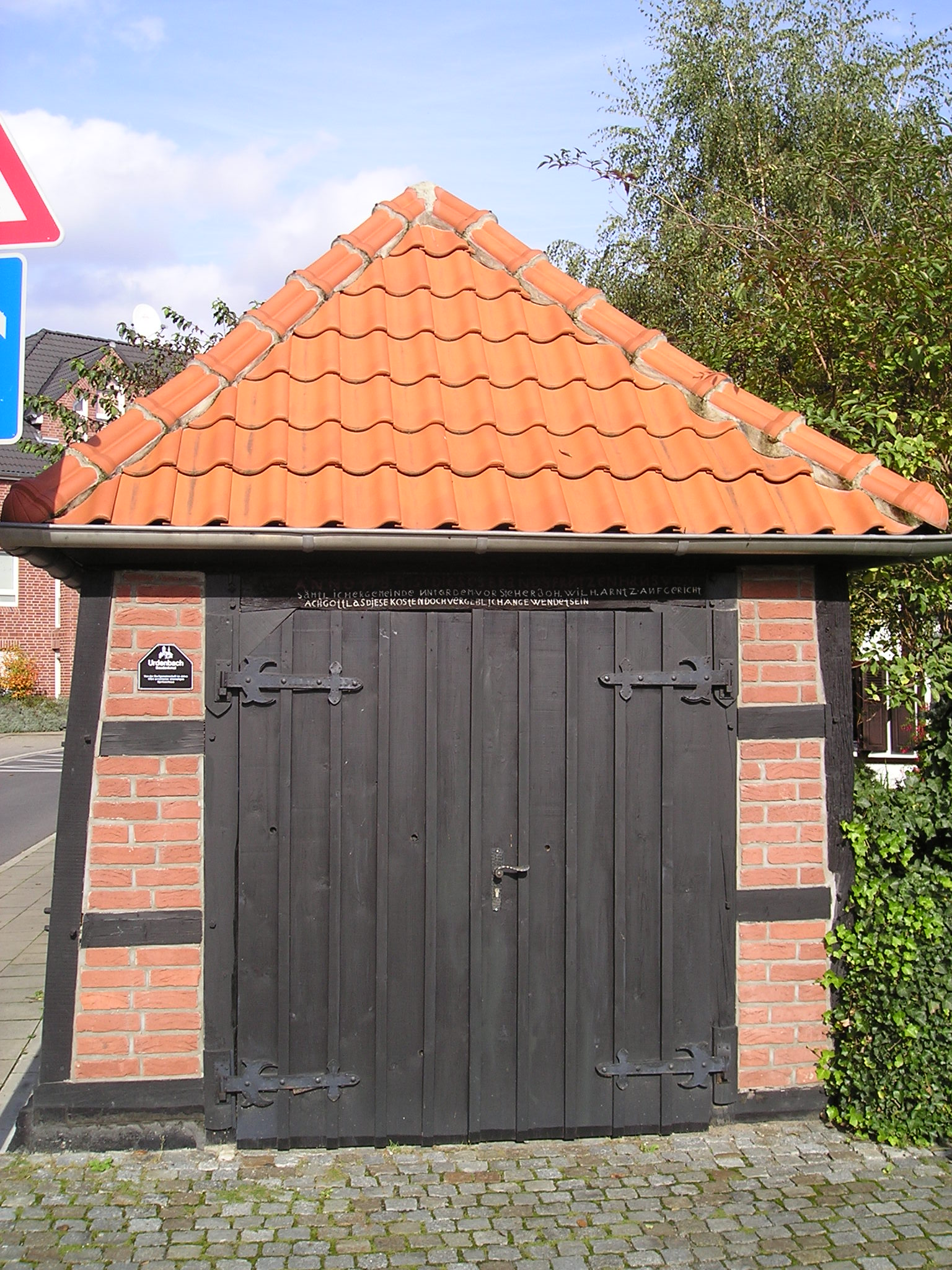
Old fire engine house ("Spritzenhaus", 1784)
