= Düsseldorf-Benrath =

Quarter of Düsseldorf in North Rhine-Westphalia, Germany

- Stadtteil of Düsseldorf
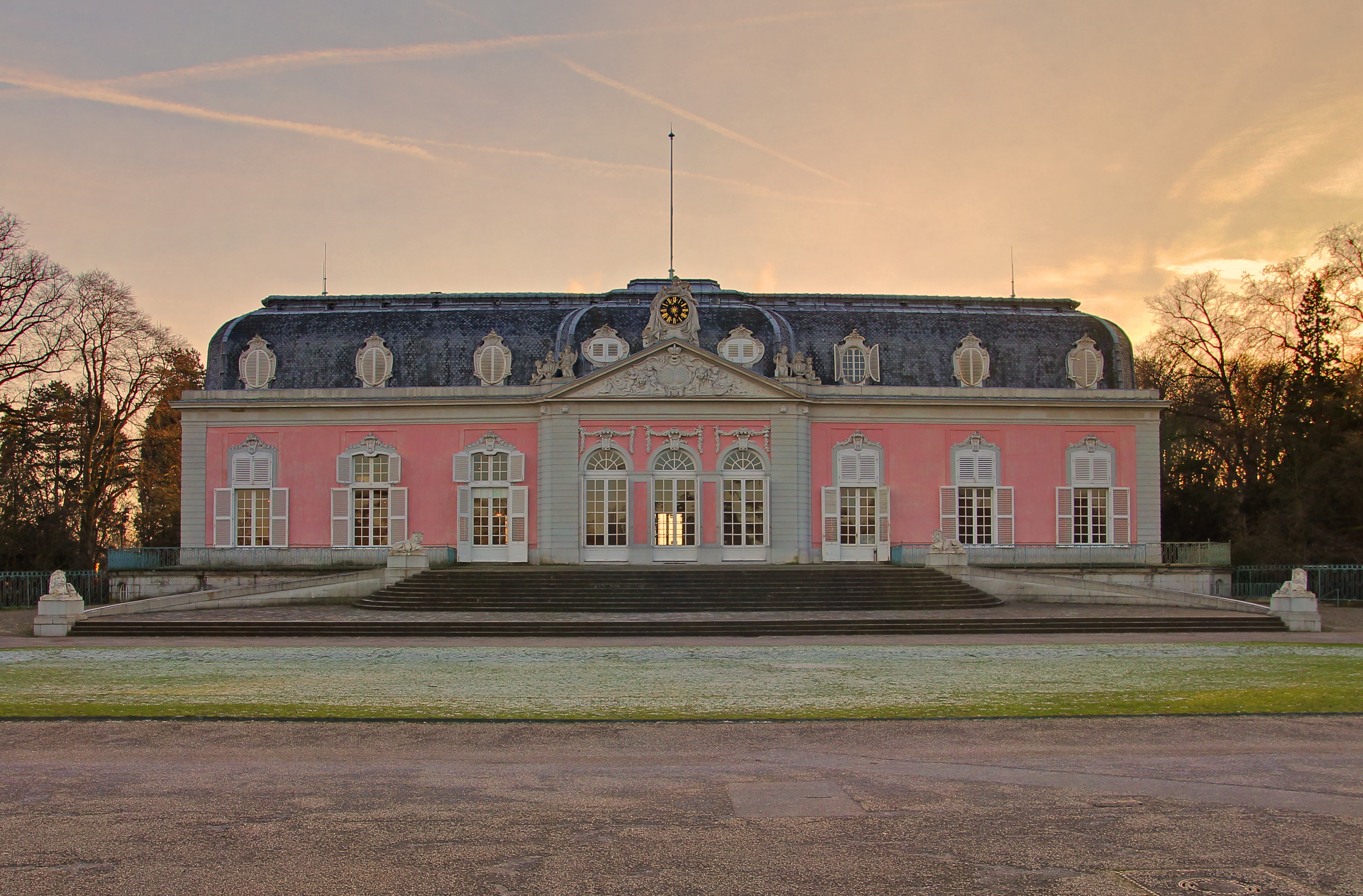
- Schloss Benrath, main building, front side

- Coat of arms

- Map of Düsseldorf, showing Benrath (in red) within Borough 9 (in pink)
- Interactive map of Düsseldorf-Benrath
- Location within Germany Location within North Rhine-Westphalia
- Coordinates: 51°09′41″N 6°52′26″E
- Country: Germany
- State: North Rhine-Westphalia
- District: Urban district
- City: Düsseldorf
- Borough: Borough 9

Area
  - Total: 5.99 km^{2} (2.31 sq mi)

Population (2020-12-31)
  - Total: 17,178
  - Density: 2,870/km^{2} (7,430/sq mi)
- Time zone: UTC+01:00 (CET)
  - Summer (DST): UTC+02:00 (CEST)

Benrath (German pronunciation: [ˈbɛnʁaːt]) is a quarter of Düsseldorf in the south of the city, part of Borough 9. It has been a part of Düsseldorf since 1929. Benrath has an area of 5.99 km^{2} (2.31 sq mi), and 17,178 inhabitants (2020).

== History ==
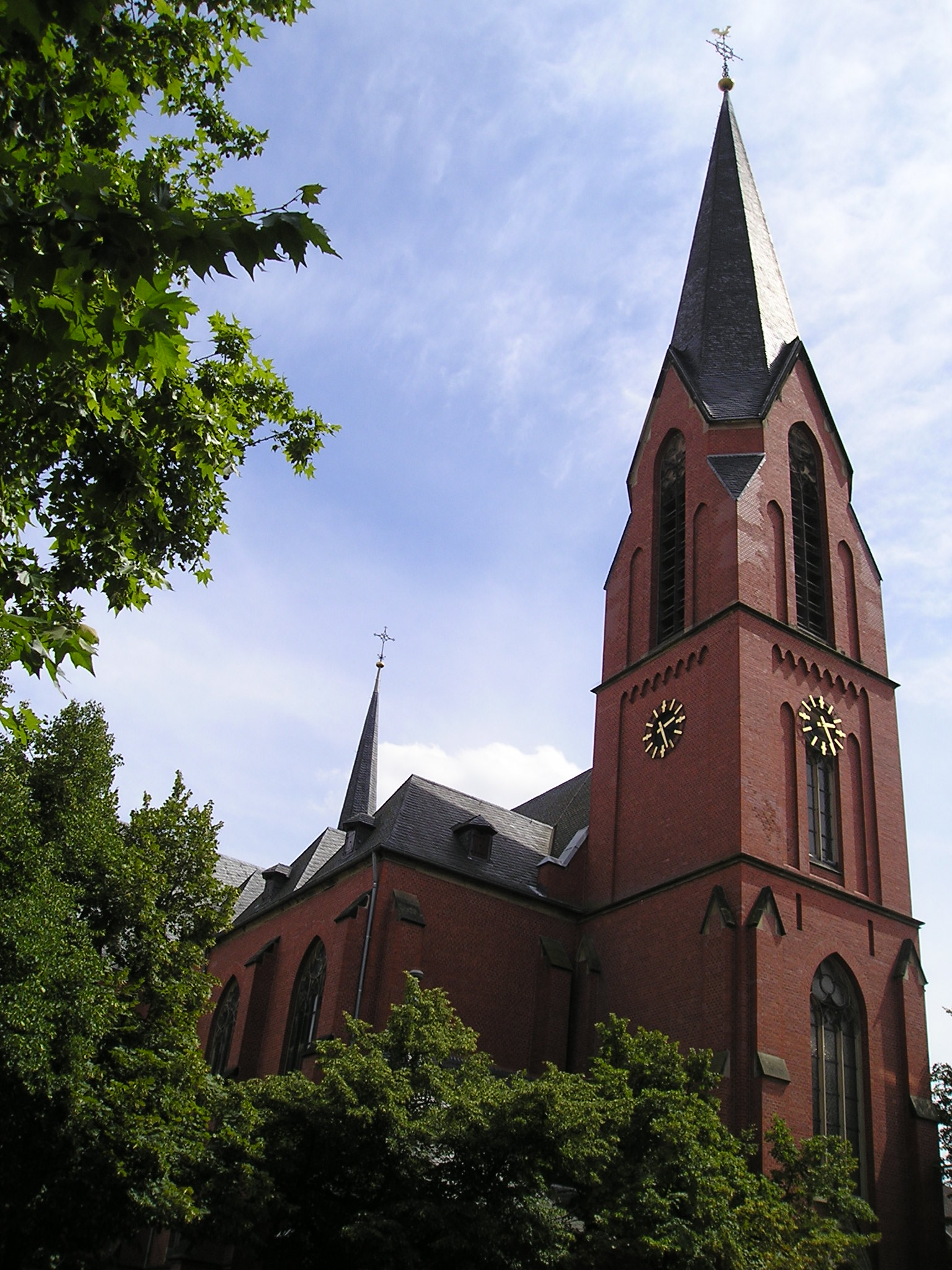

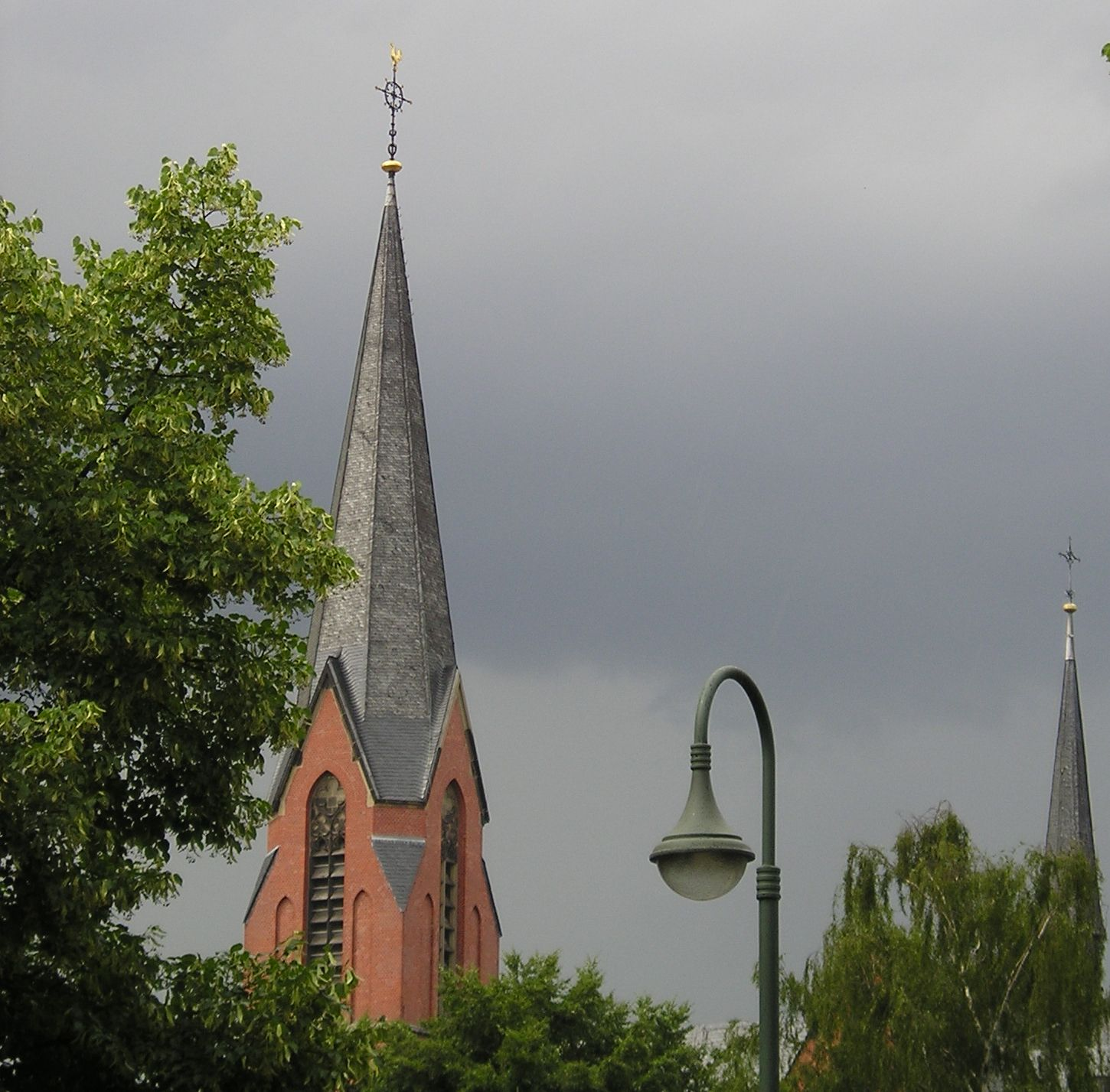
Church St. Cäcilia

The name Benrath came from the "Knights of Benrode". The settlement was mentioned for the first time in 1222 in a document from Cologne where Everhard de Benrode is named as an attestor. By the end of the fifth century the area is known as "Rode" or "Roide", which is a cleared area. The castle and the manor of the Benrodes became property of the Counts of Berg by the 13th century.

The first church of Benrath was constructed in 1002. The village developed parallel to the castle. The old Church St. Cäcilia was built at the time. Benrath is a place of pilgrimage for Roman Catholics.

During the Industrial Revolution, Benrath grew very fast because it is next to the important Cologne–Duisburg railway.

In 1929, Benrath became part of Düsseldorf.

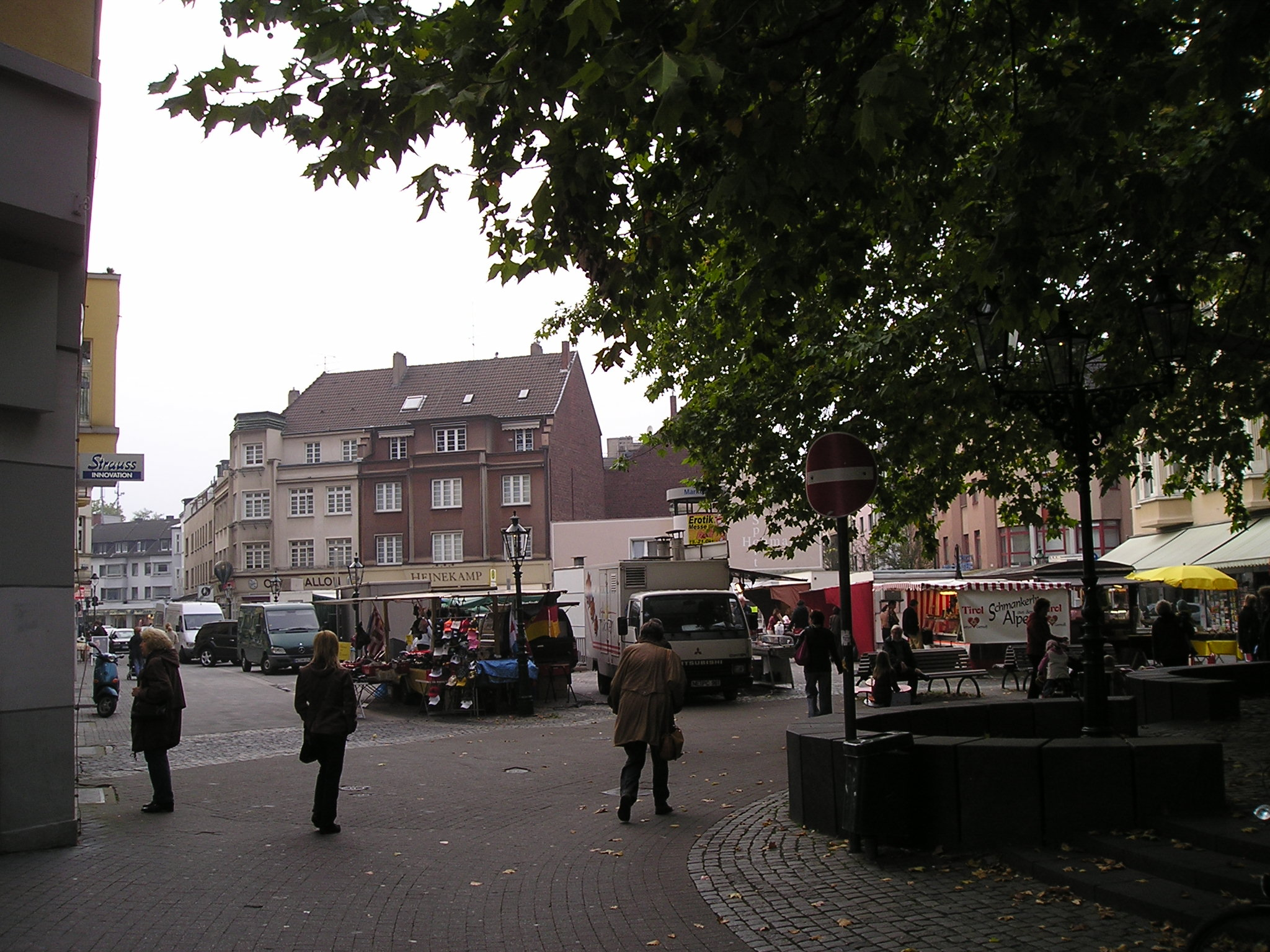
Marketplace

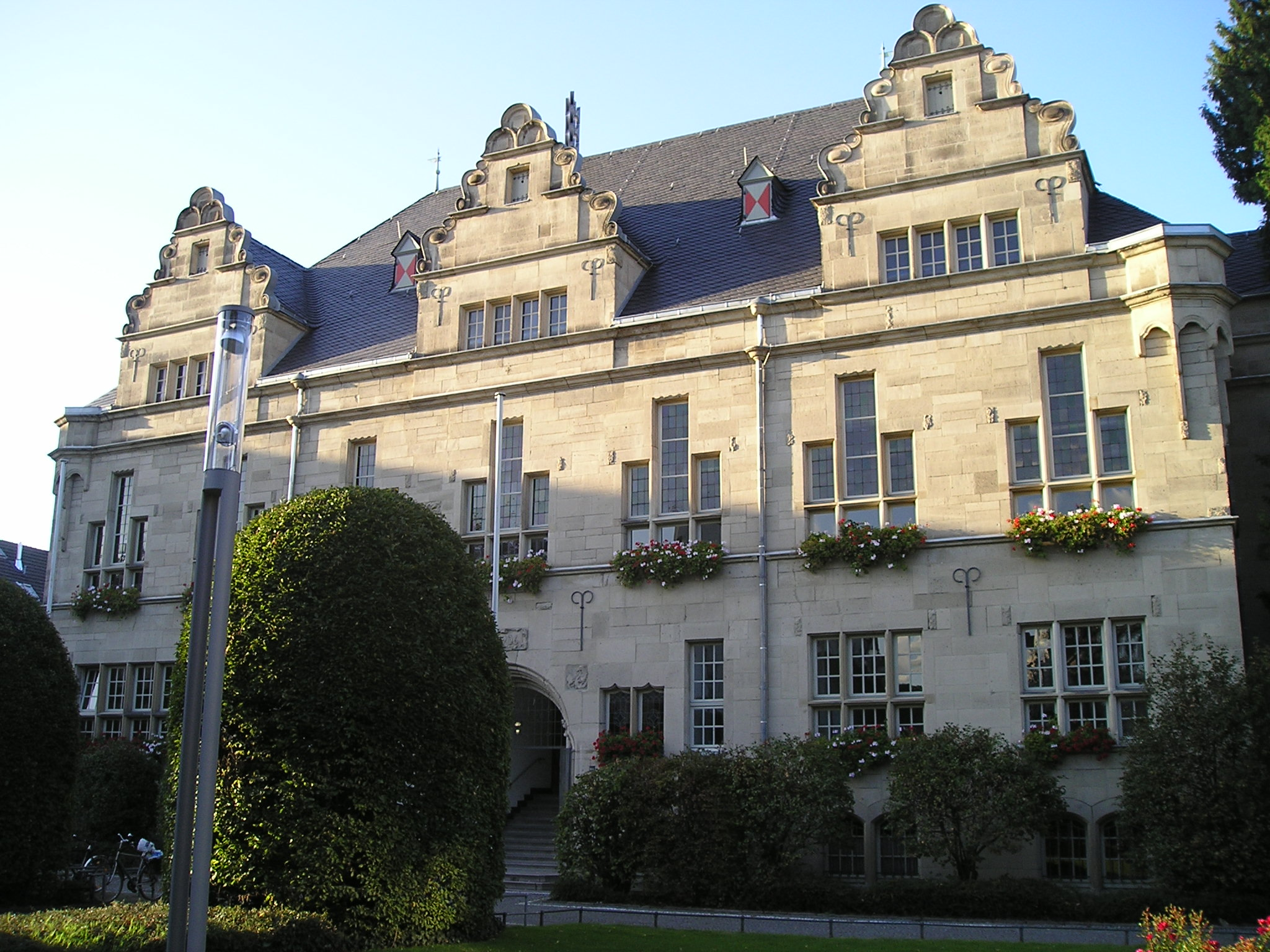
Town hall

== Benrath line ==
In German language linguistics. the Benrath line (or Benrather-Linie) is the border between Low German and Middle German dialects although both sides of the line have a Rhenish dialect. The line is also called maken-machen-line since speakers south of it say machen and north of it maken (to make or to do) because of the High German consonant shift.

== Benrath Castle ==
The Schloss Benrath (Benrath Castle) is one of the greatest baroque castles in Germany. The castle has a museum and a very famous park.

== Regular events ==
- August:
  - Schloss concerts
  - Bier Boerse!
- October:
  - Second Sunday: Light procession through the park of the castle around the Spiegelweiher with the "Black Madonna of Benrath"
- November and December:
  - Advent market and Christmas market

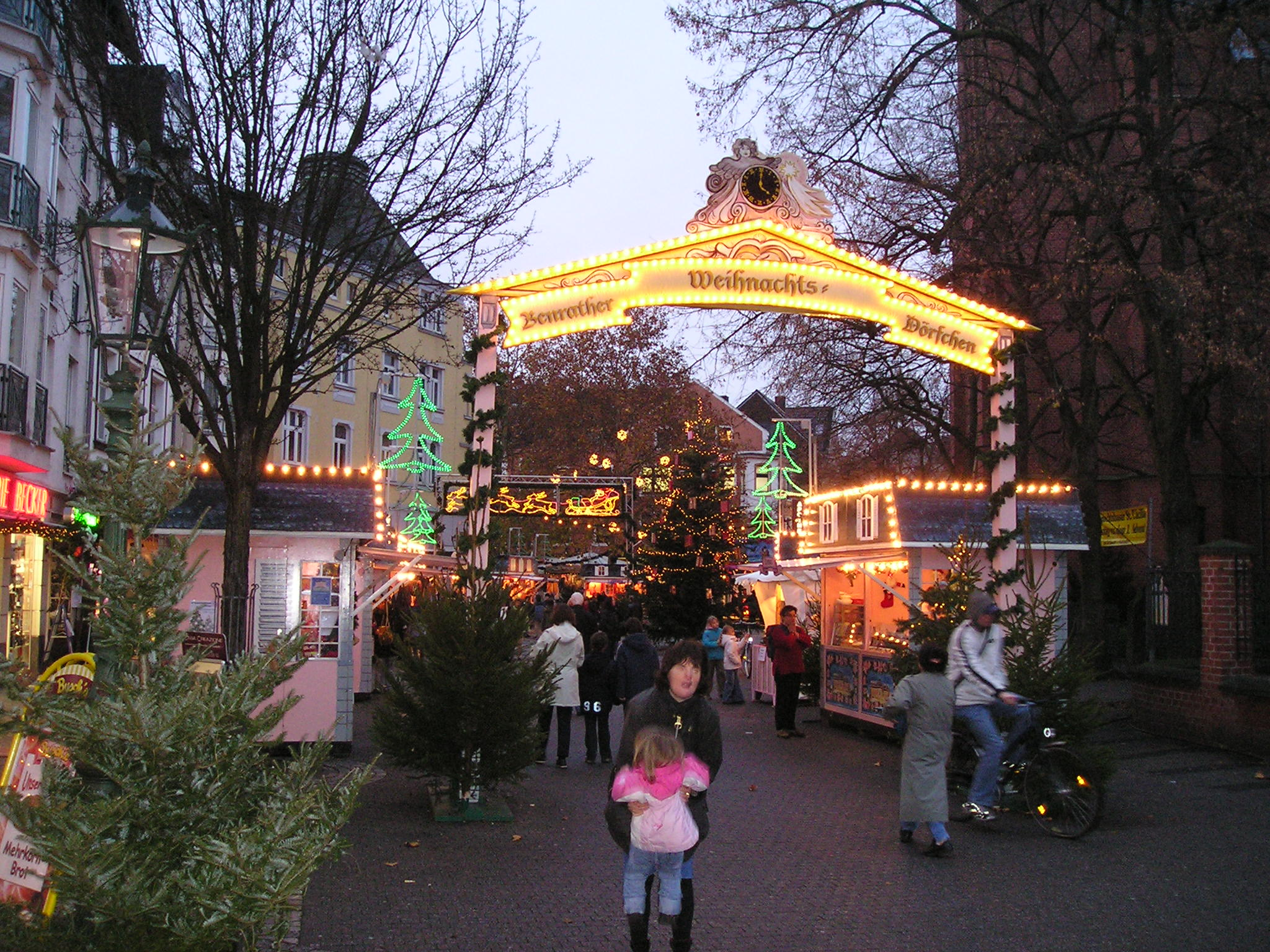
Christmas market 2007

== Schools ==
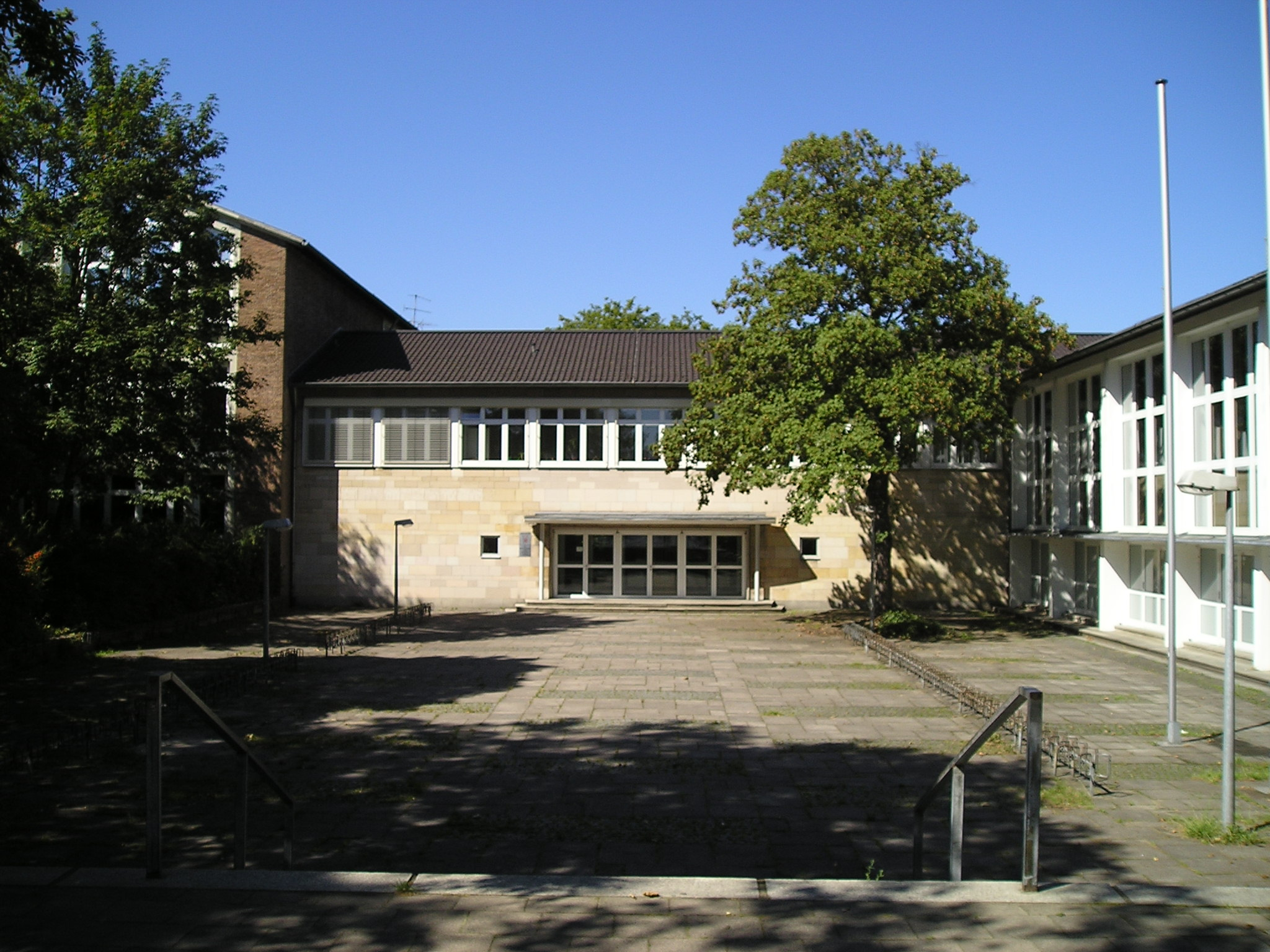
Annette-von-Droste-Hülshoff- Gymnasium

- Annette-von-Droste-Hülshoff-Gymnasium
- Schloß-Gymnasium Benrath
- Realschule Benrath
- Common Hauptschule Benrath,
- Catholic Grundschule:
  - St.-Cäcilia-School
  - Catholic Grundschule Einsiedelstraße,
- Common Grundschule Erich-Müller-Straße

== Sports associations ==
- TSG Benrath 1881 e.V.
- Ruder-Gesellschaft Benrath 1908 e.V.
- Sportgemeinschaft Benrath-Hassels 1910/12 e.V.
- Tennisclub Benrath 1913 e.V.
- VfL Benrath 06 e.V.
- Schützenbruderschaft St. Cäcilia Benrath e.V. von 1553
- DEC Devils e.V. – women icehockey in Düsseldorf

== Sports venues ==
- Sparkassen-Eissporthalle (Sparkasse skating arena), foundation of the Stadtsparkasse Düsseldorf (Savings and loan association Düsseldorf), Paulsmühlenstraße 6

== Personalities ==
- Harry Piel, German film director and actor
- Karl Hohmann, Germany national football team player
- William, Prince of Hohenzollern, head of the house Hohenzollern-Sigmaringen (1905–1927)
- Nathanael Liminski, German politician

== Trails ==
In Benrath begin and end the following marked trails of the Sauerländischer Gebirgsverein (Sauerland Mountain Association):

- The Schlösserweg, trail blazing X19: Benrath, railway station – Dillenburg in Hessen
- The Düsseldorfer Weg, trail blazing D: Benrath, Schöne Aussicht – Kaiserswerth

== Traffic ==
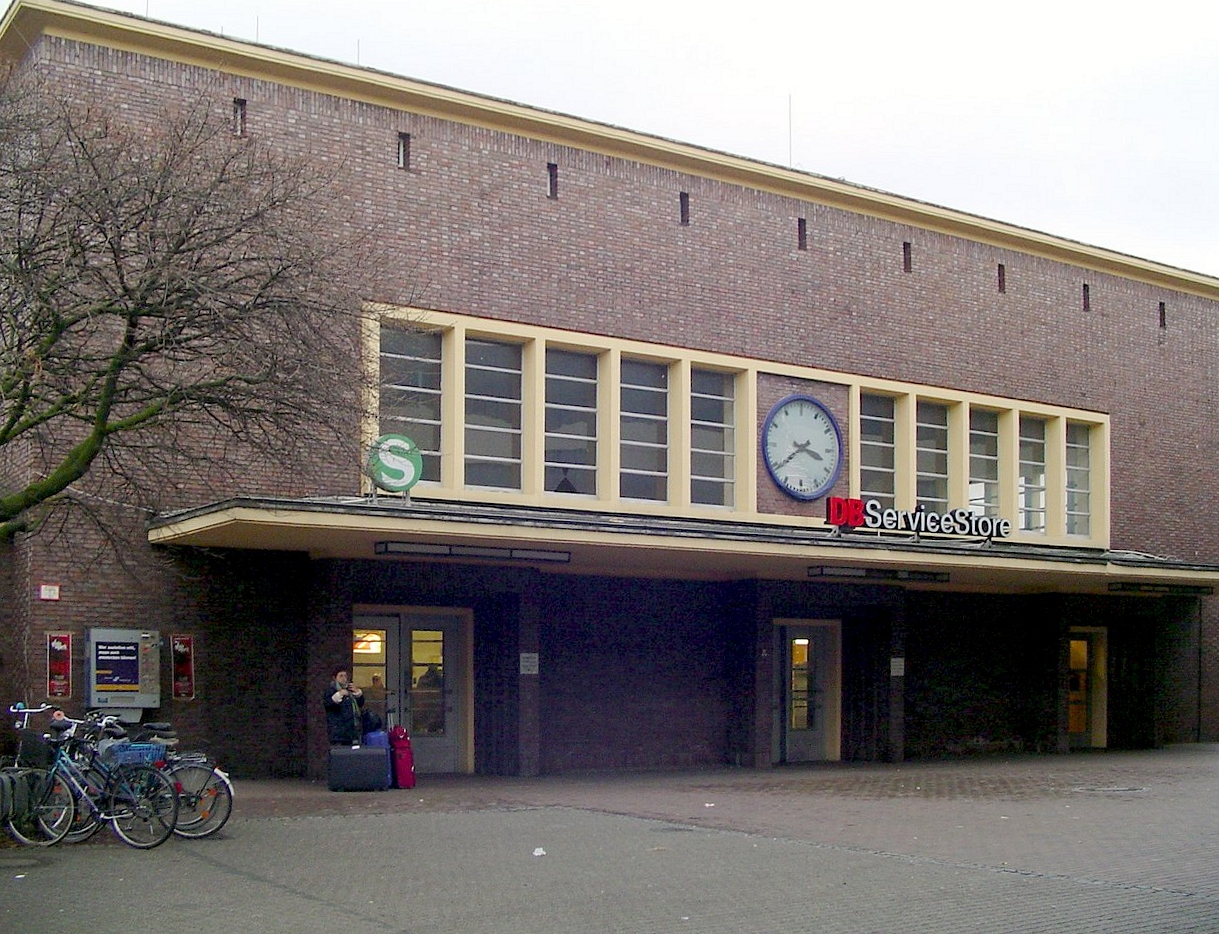
Benrath railway station, building

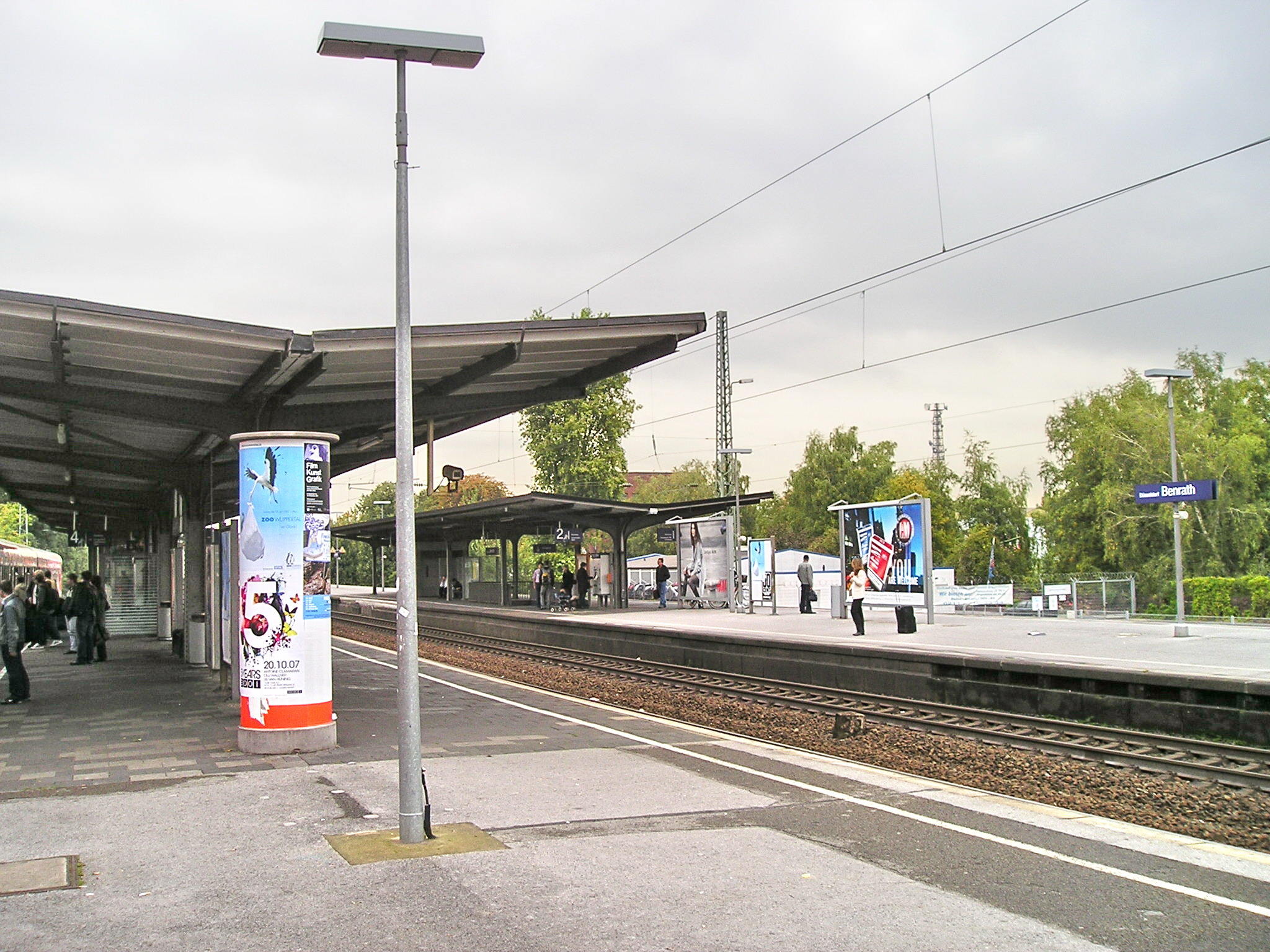
Benrath railway station, tracks

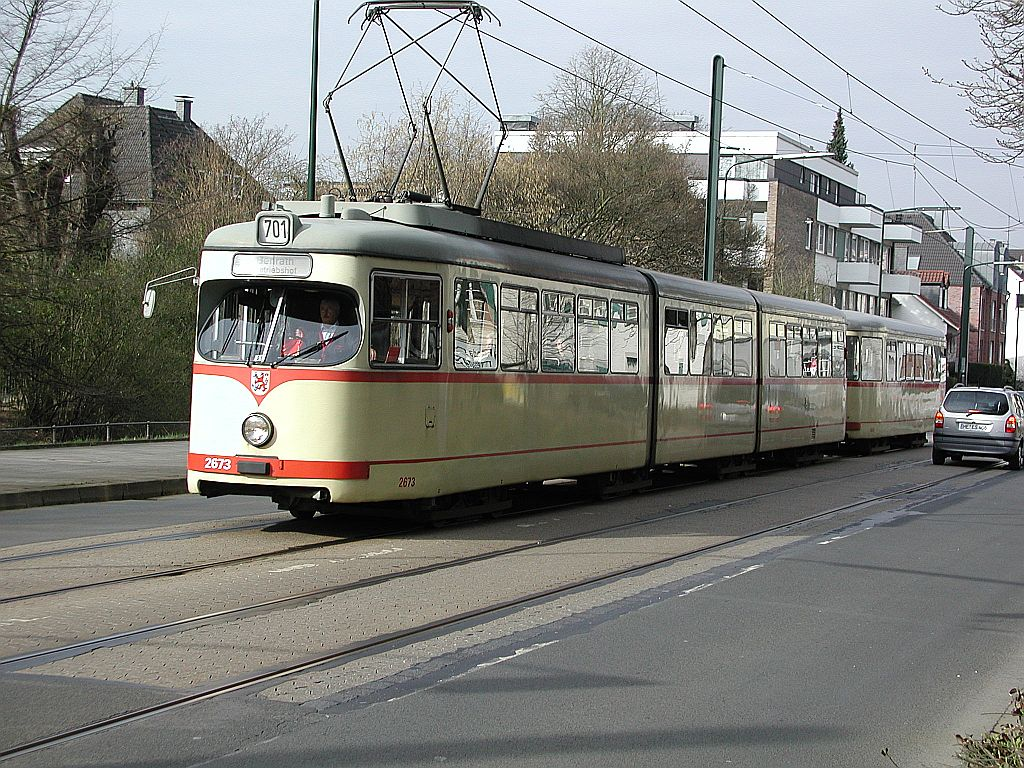
Tram in Benrath

Benrath has a regional railway station on the railway track Cologne–Duisburg line of the historic Cologne-Minden Railway Company. The Düsseldorf-Benrath station is a pre-modern clinker brick building Bahnhof from the 1930s and the second railway station at this place. It is served by two Regional-Express services: RE 1 (NRW-Express) and RE 5 (Rhein-Express) and Rhine-Ruhr S-Bahn line S 6, all operated by Deutsche Bahn.

A tram of the Rheinbahn, line 701, connects Benrath to the city of Düsseldorf. There are also the lines 730 Urdenbach-Lohausen, 778/779 circle course Garath, 784 Urdenbach–Hilden–Wuppertal-Vohwinkel, 788 Benrath Ost–Monheim am Rhein (Busanzeige Monamare) and 789 Holthausen–Monheim am Rhein (Busanzeige Monamare) in Benrath.

By 1962, a single-track narrow gauge tram went from Benrath (beginning in the Paulistraße) via Hilden to Solingen-Ohligs to Haan and Wuppertal-Vohwinkel. The railway went beyond Benrath to Düsseldorf, Oberbilker Markt, and formed the so-called Benrather Netz, which was bought by Düsseldorf in 1910 and so before the amalgamation of Benrath. The multiple unit No. 107 of the railway is preserved in the Bergisches Straßenbahnmuseum in Wuppertal-Kohlfurt.

At Autobahn A59 is a Anschlussstelle „Düsseldorf-Benrath“.

== Sources ==
- Wolfgang D. Sauer: Düsseldorf-Benrath. Alte Bilder erzählen. Sutton Verlag, Erfurt 2006, ISBN 978-3-86680-065-6
- Benrather Heimatgeschichte, hrsg.v. Benrather Kulturkreis e.V. und der Heimatgemeinschaft Groß-Benrath e.V., Düsseldorf 1956, erw. Neuaufl. Düsseldorf 1974
