= Ludenberg =

Düsseldorf-Ludenberg
- Stadtteil of Düsseldorf
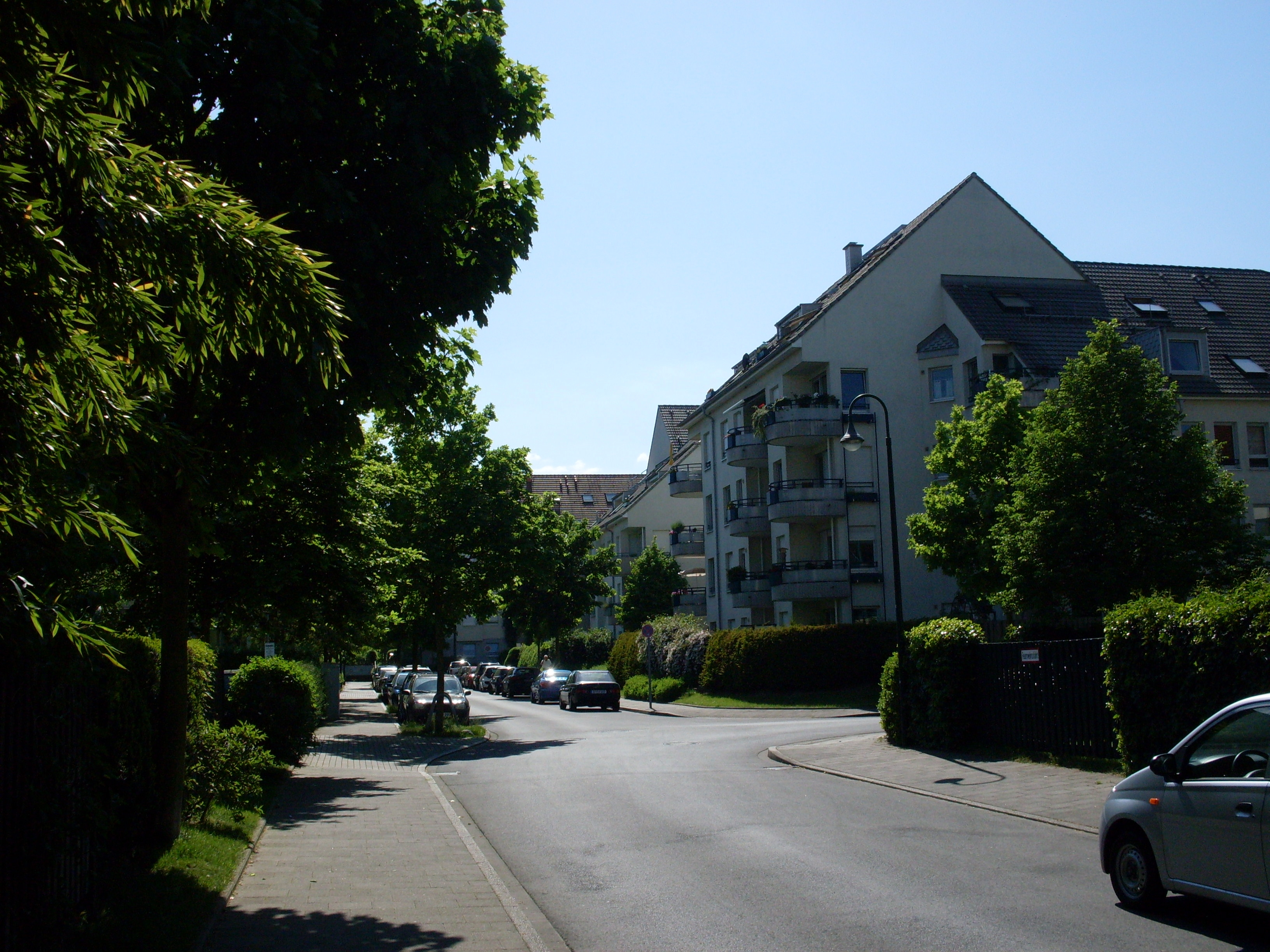

- Map of Düsseldorf, showing Ludenberg (in red) within Borough 7 (in pink)
- Interactive map of Düsseldorf-Ludenberg
- Location within Germany Location within North Rhine-Westphalia
- Coordinates: 51°15′26″N 6°51′51″E
- Country: Germany
- State: North Rhine-Westphalia
- District: Urban district
- City: Düsseldorf
- Borough: Borough 7

Area
  - Total: 6.26 km^{2} (2.42 sq mi)

Population (2020-12-31)
  - Total: 7,907
  - Density: 1,260/km^{2} (3,270/sq mi)
- Time zone: UTC+01:00 (CET)
  - Summer (DST): UTC+02:00 (CEST)

Ludenberg (German pronunciation: [ˈluːdn̩bɛʁk]) is an urban quarter of Düsseldorf, part of Borough 7. It borders on Gerresheim, Grafenberg, Hubbelrath and Rath. It has an area of 6.26 km^{2} (2.42 sq mi), and 7,907 inhabitants (2020).

Until the beginning of the 19th century, Ludenberg belonged to the mayor's office of Gerresheim together with Erkrath, Vennhausen, Unterbach, Morp, Dorp and Bruchhausen. In 1852 the office of Gerresheim was split into Gerresheim-town and Gerresheim-countryside. So Ludenberg became an independent village with its own mayor. In 1909, Ludenberg became a part of Düsseldorf - together with Gerresheim.

Ludenberg has a lot of infrastructure, such including:

- the race-course of Düsseldorf
- the central psychiatrical clinic of the northern rhineland and
- the traditional tennis club Rochusclub.
