= Unterbach =

Unterbach may refer to:

- Düsseldorf-Unterbach, an urban borough of the German city of Düsseldorf
- Lake Unterbach, a former excavator lake in Düsseldorf
- Unterbach Air Base, a military air base in Switzerland
- Unterbach, Meiringen, a settlement in the Swiss canton of Bern
- Unterbach, St. Martin in Passeier, a hamlet in the Italian province of South Tyrol

Also

- Unterbäch, a municipality in the district of Raron in the canton of Valais in Switzerland
