= Hilden Süd station =

Railway station in Hilden, Germany

Hilden Süd
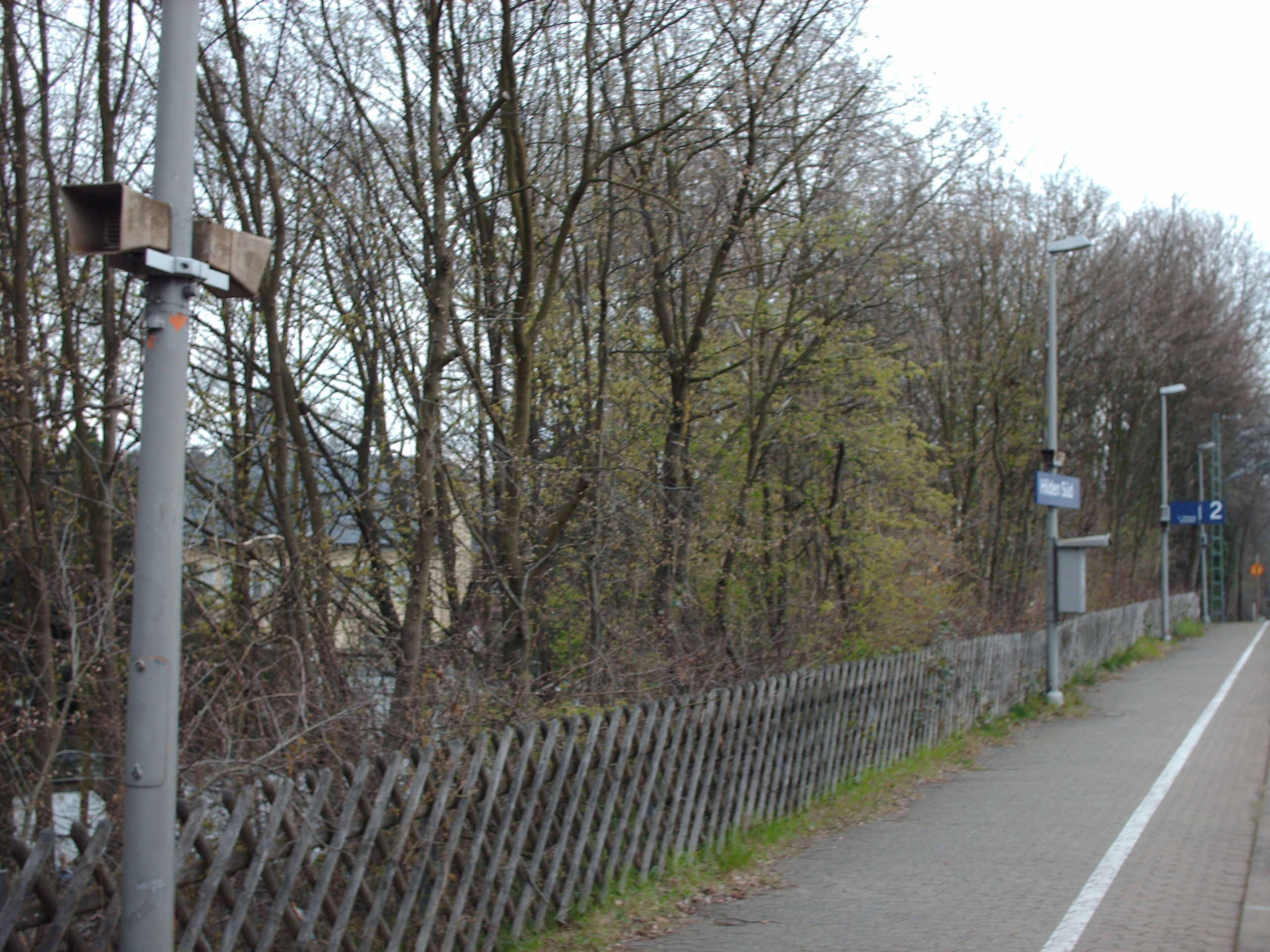

General information
- Location: Hilden, NRW; Germany
- Coordinates: 51°09′49″N 6°56′15″E
- Lines: Düsseldord–Solingen (KBS 450.1)
- Platforms: 2

Construction
- Accessible: Yes

Other information
- Station code: 2764
- DS100 code: KHIS
- IBNR: 8002828
- Category: 5
- Fare zone: VRR: 644; VRS: 1640 (VRR transitional tariff)
- Website: www.bahnhof.de

History
- Opened: 1976/77

Services
Preceding station	Rhine-Ruhr S-Bahn	Following station
Solingen Vogelpark towards Solingen Hbf	S1	Hilden towards Dortmund Hbf
Location

Hilden Süd station is in the city of Hilden in the German state of North Rhine-Westphalia. It is on the Düsseldorf–Solingen railway, which was opened on 3 January 1894 by the Prussian state railways. The station was also opened in 1976 or 1977 and it is classified by Deutsche Bahn as a category 5 station.

The station is served by line S 1 of the Rhine-Ruhr S-Bahn, running between Dortmund and Solingen every 20 minutes during the day.

It is also served by four bus routes, operated by Rheinbahn, generally at 20-minute intervals: 741, 781, 782 and 785.
