= Lierenfeld =

City district of Düsseldorf, Germany

Coordinates: 51°12′33″N 6°49′40″E

Map of Düsseldorf, showing Lierenfeld (in red) within Borough 8 (in pink)

Lierenfeld (German pronunciation: [ˈliːʁənfɛlt]) is an urban quarter of Düsseldorf, part of Borough 8. It borders on Eller, Oberbilk, Flingern and Wersten. It has an area of 2.44 km^{2} (0.94 sq mi), and 11,108 inhabitants (2020).

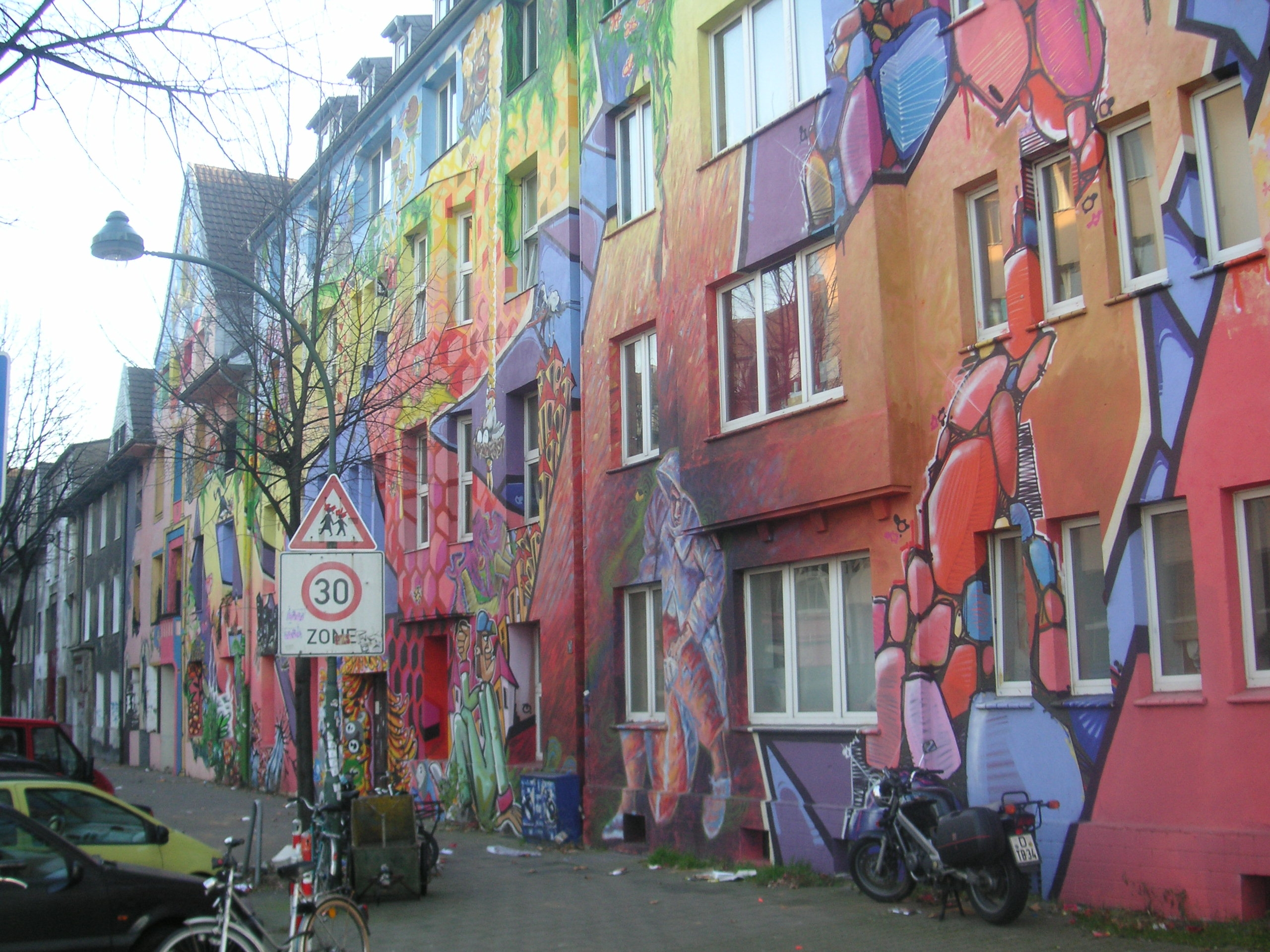

Lierenfeld was a conglomerate of homesteads when it became a part of Düsseldorf in 1384. For a long while Lierenfeld had an agricultural character. It changed in the time of the Industrial Revolution. It became mainly an industrial district. In the 1920s the city of Düsseldorf tried to develop it to a nicer living area with a garden settlement. But Lierenfeld is mainly still an industrial area. There has been a change since the beginning of the 1990s: An old steelwork transmogrified to a great area discothèque – called "Stahlwerk" (steelwork in German), another disco is called "Tor 3" (gate 3 in German). So Lierenfeld became a party and subculture area.
