= Solingen Vogelpark station =

Train station in Solingen, Germany

Solingen Vogelpark
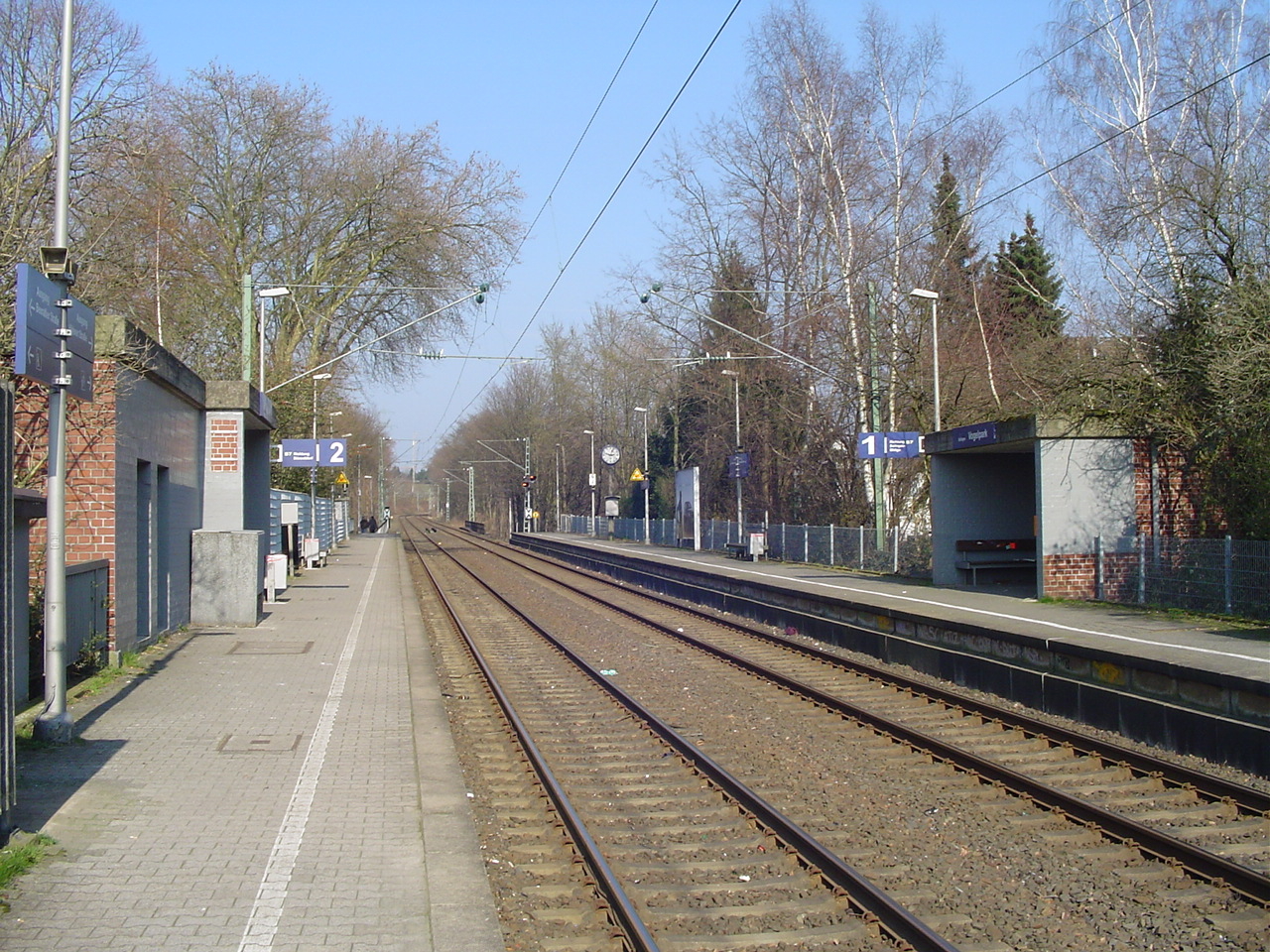
- 2007

General information
- Location: Hildener Str. 1, Hilden, NRW; Germany
- Coordinates: 51°09′59″N 6°59′32″E
- Owner: DB Netz
- Operator: DB Station&Service
- Lines: Düsseldorf–Solingen (KBS 450.1)
- Platforms: 2 side platforms
- Tracks: 2
- Train operators: DB Regio NRW

Construction
- Accessible: Yes

Other information
- Station code: 5881
- DS100 code: KSV
- IBNR: 8006714
- Category: 5
- Fare zone: VRR: 642, 644, and 746; VRS: 1640 and 1740 (VRR transitional tariff)
- Website: www.bahnhof.de

History
- Opened: 1976/77

Services
Preceding station	Rhine-Ruhr S-Bahn	Following station
Solingen Hbf Terminus	S1	Hilden Süd towards Dortmund Hbf
Location
- Location within North Rhine-Westphalia

Solingen Vogelpark station is in the city of Solingen in the German state of North Rhine-Westphalia. It is on the Düsseldorf–Solingen railway, which was opened on 3 January 1894 by the Prussian state railways. The station was also opened in 1976 or 1977 and it is classified by Deutsche Bahn as a category 5 station.

The station is served by line S 1 of the Rhine-Ruhr S-Bahn, running between Düsseldorf and Solingen every 20 minutes at Monday till Friday up to 8 o'clock pm, every 30 minutes during weekend and workingdays after 8 o'clock pm.

It is also served by three bus routes, operated by Rheinbahn: 782 and 783 (both operated at 20-minute intervals to Hilden and Düsseldorf) and 792 (to Haan) operated at 20 to 60 minute intervals).
