= Vennhausen =

City district of Düsseldorf, Germany

Coordinates: 51°12′39″N 6°51′36″E

Map of Düsseldorf, showing Vennhausen (in red) within Borough 8 (in pink)

Vennhausen (German pronunciation: [fɛnˈhaʊzn̩]) is an urban quarter of Düsseldorf, part of Borough 8. It borders on Unterbach, Eller and Gerresheim. It has an area of 3.52 km^{2} (1.36 sq mi), and 10,705 inhabitants (2020).

A few hundred years ago the area was swamp, moor and fen, hence the name for the settlement Vennhausen, which is derived from "Venn", a Low German word for fen. Vennhausen became a settlement much later than its neighbouring boroughs, starting in the Tannenhof. In 1809 Vennhausen became a part of the communal district of Gerresheim due to the Napoleonic area reforms at that time. In 1872 Vennhausen got its own railway station which helped with the transportation of workers, who had settled in Vennhausen, to and from the factories in Gerresheim and Eller. The station was closed in the 1970s. In 1909 Vennhausen became a part of Düsseldorf.

Vennhausen is a green part of Düsseldorf, especially the neighboring Eller Forst (a small wood) and the Unterbacher See (Lake Unterbach) The later has two beaches which are popular recreational areas of Düsseldorf.

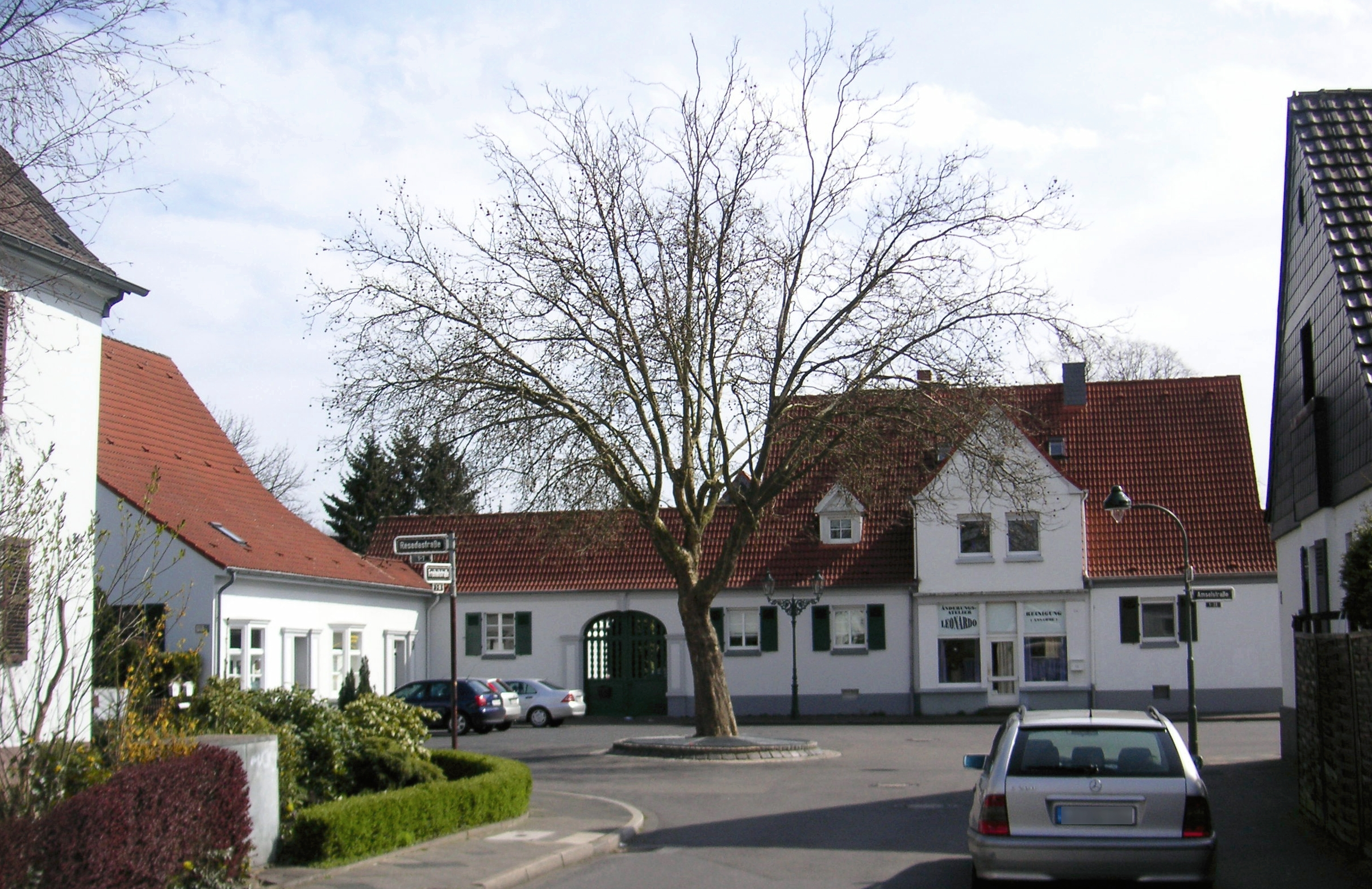
