= Knittkuhl =

Urban quarter of Düsseldorf, Germany

Coordinates: 51°16′3″N 6°52′19″E

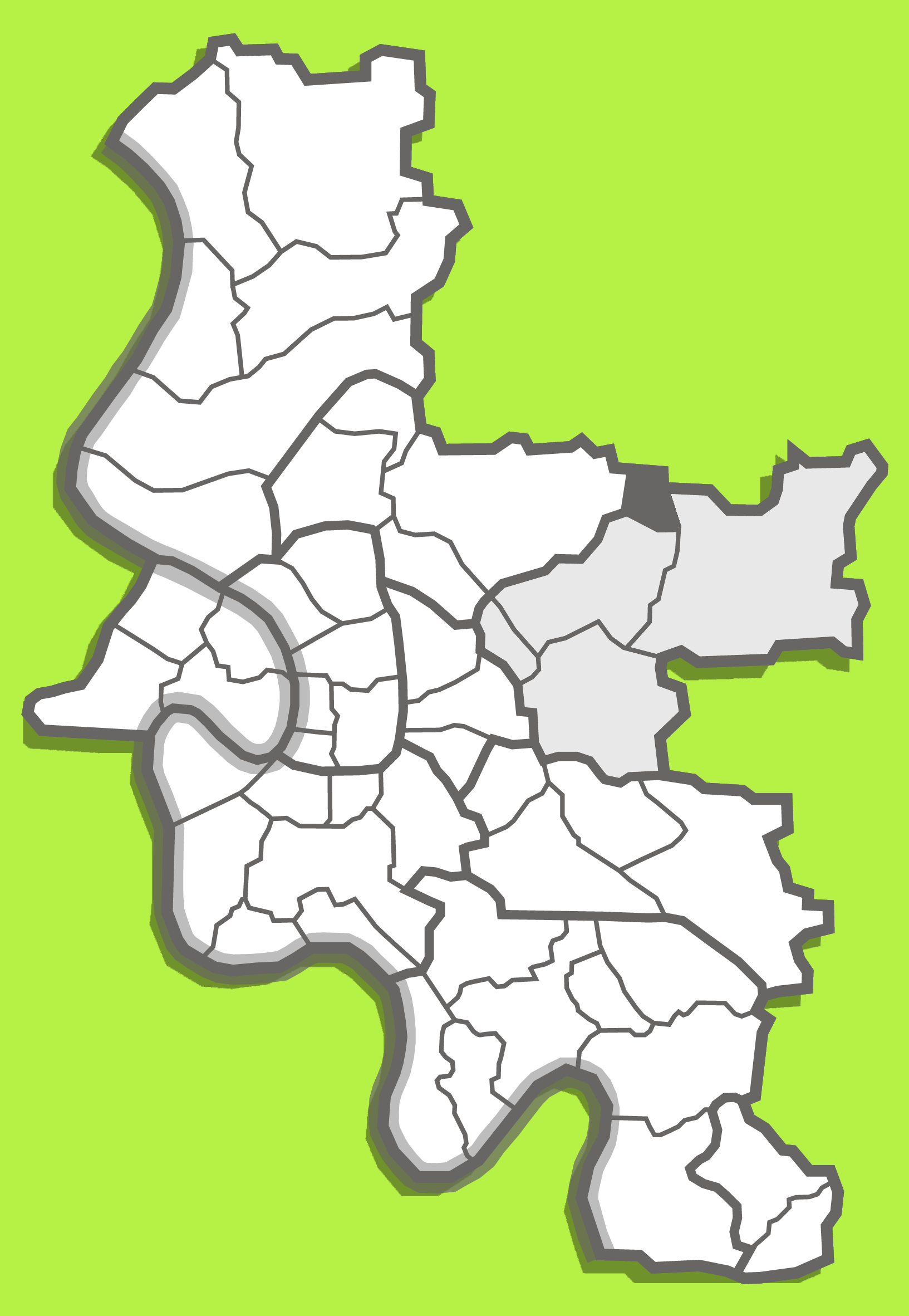
Map of Düsseldorf, showing Knittkuhl (in dark grey) within Borough 7 (in light grey)

Knittkuhl (German pronunciation: [ˈknɪtˌkuːl]) is an urban quarter (Stadtteil) of Düsseldorf, part of Borough 7. It shares borders with the Düsseldorf quarters Rath, Ludenberg and Hubbelrath, and with the town Ratingen. It has an area of 0.85 km^{2} (0.33 sq mi), and 2,047 inhabitants (2020). The Stadtteil was established in 2014, when it was separated from Hubbelrath.
