= 1944 Grafenberg Wald Avro Lancaster shootdown =

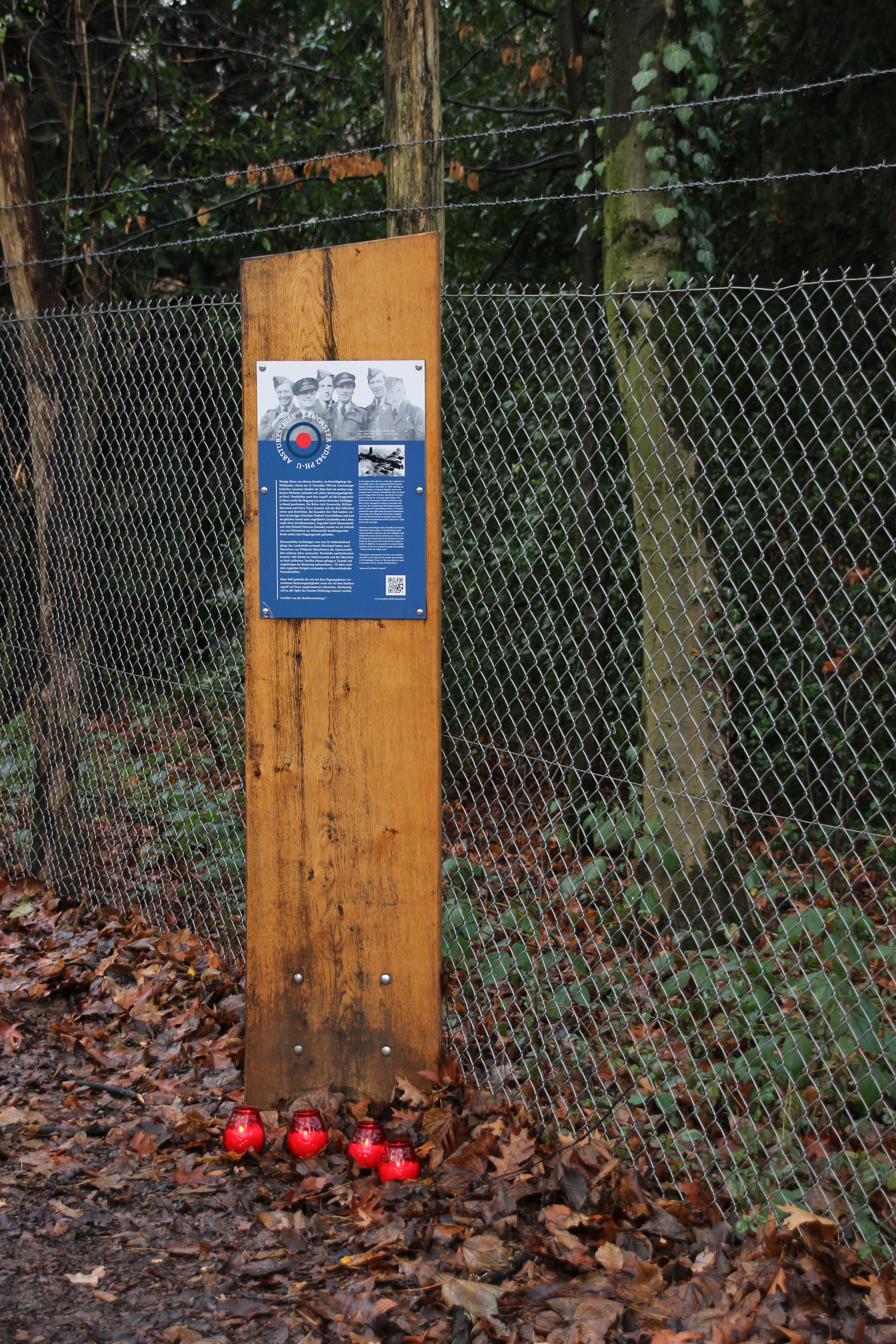
- Memorial plaque at Lindenplätzchen near the main parking lot on Rennbahnstraße

Occurrence
- Date: 12 December 1944
- Summary: Shot down by German night fighter after bombing raid on Essen
- Site: Wildpark im Grafenberger Wald, Ludenberg (Düsseldorf), Nazi Germany

Aircraft
- Aircraft type: Avro Lancaster
- Aircraft name: ND342
- Operator: Royal Air Force
- Registration: PH-U
- Flight origin: RAF Wickenby, England
- Destination: Essen, Germany (target)
- Crew: 8
- Fatalities: 5
- Survivors: 3

The 1944 Grafenberg Wald Avro Lancaster shootdown occurred on 12 December 1944 during World War II when an Avro Lancaster bomber of the Royal Air Force was shot down by a German Luftwaffe night fighter and crashed in the Wildpark im Grafenberger Wald, in Ludenberg, a district of Düsseldorf.

== Mission ==
On the afternoon of 12 December 1944, an Avro Lancaster bomber (serial number ND342, squadron code PH-U) took off from RAF Wickenby in eastern England. The aircraft belonged to either the No. 12 or No. 626 Squadron. Its mission was to bomb the Krupp steelworks in Essen. A total of 540 bombers took part in the raid, which resulted in the deaths of 463 people, including 99 Soviet prisoners of war and a German non-commissioned officer, who were buried when a shelter at the former Zeche Graf Beust collapsed. A war grave site now exists at the location.

=== Shootdown ===
Shortly after dropping its bombs over Essen, the Lancaster was intercepted and shot at by a German night fighter of the I. Gruppe of NJG 11 and caught fire. It crashed near Düsseldorf. The attacking aircraft was a Messerschmitt Bf 109 G-6 (serial number 166455, call sign "Red 4") piloted by Leutnant Gustav Mohr.

== Crew ==
Four crew members managed to bail out several kilometers before the crash:

- Sergeant William Stevenson – flight engineer (RAF)
- Flight Sergeant Jack Kenworthy – bomb aimer (RAF)
- Flight Officer Harry Parry – navigator (RAF)
- Flight Lieutenant Bertram Edward William Hall – wireless operator (RCAF)

The first three were taken prisoner and survived the war. Hall landed in Erkrath-Unterfeldhaus, where he was reportedly given first aid but was later picked up by local NSDAP official Heinrich Thiele and died that same evening under unclear circumstances.

The following crew members did not survive the crash itself:

- Flying Officer Reginald Veitch – pilot (RNZAF)
- Sergeant Leslie Hunt – mid-upper gunner (RAF)
- Pilot Officer John Richard Patterson – rear gunner (RCAF)

Another unidentified crew member exited the aircraft but was found dead about 2.5 km from the crash site with a partially deployed parachute. Two more died near the crash site in the Wildpark. One of them was Reginald Veitch.

== Research ==
Between 2010 and 2014, people from the LVR Office for the Preservation of Monuments in Landschaftsverband Rheinland carried out archaeological surveys of the crash site. Numerous small fragments of the aircraft were recovered from the red deer and wild boar enclosures in the park.

== Memorial ==
On 12 December 2014, the 70th anniversary of the crash, a wreath was laid at the site. Attendees included John Patterson from Canada, the nephew of rear gunner John Richard Patterson.

A memorial plaque was unveiled on 5 April 2017 at Lindenplätzchen near the main parking lot on Rennbahnstraße.
