= Düsseldorf-Grafenberg =

City district of Düsseldorf, Germany

Coordinates: 51°14′27″N 6°49′29″E

Map of Düsseldorf, showing Grafenberg (in red) within Borough 7.

Grafenberg (German pronunciation: [ˈɡʁaːfn̩bɛʁk]) is an urban quarter of Düsseldorf, part of Borough 7. It borders to Gerresheim, Ludenberg, Flingern and Düsseltal. It has an area of 0.91 km^{2} (0.35 sq mi), and 5,845 inhabitants (2020).

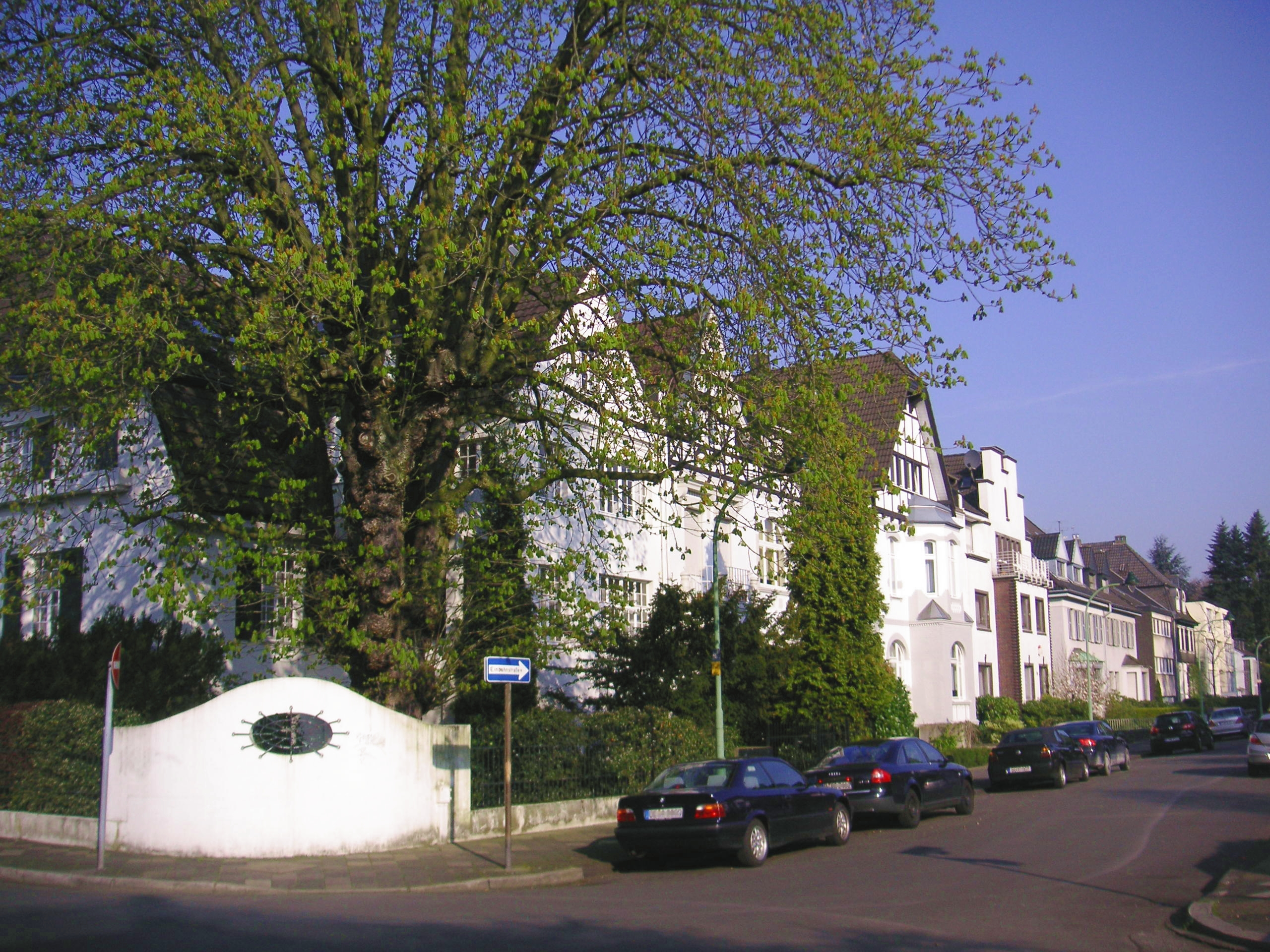

Grafenberg is one of the smallest quarters in Düsseldorf. It is a green area and an expensive place to live (but not as expensive as e.g. Oberkassel).
