= Düsseldorf-Eller Mitte station =

Railway station in Düsseldorf, Germany

Düsseldorf Eller Mitte
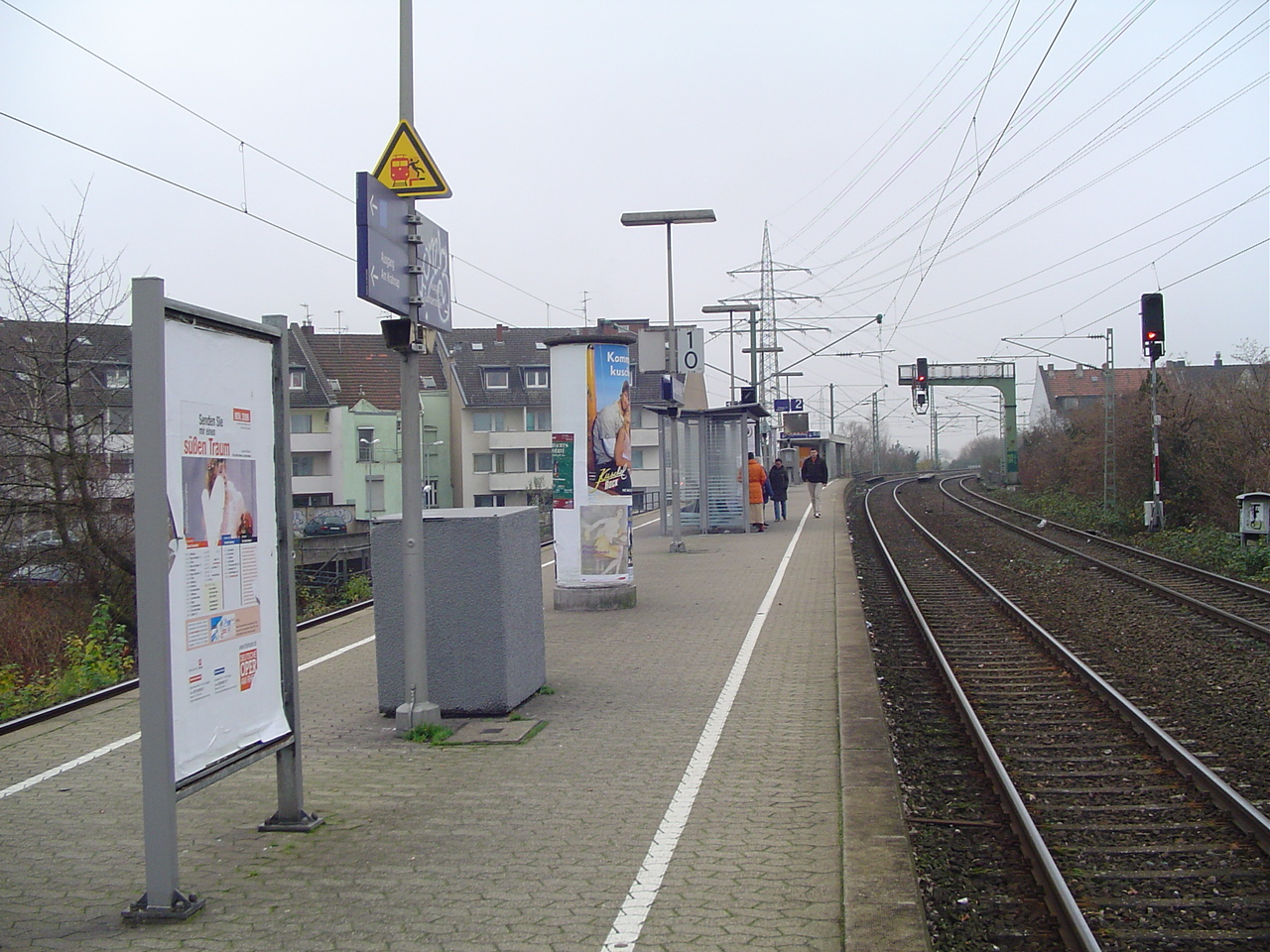

General information
- Location: Düsseldorf-Eller, NRW; Germany
- Coordinates: 51°12′09″N 6°50′28″E
- Lines: Düsseldorf–Solingen (KBS 450.1)
- Platforms: 2

Construction
- Accessible: No

Other information
- Station code: 1408
- DS100 code: KDEM
- IBNR: 8001308
- Category: 5
- Fare zone: VRR: 430; VRS: 1430 (VRR transitional zone)
- Website: www.bahnhof.de

History
- Opened: 28 September 1980

Services
Preceding station	Regiobahn	Following station
Hilden towards Remscheid-Lennep	RE 47	Düsseldorf Hbf Terminus
Preceding station	Rhine-Ruhr S-Bahn	Following station
Düsseldorf-Eller towards Solingen Hbf	S1	Düsseldorf-Oberbilk towards Dortmund Hbf
Preceding station	Rhine-Ruhr Stadtbahn	Following station
Jägerstraße towards Neuss Hbf	U75	Alt Eller towards Eller Vennhauser Allee
Location

Düsseldorf-Eller Mitte station is located in the district of Eller in the German city of Düsseldorf in the German state of North Rhine-Westphalia. It is on the Düsseldorf–Solingen line and is classified by Deutsche Bahn as a category 5 station. It is served by Rhine-Ruhr S-Bahn line S1 every 20 minutes, Stadbahn line U75 every 10 minutes, tram line 701 every 10 minutes, and two bus routes: 723 (every 30 minutes) and 724 (every 20 minutes), operated by Rheinbahn.

Since December 2022, the station is also served hourly by regional service RE 47 between Düsseldorf Hauptbahnhof and Remscheid-Lennep, operated by Regiobahn.
