= Hubbelrath =

Urban quarter of Düsseldorf, Germany

Coordinates: 51°15′24″N 6°54′39″E

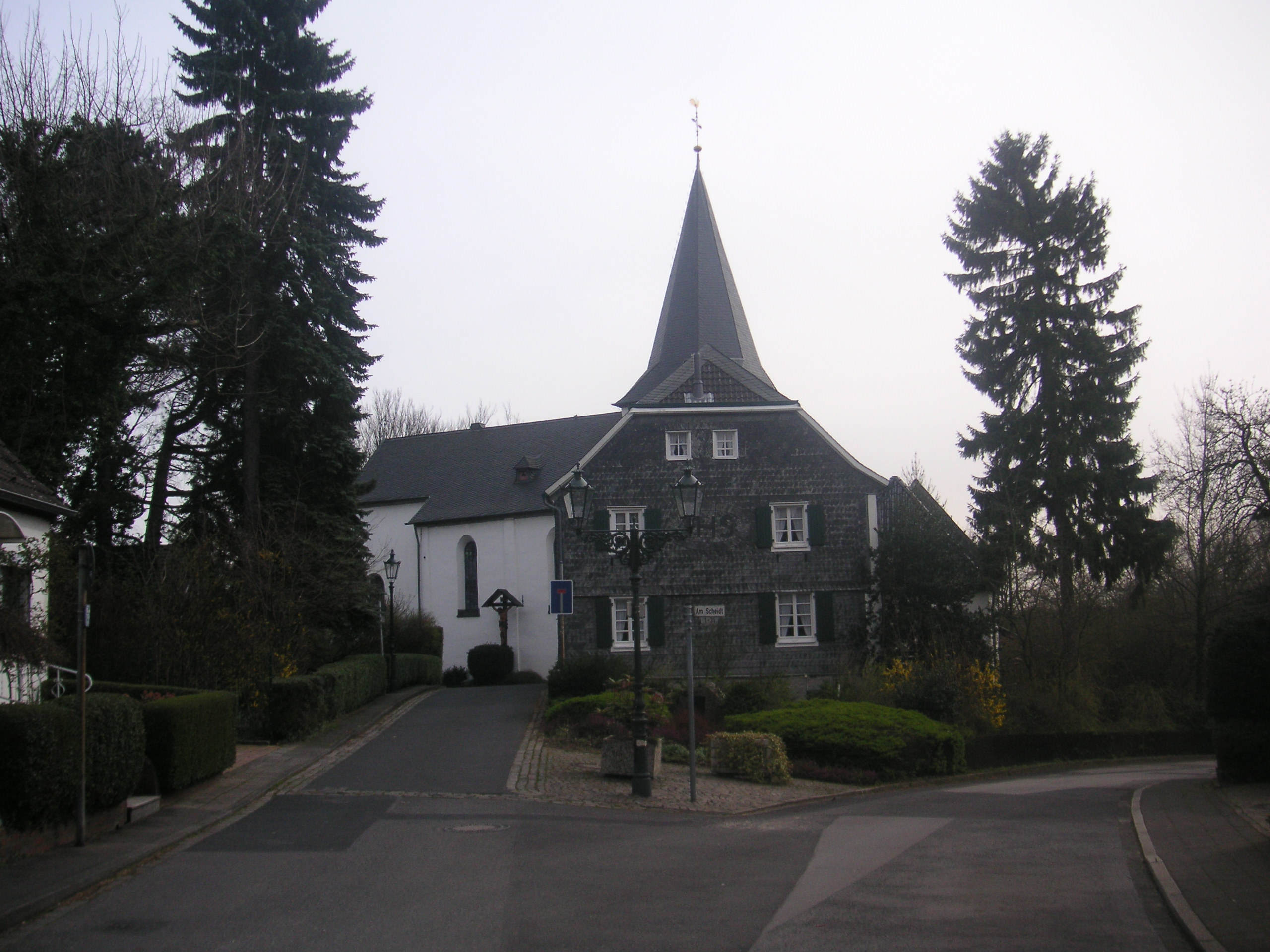

Hubbelrath (German pronunciation: [ˈhʊbl̩ʁaːt]) is an urban quarter (Stadtteil) of Düsseldorf, part of Borough 7. It borders to Gerresheim, Mettmann, Erkrath and Ratingen. It has an area of 12.92 km^{2} (4.99 sq mi), and 1,632 inhabitants (2020).

Map of Düsseldorf, showing Hubbelrath (in red) within Borough 7 (in pink). Situation before 2014.

The name comes from the old estate Hupoldesroth, which was written mentioned first time in 950 A.D. Hubbelrath was a farming settlement with an old romanic church. After Hubbelrath became a part of Düsseldorf in 1975 Hubbelrath got three new settlements: Knittkuhl - its nucleus was the estate Knittkuhl, but it hasn't been a settlement before it became a part of Düsseldorf, the Stratenhof-settlement and the settlement Rotthäuser Weg. Knittkuhl was split from Hubbelrath to form a separate Stadtteil in 2014. In Hubbelrath there are a green fee and a barracks of the Bundeswehr.
