= Hilden station =

Railway station in Hilden, Germany

Hilden
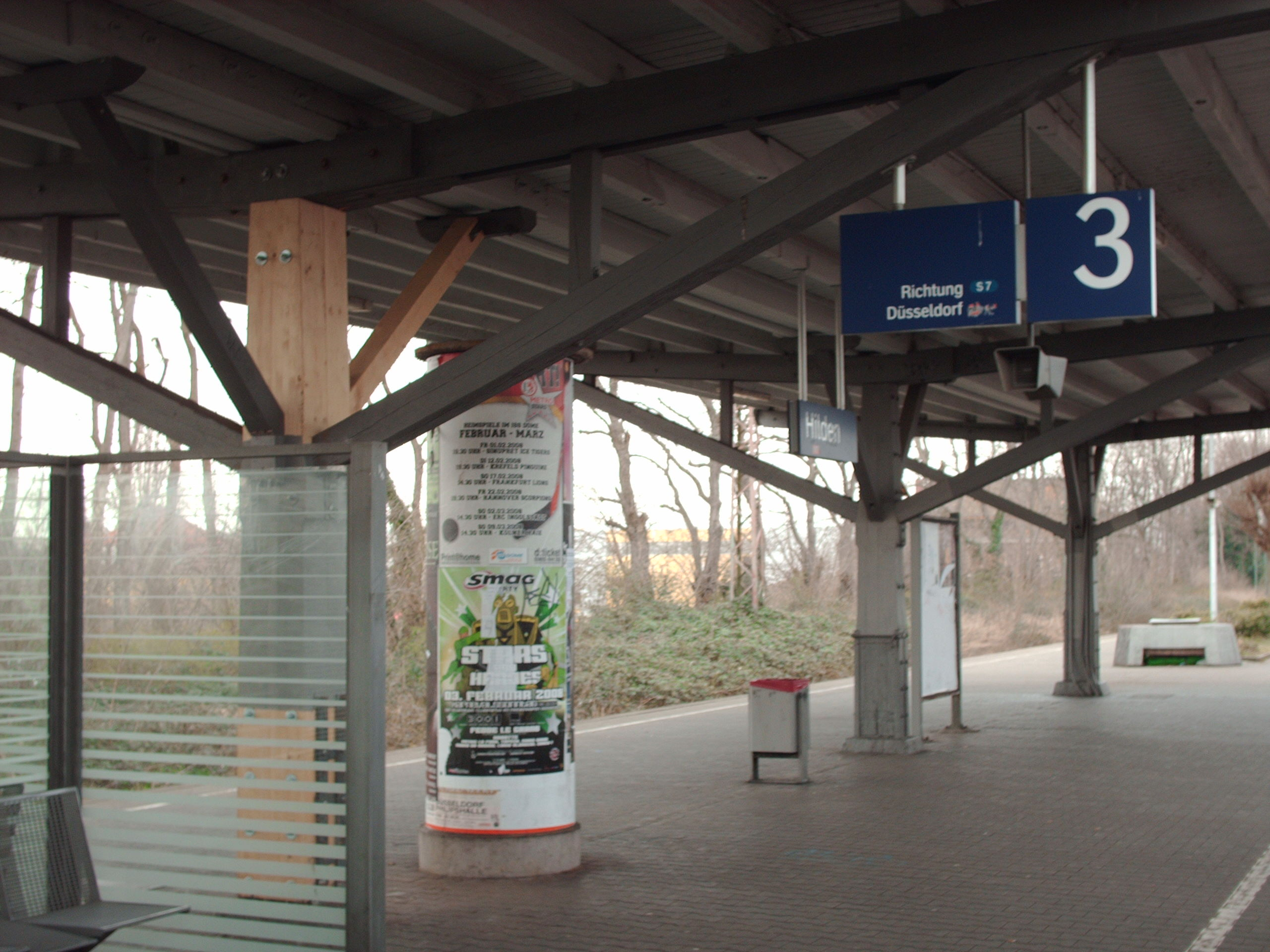

General information
- Location: Hilden, North Rhine-Westphalia; Germany
- Coordinates: 51°10′02″N 6°55′21″E
- Lines: Düsseldorf–Solingen (KBS 450.1)
- Platforms: 2

Construction
- Accessible: Yes

Other information
- Station code: 2763
- DS100 code: KHI
- IBNR: 8000388
- Category: 4
- Fare zone: VRR: 644; VRS: 1640 (VRR transitional zone)
- Website: www.bahnhof.de

History
- Opened: 1874

Services
Preceding station	Regiobahn	Following station
Solingen Hbf towards Remscheid-Lennep	RE 47	Düsseldorf-Eller Mitte towards Düsseldorf Hbf
Preceding station	Rhine-Ruhr S-Bahn	Following station
Hilden Süd towards Solingen Hbf	S1	Düsseldorf-Eller towards Dortmund Hbf
Location

Hilden station is located in the city of Hilden in the German state of North Rhine-Westphalia. It is on the Düsseldorf–Solingen line and is classified by Deutsche Bahn as a category 4 station. It is served by Rhine-Ruhr S-Bahn line S1 every 20 minutes, and by three bus routes (O3, 783 and 784), operated by Rheinbahn, each at 20-minute intervals.

Since December 2022, the station is also served hourly by regional service RE 47 between Düsseldorf Hauptbahnhof and Remscheid-Lennep, operated by Regiobahn.
