= Borough 8 (Düsseldorf) =

Stadtbezirk 8
- Borough of Düsseldorf
- Location of Stadtbezirk 8 within Düsseldorf
- Interactive map of Stadtbezirk 8
- Location within Germany Location within North Rhine-Westphalia
- Coordinates: 51°12′33″N 6°49′39″E
- Country: Germany
- State: North Rhine-Westphalia
- District: Urban district
- City: Düsseldorf
- Subdivisions: 4 quarters

Area
  - Total: 20.96 km^{2} (8.09 sq mi)

Population (2020-12-31)
  - Total: 60,768
  - Density: 2,899/km^{2} (7,509/sq mi)
- Time zone: UTC+01:00 (CET)
  - Summer (DST): UTC+02:00 (CEST)

Borough 8 (German: Stadtbezirk 8) is a southeastern borough of Düsseldorf, the state capital of North Rhine-Westphalia, Germany. The borough covers an area of 20.96 square kilometres and (as of December 2020) has about 61,000 inhabitants. The borough borders with the Düsseldorf boroughs 2, 3, 7 and 9. To the East the borough borders with the rural district of Mettmann.

== Subdivisions ==
Borough 8 is made up of four Stadtteile (city parts):

| # | City part | Population (2020) | Area (km²) | Pop. per km² |
|---|---|---|---|---|
| 081 | Lierenfeld | 11,108 | 2.44 | 4,515 |
| 082 | Eller | 31,153 | 5.91 | 5,427 |
| 083 | Vennhausen | 10,705 | 3.52 | 2,999 |
| 084 | Unterbach | 7,802 | 9.09 | 843 |

== See also ==
- Boroughs of Düsseldorf
