= Borough 7 (Düsseldorf) =

Stadtbezirk 7
- Borough of Düsseldorf
- Location of Stadtbezirk 7 within Düsseldorf
- Interactive map of Stadtbezirk 7
- Location within Germany Location within North Rhine-Westphalia
- Coordinates: 51°14′13″N 6°51′51″E
- Country: Germany
- State: North Rhine-Westphalia
- District: Urban district
- City: Düsseldorf
- Subdivisions: 5 quarters

Area
  - Total: 27.62 km^{2} (10.66 sq mi)

Population (2020-12-31)
  - Total: 47,072
  - Density: 1,704/km^{2} (4,414/sq mi)
- Time zone: UTC+01:00 (CET)
  - Summer (DST): UTC+02:00 (CEST)

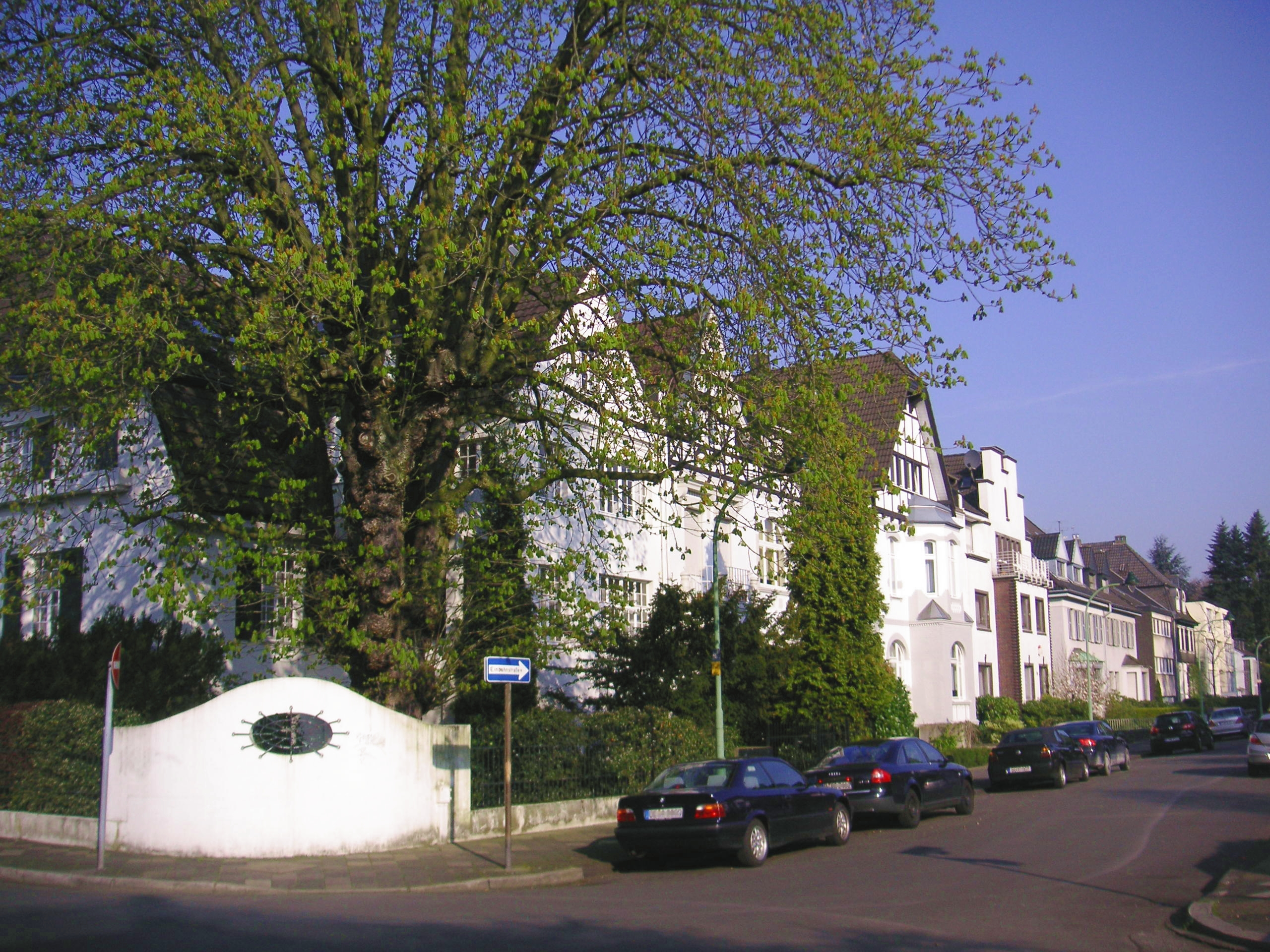
typical residential street in Grafenberg

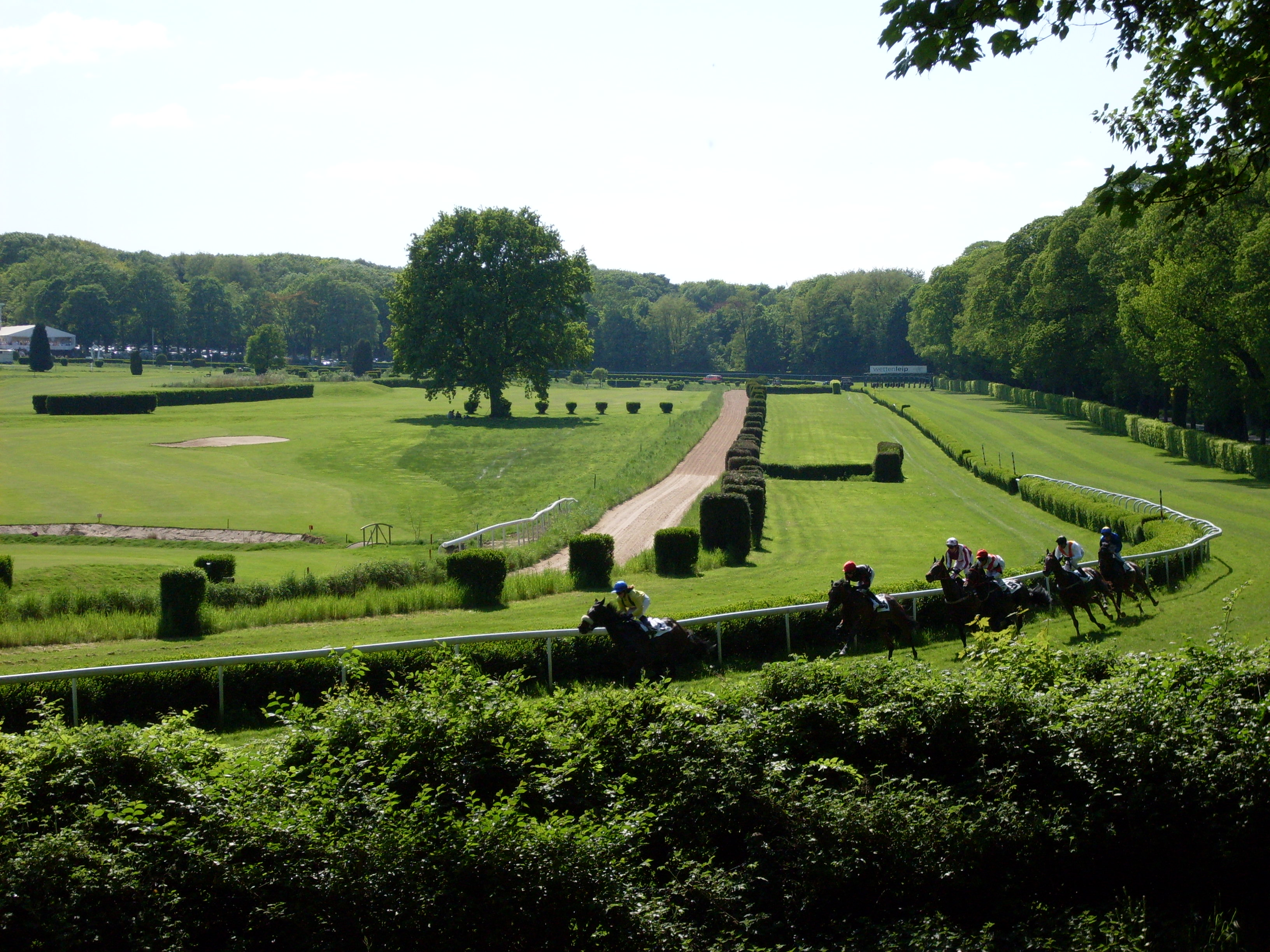
Düsseldorf-Grafenberg Racecourse in Grafenberg

Borough 7 (German: Stadtbezirk 7) is an eastern borough of Düsseldorf, the state capital of North Rhine-Westphalia, Germany. The borough covers an area of 27.97 square kilometres and (as of December 2020) has about 47,000 inhabitants. The borough borders with the Düsseldorf boroughs 8, 2 and 6 to the South, West and North. To the East the borough borders with the rural district of Mettmann.

== Subdivisions ==
Borough 7 is made up of five Stadtteile (city parts):

#	City part	Population (2020)	Area (km²)	Pop. per km²
071	Gerresheim	29,641	6.68	4,385
072	Grafenberg	5,845	0.914	6,423
073	Ludenberg	7,907	6.26	1,263
074	Hubbelrath	1,632	12.92	126
075	Knittkuhl	2,047	0.847	2,380

== Places of interest ==
=== Arts, Culture and Entertainment ===
- Düsseldorf-Grafenberg Racecourse, Grafenberg

=== Landmarks ===
- St. Margareta, Gerresheim

=== Parks and open spaces ===
- Ostpark

== Transportation ==
The borough is served by numerous railway stations and highway. Stations include Düsseldorf-Gerresheim and both Düsseldorf Stadtbahn light rail- and Rheinbahn tram-stations. The borough can also be reached via Bundesautobahn 3 as well as Bundesstraße 7 and 8.

== See also ==
- Boroughs of Düsseldorf
