= Düsseldorf-Eller station =

Railway station in Düsseldorf, Germany

Düsseldorf Eller
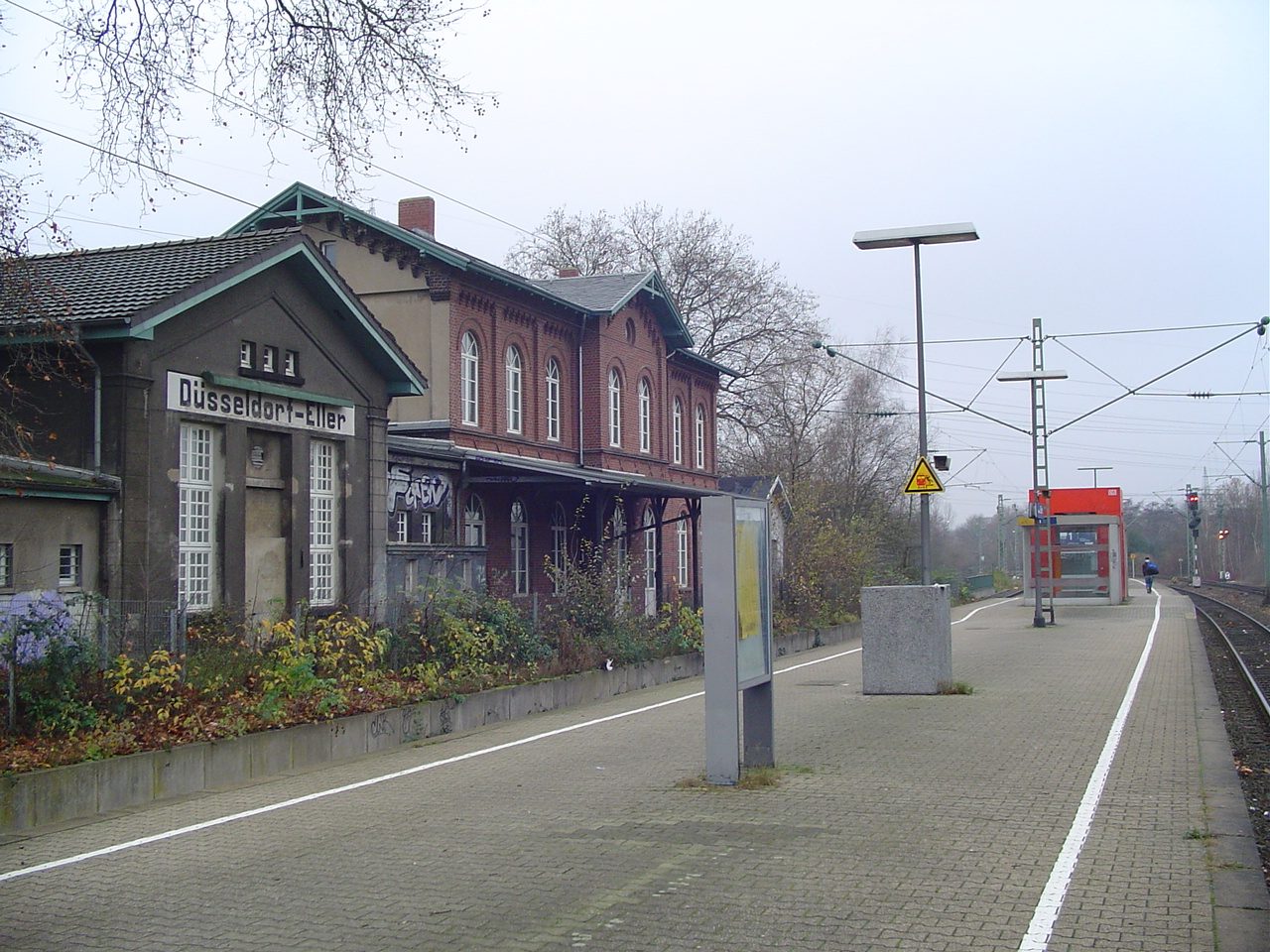

General information
- Location: Düsseldorf-Eller, NRW; Germany
- Coordinates: 51°12′08″N 6°51′09″E
- Lines: Düsseldorf–Solingen (KBS 450.1)
- Platforms: 2

Construction
- Accessible: Yes

Other information
- Station code: 1407
- DS100 code: KDE
- IBNR: 8001587
- Category: 5
- Fare zone: VRR: 430 and 530; VRS: 1430 and 1530 (VRR transitional zone)
- Website: www.bahnhof.de

History
- Opened: 1874

Services
Preceding station	Rhine-Ruhr S-Bahn	Following station
Hilden towards Solingen Hbf	S1	Düsseldorf-Eller Mitte towards Dortmund Hbf
Location

Düsseldorf-Eller station is located in the district of Eller in the German city of Düsseldorf in the German state of North Rhine-Westphalia. It is on the Düsseldorf–Solingen line and is classified by Deutsche Bahn as a category 5 station.

== Location ==
The station is located in the east of the district Düsseldorf-Eller. It is elevated above Vennhauser Allee. The station has a central platform with access to Vennhauser Allee.

== History ==
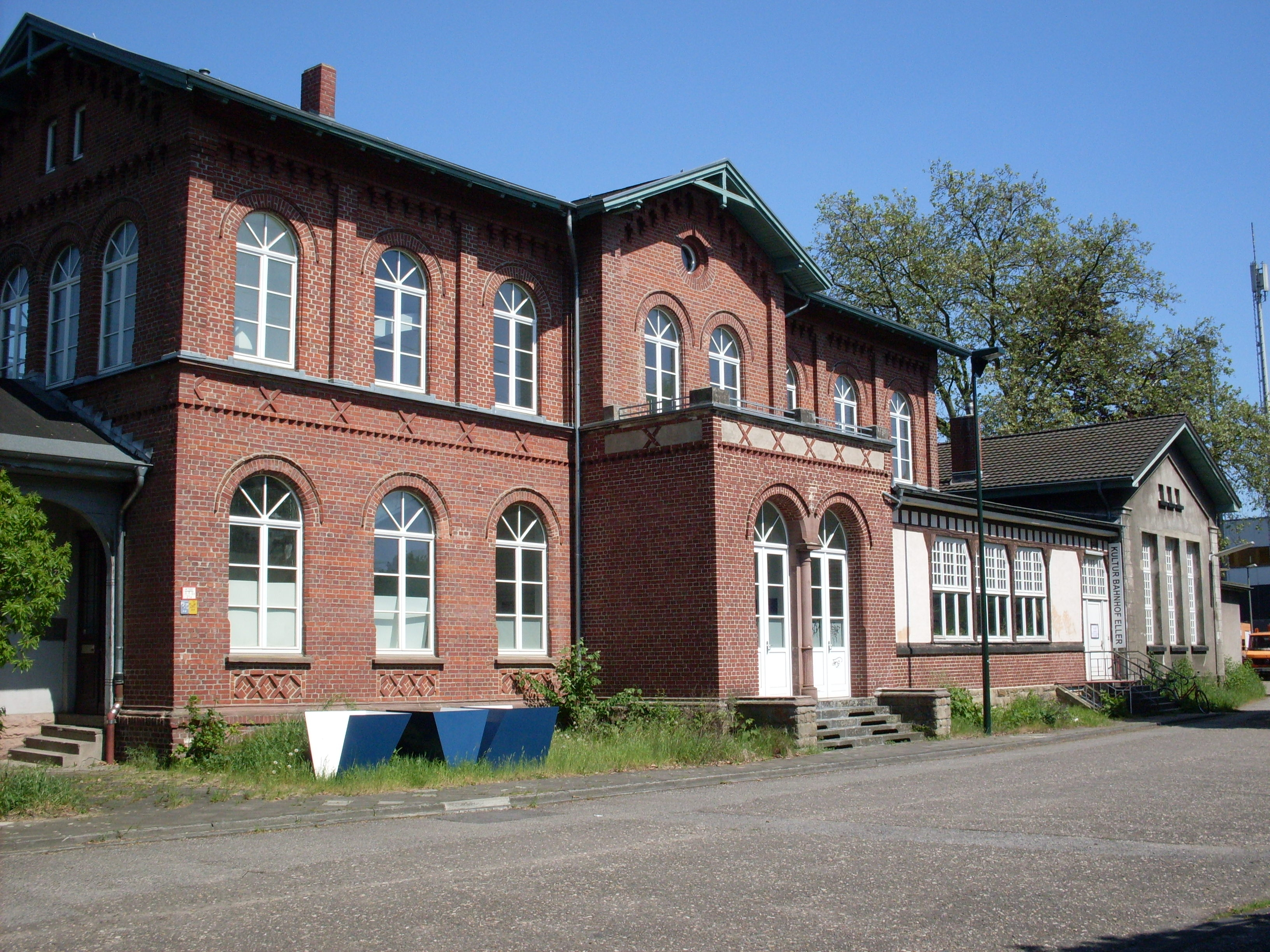
Kulturbahnhof Eller

The station building was built of brick in 1872. In 1909, a waiting room was added. By 1975, the station building was no longer used for railway purposes, but instead it was used for artists' studios. In 1982, it had its first public exhibition, which was followed by over 100 other shows, which were attended by more than 400 artists. In 1986, Freundeskreis Kulturbahnhof Eller e.V. (Friends of the Culture Station of Eller) was founded.

On 1 April 1985, the old station building was registered on Düsseldorf's heritage list in the category of technical monuments.

== Services ==
The station is served by Rhine-Ruhr S-Bahn line S1 every 20 minutes, and by five bus routes (M1, 722, 730, 735 and 736), operated by Rheinbahn, at intervals between 10 and 60 minutes.
