= Düsseldorf-Unterbach =

City district of Düsseldorf, Germany

Coordinates: 51°12′22″N 6°54′00″E

Map of Düsseldorf, showing Unterbach (in red) within Borough 8 (in pink)

Unterbach (German pronunciation: [ˈʊntɐbax]) is a quarter (Stadtteil) of Düsseldorf, part of Borough 8. Until a local reorganisation in 1975, it was a part of Erkrath, Germany. A portion of the pre-1975 Unterbach remains as the quarter of Erkrath-Unterfeldhaus. The eastern end of the borough of Düsseldorf-Vennhausen was attached to Unterbach during the reorganisation since it was already culturally associated with Unterbach.

== History ==
The name of the local part comes from the knights van Unterbeke, whose seat was the House of Unterbach – an old water castle, first mentioned as seat of the knights in 1169. The gallery of the lords of the House of Unterbach and their coats of arms are to be discovered elsewhere in Unterbach on the monument, which also serves as homeland and war memorial. The columns of the monument bear the names in time-correct sequence in stone. Further local historical buildings of Unterbach are mentioned at the former customs office at the eastern local entrance "at the Zault", the tubing mill and the association house.

=== House Unterbach ===
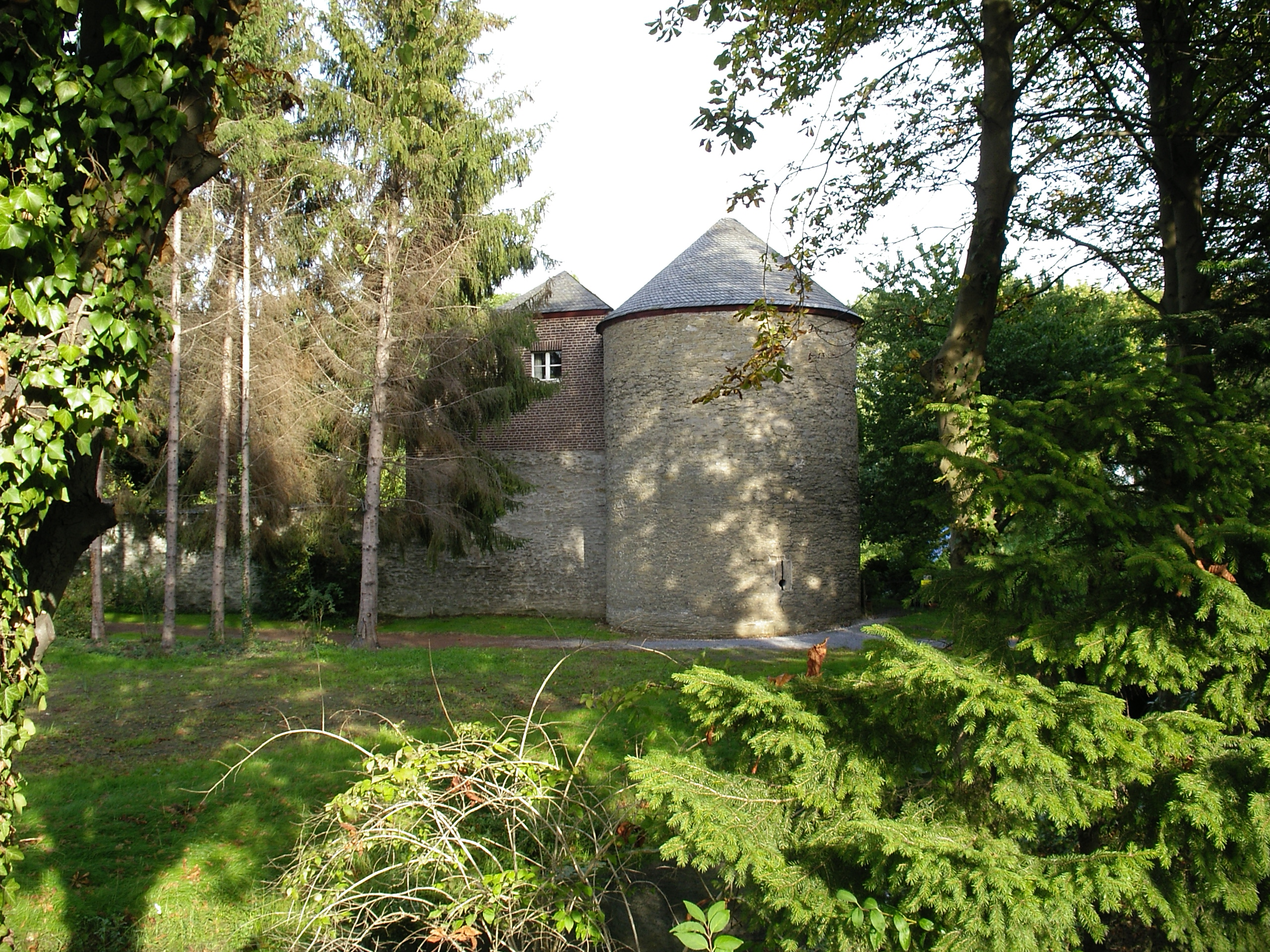
Haus Unterbach

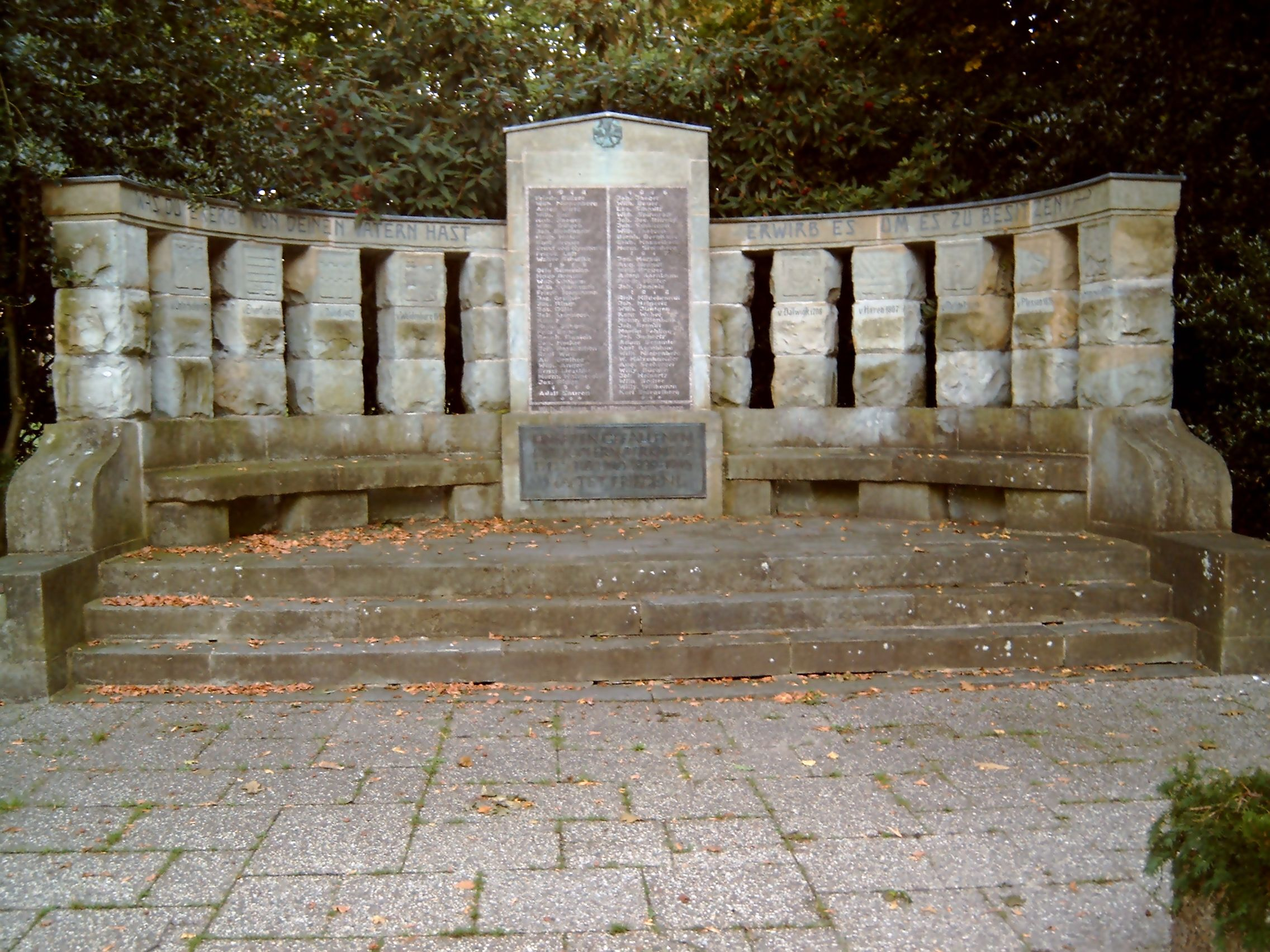
Monument Unterbach

House Unterbach was probably established in the times of the Carolingian dynasty. Probably from fear for the Hungarians, who burned down Gerresheim and its neighboring places nearly completely, the area was for the first time removed around 900 AD to the castle. As a knight's seat it is recorded in 1169 for the first time. Probably around 1300 it came then to the today's substantial development of the attachment with encircling walls up to 1.20 meters thick, four towers with walls up to two meters thick, surrounded by a broad water ditch. Parts of the circulating wall and three of the towers are still perceptible today, i.e. a gate tower, a court tower and a round tower. A further round tower, which was formerly on the left, was torn off at the height of the manor-house and integrated into this. Parts of the course bridge mechanism are likewise still to be seen in the gate tower. Beside it are still further authentic knight material stores in the towers. The towers are 10 meters high up to 9 meters in diameter. Probably one of them was in former times once higher. The garden plantings of the castle and the surrounding area were created by the well-known landscape architect Maximilian Friedrich Weyhe, to whose numerous works also belongs the Hofgarten and the world-famous Königsallee.

== Geography ==
Unterbach lies in the southeast of the city Düsseldorf and is the fifth-largest quarter of Düsseldorf, with an area of 9.09 km^{2} (3.51 sq mi). A large part of this area is the local recreation area Lake Unterbach (Unterbacher See). In Unterbach just like in neighboring Vennhausen around the lake a moorland colonizing one operated approximately, of it street names witnessed such as Vennstrasse (fen street), as well as large ones and small peat break. Details are however not well known. Unterbach is separated by a forest belt from the close-lying boroughs of Düsseldorf. The first hills of the Bergisches Land terminate here at the lower Rhine level and give Unterbach, in comparison to remaining Düsseldorf, a hilly character. Thus Unterbach climbs from here, beginning on Lake Unterbach at the foot of the Korresberg, rising behind the closed land development in the city of Erkrath, to a height of 100 meters.

This location, the local recreation area of Unterbacher lake/Eller forest and the partial Unterbach forest lying on Erkrath's area makes it into a borough with a high standard of living. Unterbach has 7,802 inhabitants (2020) with a relatively low population density of 843 inhabitants per km^{2}.

=== Lake Unterbach ===
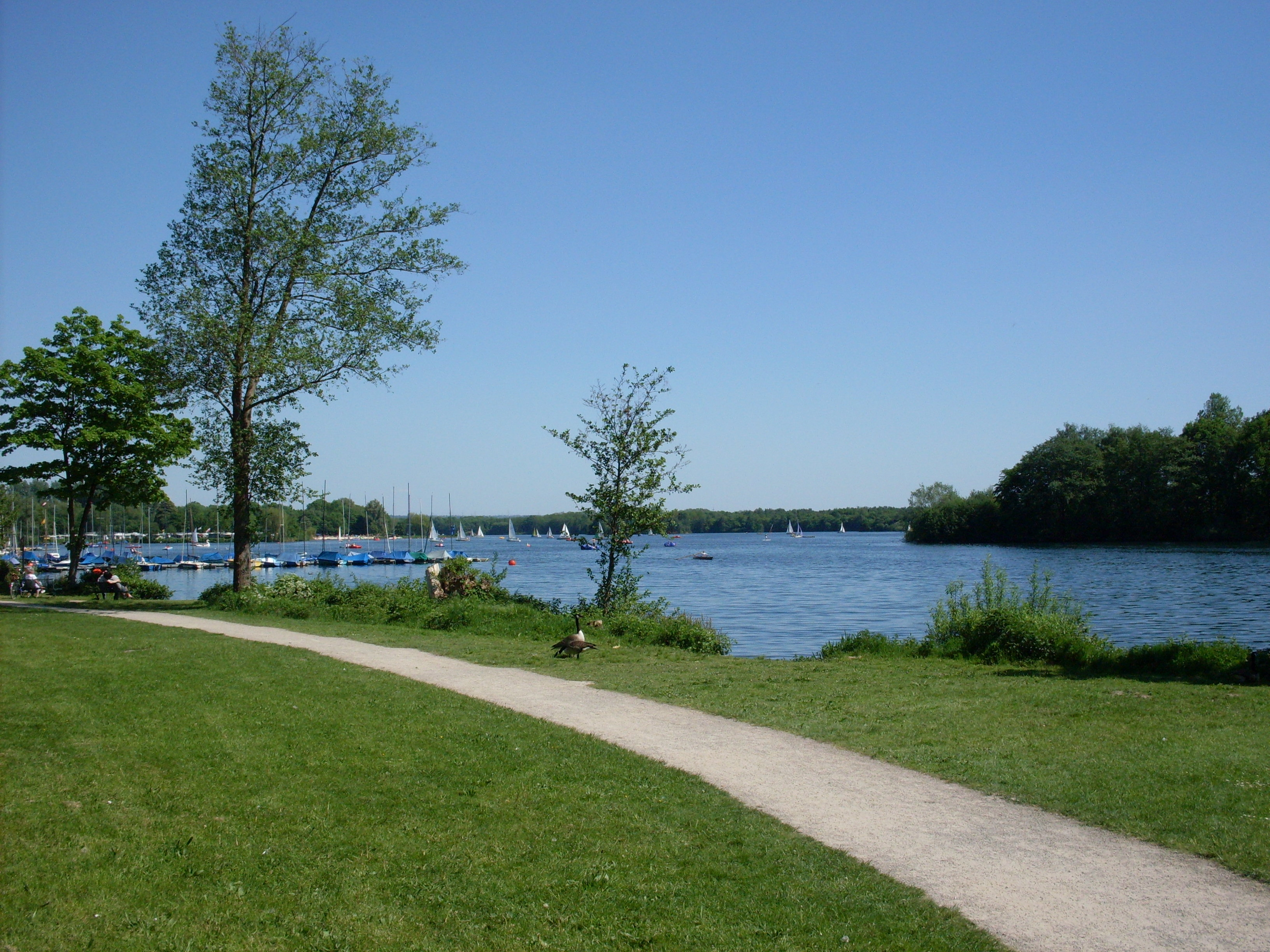
Lake Unterbach (Unterbacher See) northern lakeshore

The Lake Unterbach (Unterbacher See), in the local linguistic usage excavator hole, is a former excavator lake in the quarter Unterbach in the southeast of Düsseldorf. It is 87 hectares large and up to 13.4 m deep. Around the lake lies the protected area Eller forest, which consists to a large extent of sparse woods. Within this forest there are numerous moving and cycle tracks. In the lake are four islands proven as bird protecting area. Water does not have an above ground inlet, it is fed only by groundwater. It was created by excavating for gravel and sands between 1926 and 1973. During the World War II there was a fake airfield of the German air force put there for the deception of allied bombers. With the surface removal of gravel, groundwater flows through the lake and determines also its water level.

The lake represents an important local recreation area for the region of Düsseldorf. On the north bank are also an observation deck with restaurant, a mini golf course and a small sailing boat port with boat rental business as well as a rowboat port used by schools from Düsseldorf and Erkrath. There is a campground on the south and there are two beaches in the north and the south, including a nude beach at the southern beach. The Lake Unterbach is administered by a public society, which was created on 7 February 1956 by the neighboring cities Düsseldorf, Erkrath and Hilden.

== Culture ==
Unterbach has retained its village character with its active association and church life, firmly established as a geographically separate quarter of Düsseldorf.

=== Carnival ===
Unterbach has maintained for itself a singular character within Düsseldorf from old times in regard to the carnival: It is the only quarter with an absolutely independent carnival board, its own pair of princes and separation. Here also is the origin in the region of Düsseldorf for the dialect expressions "Halven cock" and "old shot". The latter had its greatest success with "the stars sparkle", which was originally the slogan song of the session 1997 in the Unterbach carnival. The meetings and the procession in the Unterbach carnival extend into the surrounding cities.

The coat of arms animal of Unterbach is the donkey, presented as jumping over the donkey brook. At the shopping centre, "at the Breidenplatz", a donkey cast in bronze is set up in the Unterbacher. The Carnival fool's call in Unterbach is the donkey sound "I-A" unlike the Rhineland "Helau" in the rest of Düsseldorf. Also the carnival procession is led off by a living donkey. New citizens can let themselves be struck (tied to?) to the donkey. This donkey culture finds its origin in the fact that Düsseldorf was partly built from and on the sand, which originated from the Auskiesung (dredging) of the Unterbacher lake and its environs. The sand was transported in former times along the donkey brook and further the today still existing arterial road to Düsseldorf called Sandträgerweg (sand-carriers way) on the backs of donkeys. The remark "Unterbach's donkeys are coming" referred not only to the animals.

The donkey brook flows through the neighboring borough of Eller as well as its lock park behind Unterbach. There it flows into the southern Düssel.

=== Sports ===
The TV Unterbach 1905 announced the place country wide in the trampoline sports with a first success of a German pupil master and a third place of the pupil crew championship achieved at the same time in 1968. With the further ascent the association became in the years 1978, 1979, 1980, 1982 and 1984 in this discipline of German masters, placed many further German and European titles, a vice-world champion as well as the majority of the German national team. By the allocation to Düsseldorf in the framework to the association a large practice hall lying in Unterbach is missing to the local reorganisation and does gymnastics at present in the second federal league.

== Reorganisation ==
Unterbach was moved from Erkrath to Düsseldorf in 1975. A part of Unterbach, called Unterfeldhaus, remained in Erkrath. Since this reorganisation, the inhabitants of the two former Unterbach appear main street sides in different cities. Also the House Unterbach – as the nucleus of Unterbach – is on the "wrong" roadside and thus in Erkrath. The parts of the Unterbach forest and the sports field of the soccer association sports club Unterbach are on Erkrath's area. Practically this separation however never manifested itself. The cultural, church and association life turn out as in only one local part. Besides many students from Unterbach visit the resuming schools in Erkrath.
