= Düsseldorf-Eller =

City district of Düsseldorf, Germany

Coordinates: 51°12′00″N 6°50′30″E

Map of Düsseldorf, showing Eller (in red) within Borough 8 (in pink)

Eller (German pronunciation: [ˈɛlɐ]) is an urban quarter of Düsseldorf, part of Borough 8. It is located southeast of the city centre. Eller has been a part of Düsseldorf since the year 1909. It has an area of 5.91 km^{2} (2.28 sq mi), and 31,153 inhabitants (2020).

== History ==
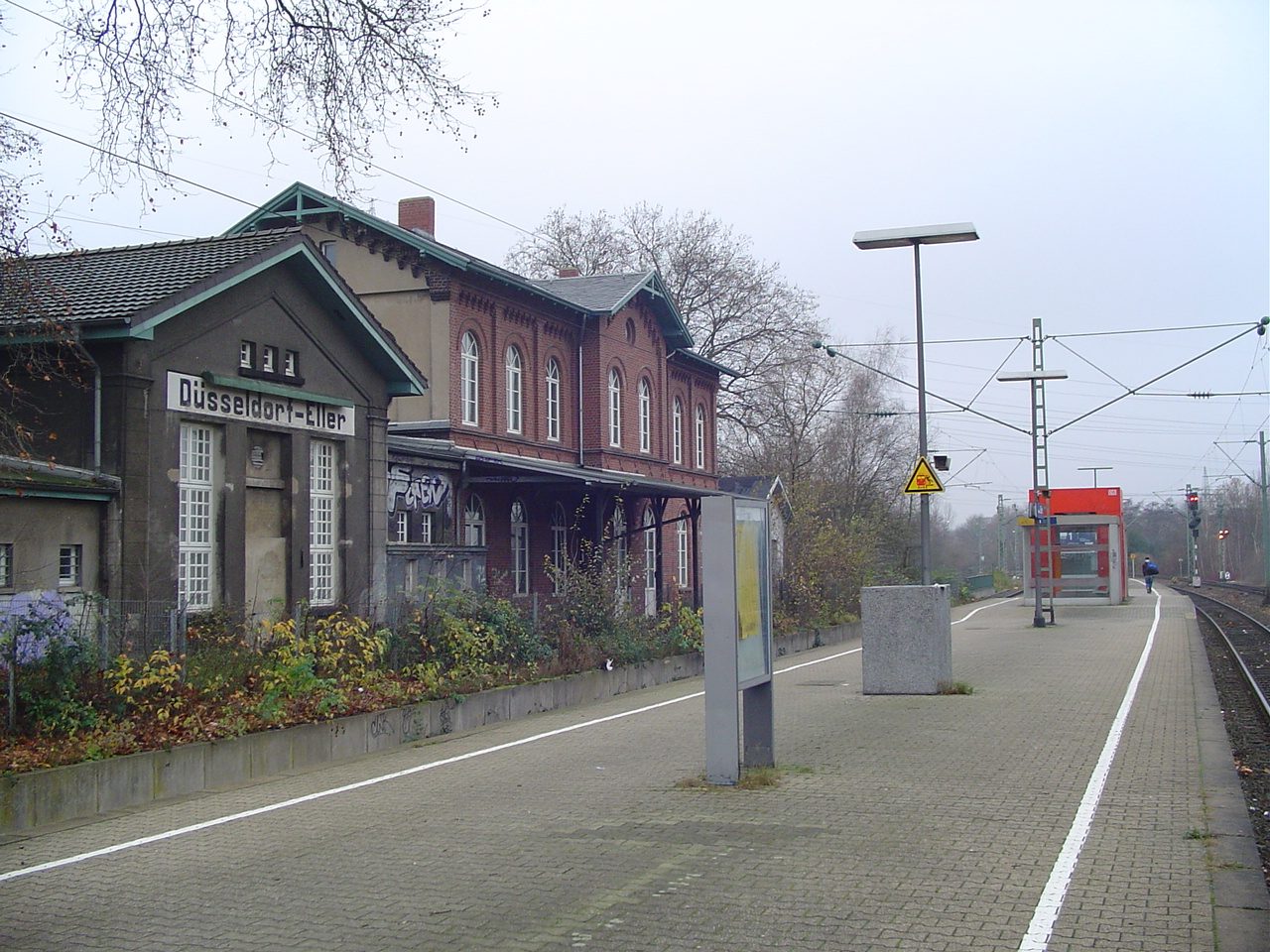
Düsseldorf-Eller station

Archeological findings tell of a continuous settlement in Eller dating from the second century A.D. There are no indications if it were originally a Roman or Germanic settlement. Eller was recorded first time in 1218 as "Elnere" in a register of the convent of Gerresheim. In 1151 there was a knight mentioned as Gumpert of Elnere as a sub-reeve of the reeve of Hitdorf. He was witness for the City rights of Düsseldorf in 1288.

Nucleus of Eller is today's Alt-Eller (Old Eller).

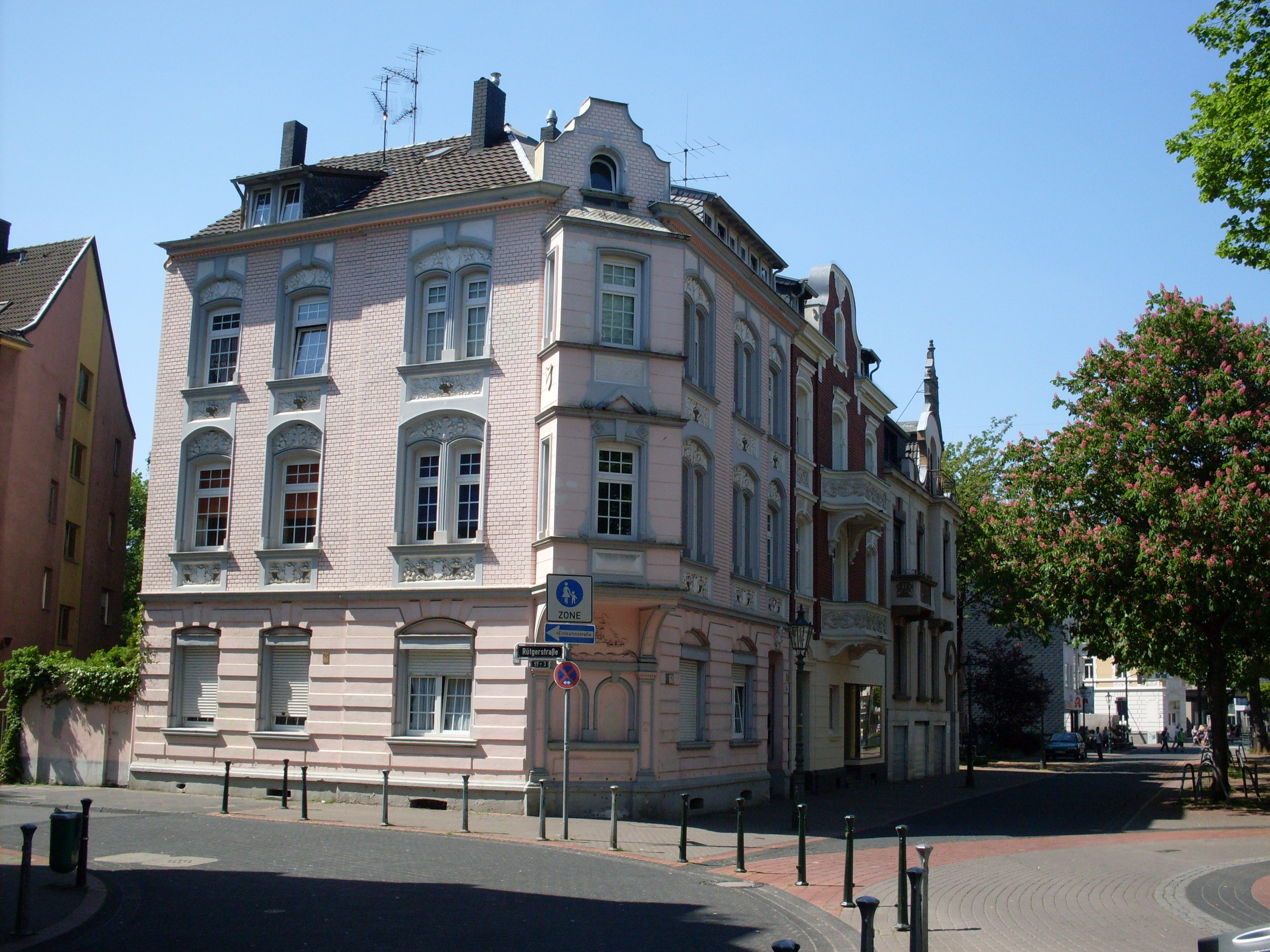
Gertrudisplatz

The neighbouring castle of Eller was mentioned for the first time in 1309 and enlarged in 1469. It was demolished in 1826, except for the tower and replaced by a new castle.

Since 1350 there had been a chapel in the castle, but it was the only church in Eller until there a Roman Catholic church was constructed during the years 1827 to 1829 by Anton Walger, planned by Karl Friedrich Schinkel. It was damaged in 1900 and replaced by a new church.

From 1843 to 1882 the Princess Luise of Prussia lived in Eller. It was during the time of the Industrial Revolution. In the year 1870 Eller had 1,000 inhabitants. Since 1872 two railway lines ran across Eller, which obtained its own station.

In 1896 Eller obtained an office for the town's mayor.

In 1901 Eller obtained a new Catholic church and a new mayor's office, in 1905 a Protestant church was added.

Eller became a borough of Düsseldorf in 1909. In that year Eller had about 10,000 inhabitants and an area of 6.15 km^{2}.

Eller was widely destroyed in World War II. The central church St. Gertrudis was destroyed nearly completely in 1944. WW II ended for Eller on 17 April 1945 when American troops reached it.

Eller was rebuilt and the park of the castle reopened in 1950. Since 1950 the park has been a public one. Starting from the 1950s there were new settlements created in the south of Eller. It got some new catholic churches in that time, but in 1996 one of them was given up.

In 1976 the new comprehensive school Kikweg was constructed in Eller. It was one of the two first comprehensive schools in the state of North Rhine-Westphalia. The building was created in the brutalism style, following extended debate.

== Sights ==
- Eller Castle (1824-1826), classicistic Hall with park, created by Maximilian Friedrich Weyhe.
- Mayor's house (1901) in Renaissance Revival style.
- Rom.-Cath. Church St. Gertrud (1900-1901), three nave Gothic Revival basilica of Wilhelm Sültenfuß.
- Lutheran Schlosskirche (Castle Church) (1905), Renaissance Revival building.
- Kulturbahnhof Eller (Station of Culture), rural/suburban station from 1872, since 1985 place for cultural activities

== Statistics and infrastructure ==
- Foreigners rate: 24.1% (2020)
- Population density: 5,427 inhabitants/km^{2} (2020)
- national highway connection: Cross Düsseldorf-Eller (A46 Wuppertal-Neuss)
- Regional Trains (S-Bahn): 3 lines ( S 1, S 6 and, during the peak hour, S 68)
- Stations: 3 (Eller, Eller Süd, Eller Mitte)
- Tram lines: 1 (705)
- Underground lines: 1 (U75)
- Bus lines: 11 (721, 722, 723, 724, 730, 731, 732, 735, 736, 815, 891)
