= Düsseldorf–Solingen railway =

German railway line

Düsseldorf Hbf–Solingen Hbf

Overview
- Line number: 2676 (D-Eller–Hilden); 2671 (Hilden–Solingen)
- Locale: North Rhine-Westphalia, Germany

Service
- Services: S1, RE47
- Route number: 450.1; 413 (D Hbf–D-Eller)

Technical
- Line length: 19 km (12 mi)
- Track gauge: 1,435 mm (4 ft 8 1/2 in) standard gauge
- Electrification: 15 kV/16.7 Hz AC overhead catenary
- Operating speed: 120 km/h (75 mph)

The Düsseldorf–Solingen railway is a railway in the German state of North Rhine-Westphalia. It is a 19 kilometre line, entirely double track and electrified with overhead line. It is now used by the S 1 of the Rhine-Ruhr S-Bahn and Regional Express service RE47, operated by Regiobahn.

== History ==
The section between Düsseldorf Hauptbahnhof and Düsseldorf-Eller was opened on 1 October 1891 by the Eisenbahndirektionen Cöln rechtsrheinisch (Railway division of Cologne Rhine Right Bank of the Prussian state railways). Between Eller and Hilden the line originally used the Troisdorf–Mülheim-Speldorf line, which was opened by the Rhenish Railway Company on 18 November 1874, but separate tracks were opened in 1917. The section between Hilden and Ohligs (now Solingen Hauptbahnhof) was opened on 3 January 1894.

== Rail services ==
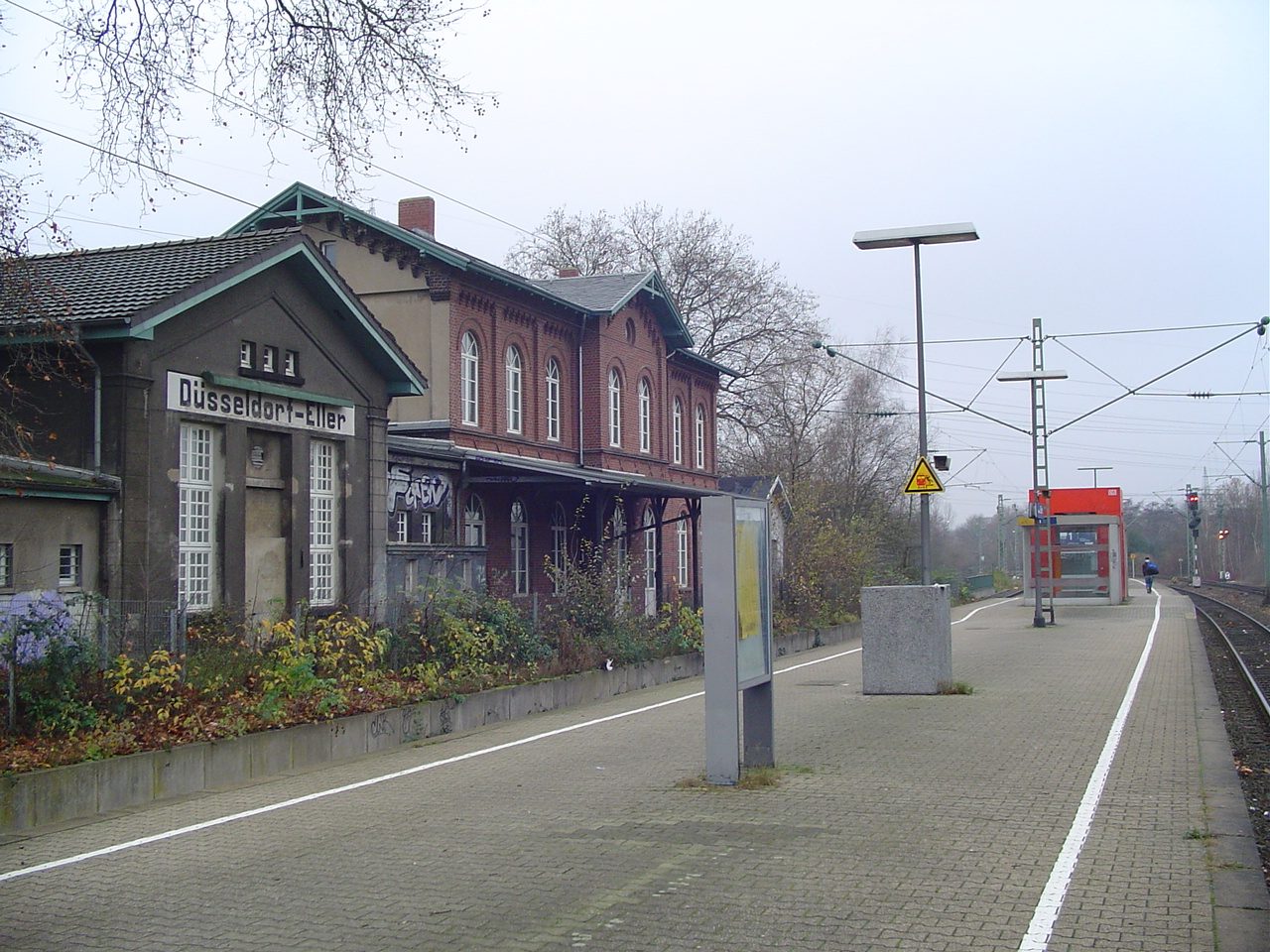
Düsseldorf-Eller station

S-Bahn services started operating over the line to Düsseldorf Airport Terminal on 27 October 1975; these services were eventually branded as S 7. On 13 December 2009, S 7 services were discontinued and operations on the Düsseldorf–Solingen line were taken over by an extension of S 1 from Düsseldorf Hauptbahnhof. These services are operated at 20-minute intervals, using coupled sets of class 422 four-car electrical multiple units.

There are plans to electrify the Wuppertal-Oberbarmen–Solingen railway and to extend the service to Remscheid and Wuppertal.

== Fares ==
The entire line is in the area of the Verkehrsverbund Rhein-Ruhr (Rhine-Ruhr Transport Association), which establishes service levels and sets fares for it.
