= Gerresheim =

City district of Düsseldorf, Germany

Coordinates: 51°14′22″N 6°51′58″E

Map of Düsseldorf, showing Gerresheim (in red) within Borough 7 (in pink)

Gerresheim (German pronunciation: [ˈɡɛʁəshaɪm]) is one of the City of Düsseldorf, Germany's fifty quarters. Part of Borough 7, it is located in the eastern part of the municipality. Gerresheim is much older than Düsseldorf itself, having been an independent city with a rich history for over 1,000 years. Gerresheim merged voluntarily with Düsseldorf in 1909.

Gerresheim has an area of 6.68 km^{2} (2.58 sq mi), and 29,641 inhabitants (2020).

== History ==
In 870, a frankish nobleman named Gerricus founded the church of the women's collegiate foundation (Stift) of St. Margaret's (Gerresheim Abbey).

In 1368, the Count of Berg made the village of Gerresheim surrounding the religious house a city with city rights.

In the 17th century, many of the convent's aristocratic ladies moved away and the city of Gerresheim became increasingly impoverished. Soldiers raided Gerresheim during the Cologne War and later during the Thirty Years' War. The city's reputation suffered in consequence. The Reichsdeputationshauptschluss abolished the abbey in 1803 and the Kingdom of Prussia took over Gerresheim in 1815.

Ferdinand Heye founded the Gerresheimer Glashütte 1864.

== Buildings and attractions ==
- Basilica Saint Margaretha, formerly St. Hippolytus, Roman Catholic church, Romano-Gothic abbey church, was sanctified in 1236 in the place of a church of the Staufens.
- The church's treasures comprise a crucifix from the 10th century and a Gospel book from the 11th century.
- Abbey buildings date from the 13th century.
- Quadenhof Castle dates from the 15th century.
- Gustav Adolf Church, Protestant (Lutheran) church dates from 1878.
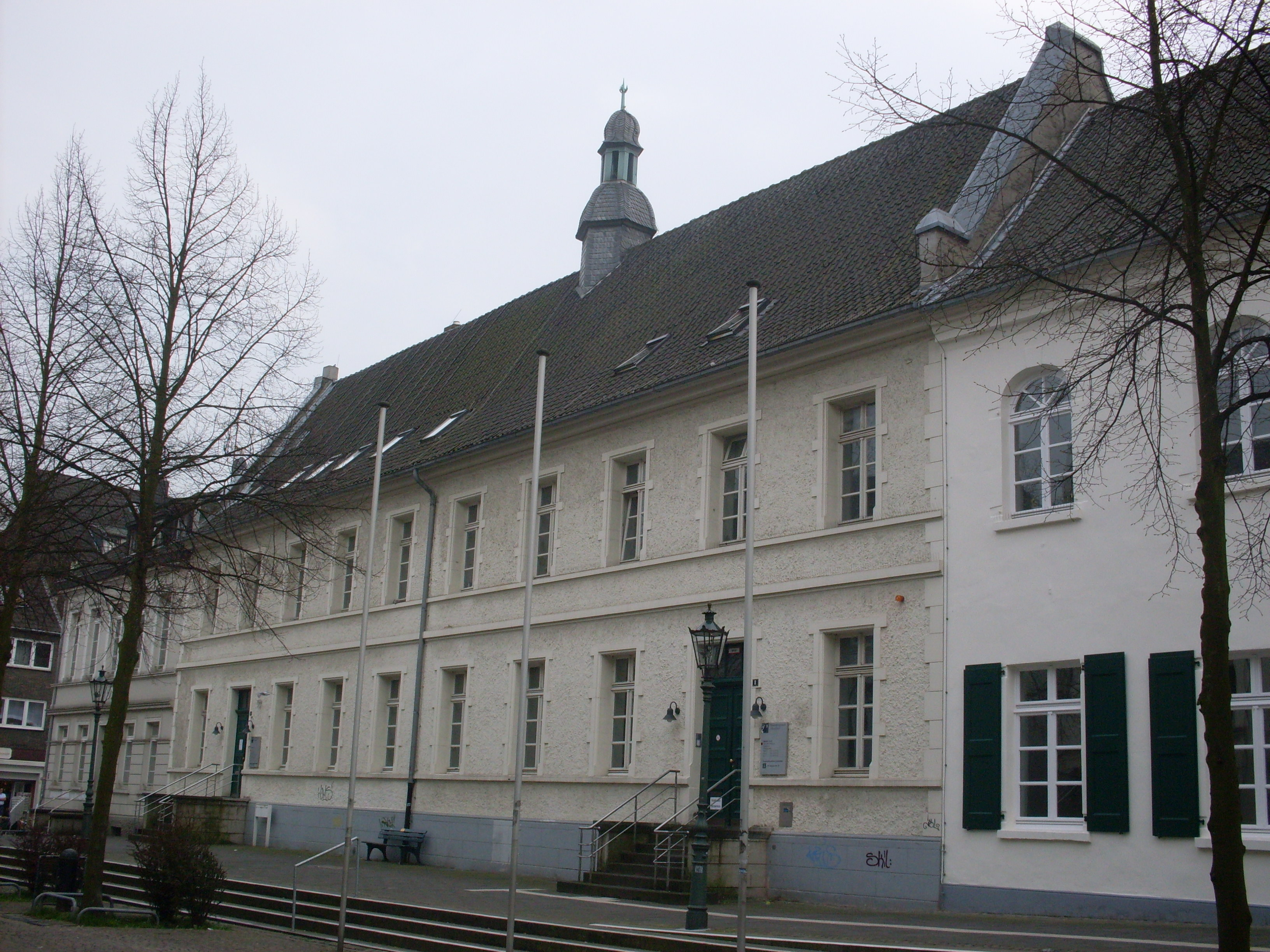
City Hall

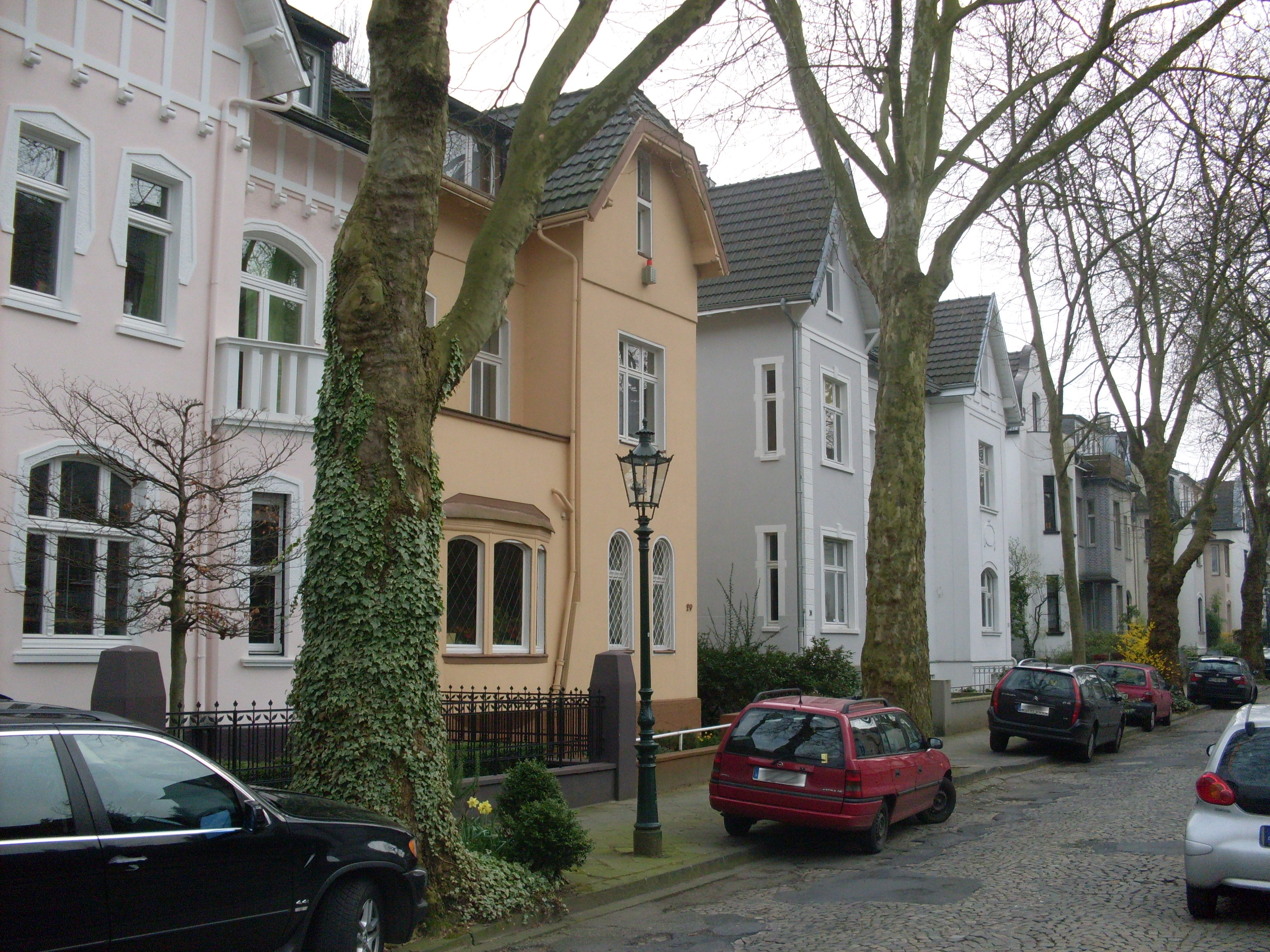
Villas in Gerresheim

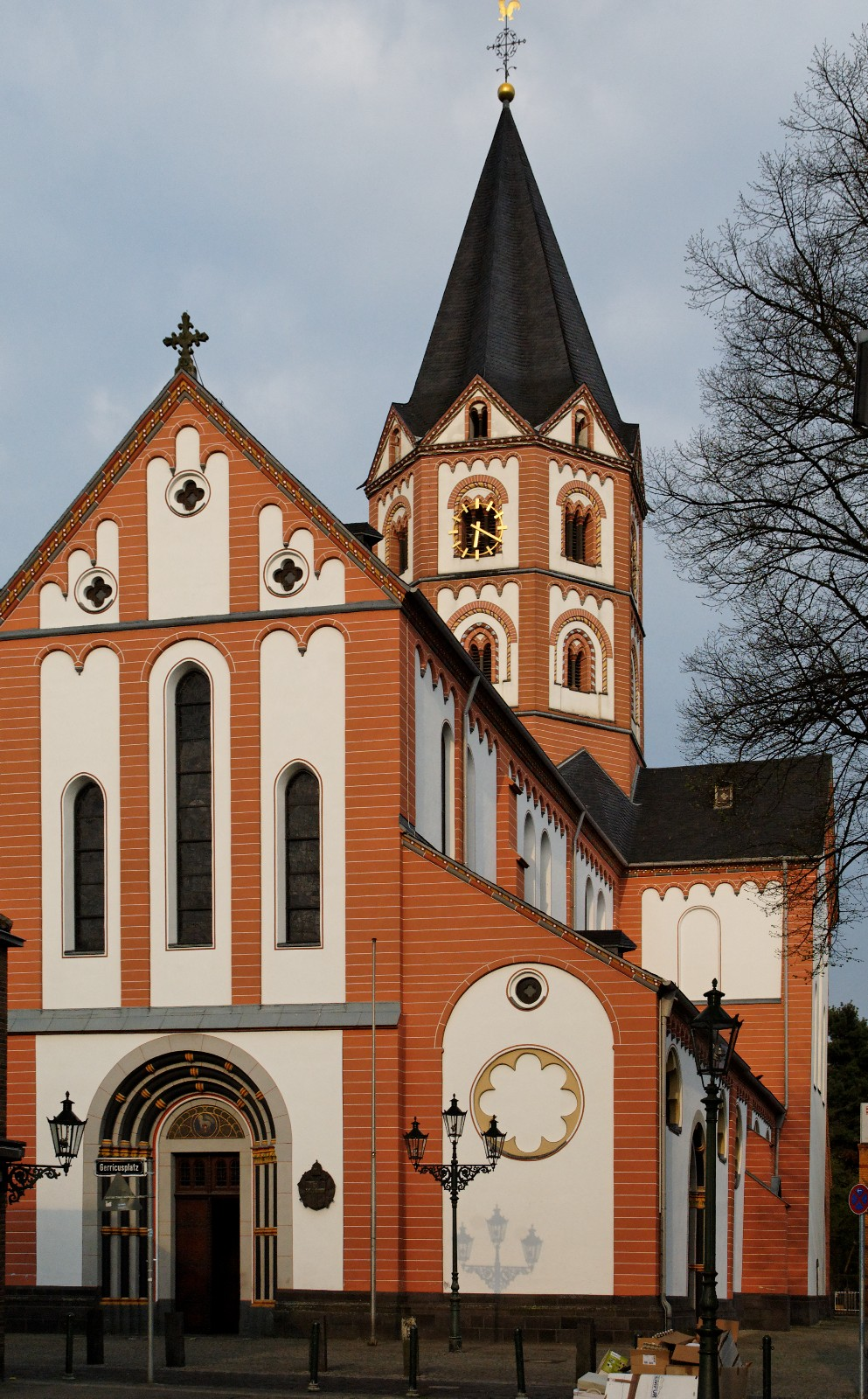
Saint Margaretha, Vaticanic Basilica Minor

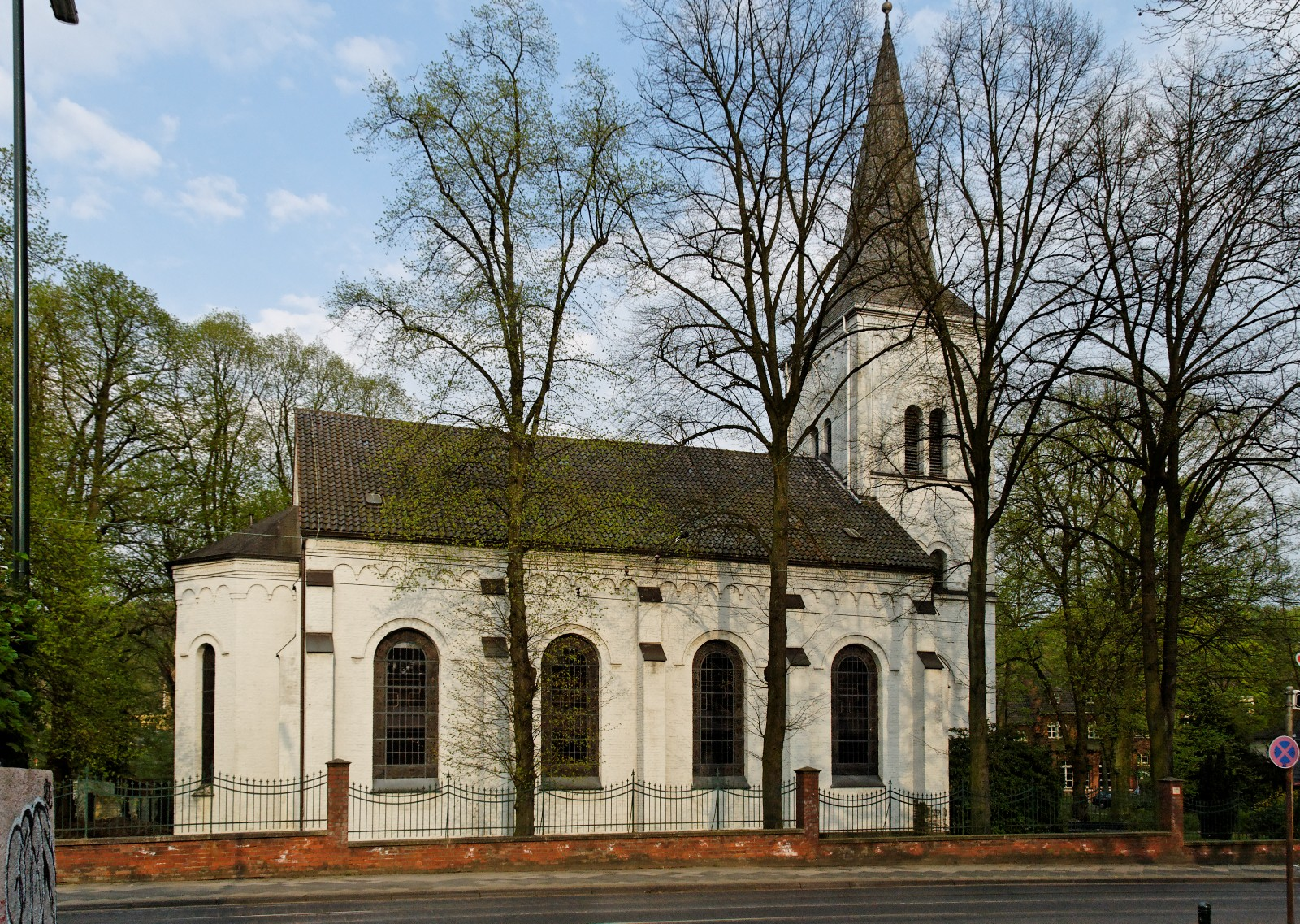
Protestant Gustav Adolf Church

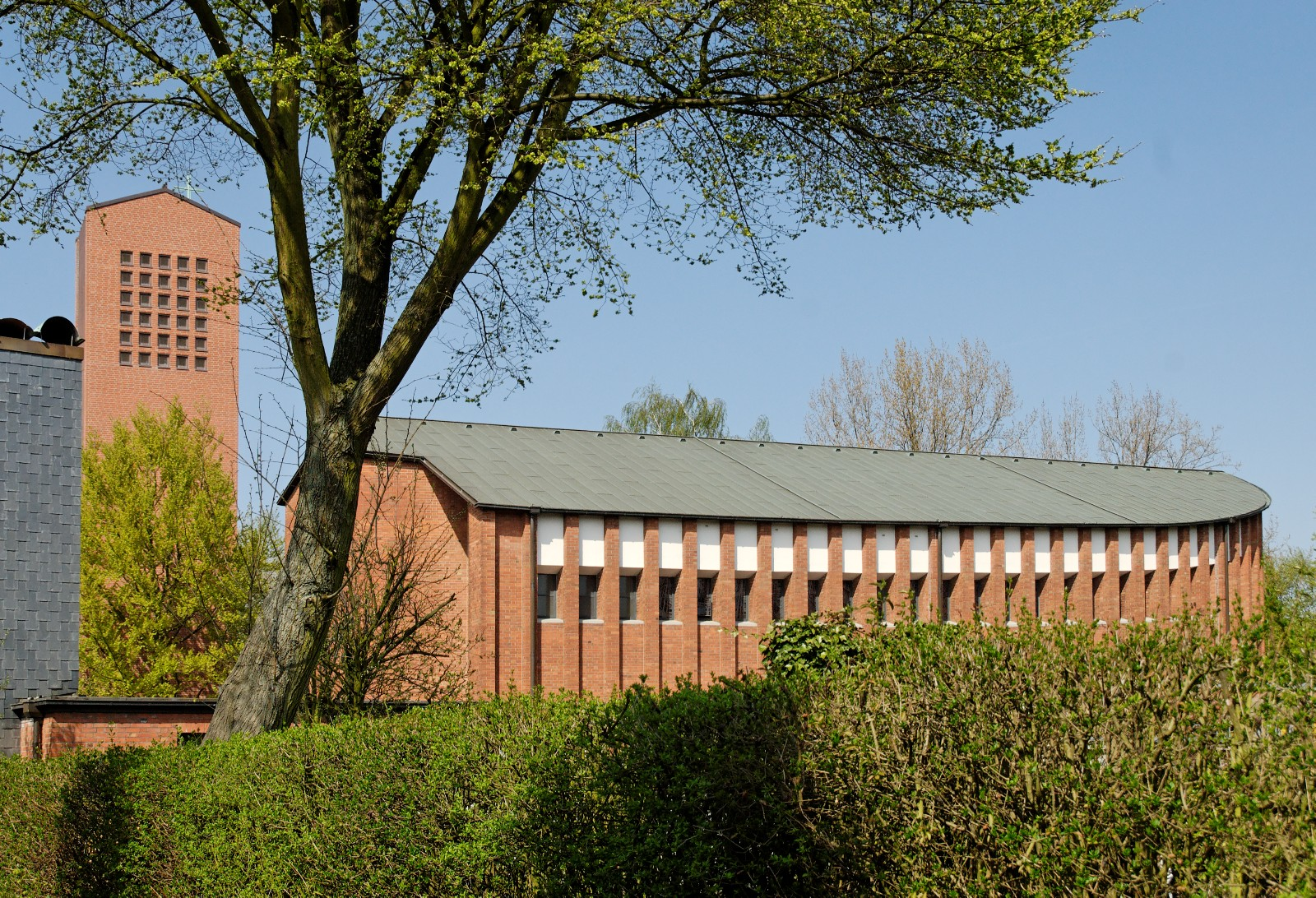
Rom.-Cath. St. Cathrina Church

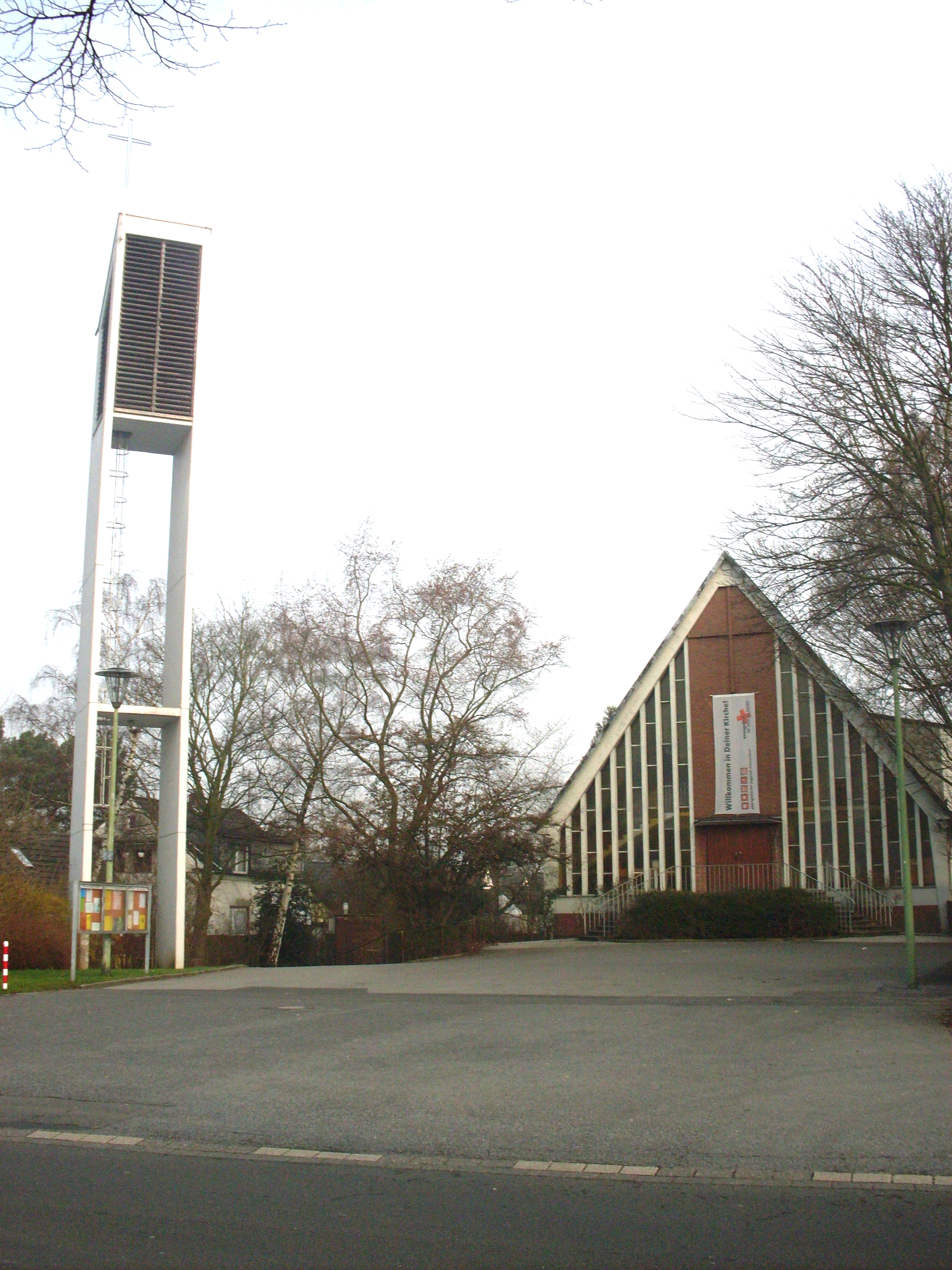
Protestant Mercy Church

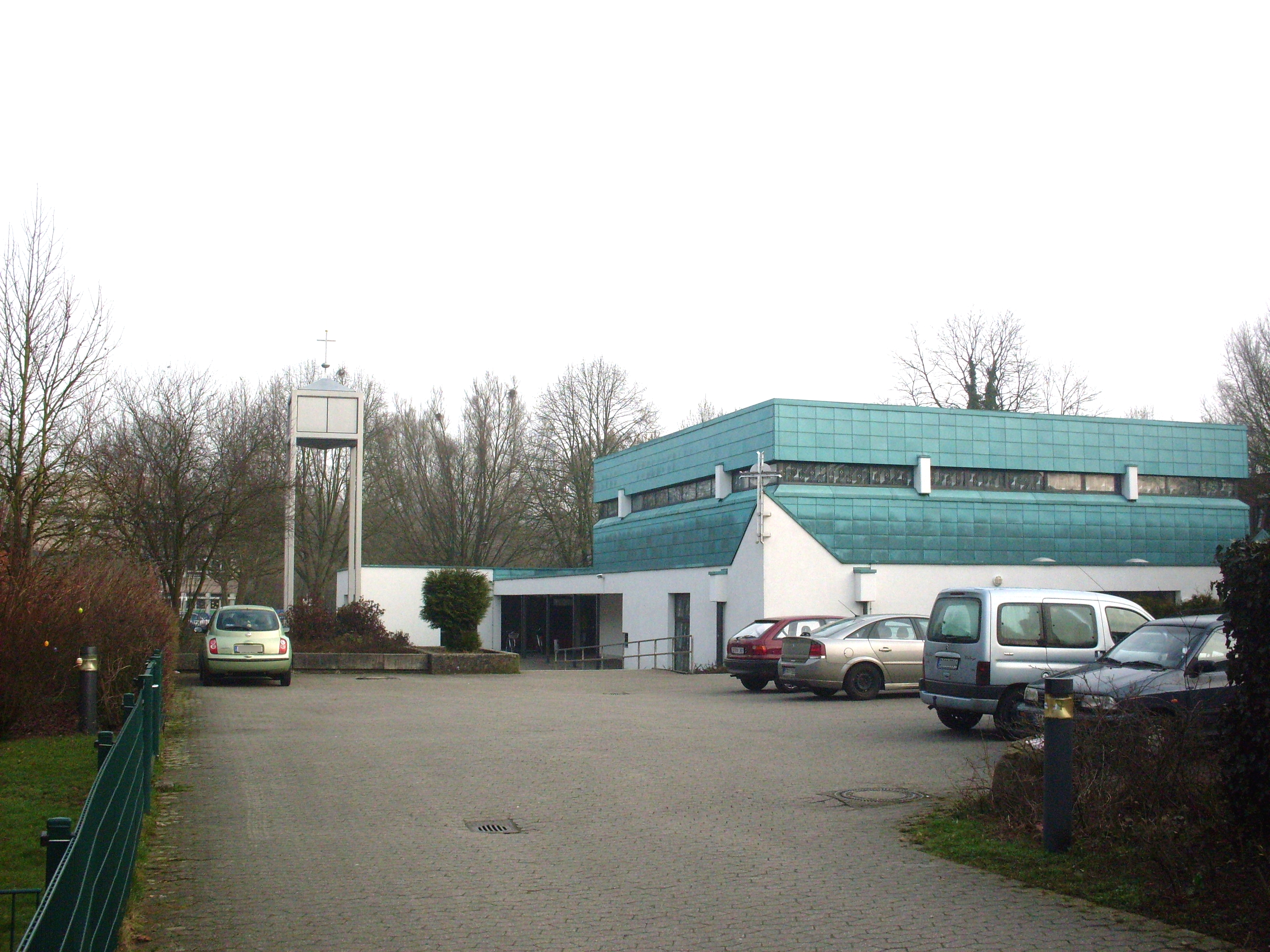
Rom.-Cath. Saint Mary of Peace

Coats of Arms

== Infrastructure ==
Gerresheim has had its own railway station since 1838. Today, three regional train lines stop there: S8, S68, and S28. They connect with Düsseldorf Central Station, Düsseldorf-Bilk, Wuppertal, Neuss, Mönchengladbach, Hagen, Kaarst, and Mettmann. Tram lines 703, 709 and 713 connect Gerresheim with the Düsseldorf's central districts and bus lines with other parts of the city.

== Literary references ==
It is at the Gerresheim Stadtbahn station that the hero of Günter Grass's novel Die Blechtrommel (The Tin Drum) abandons his stolen tram to save Victor Weluhn from execution, as the book draws to an end.
