= Baumberg =

Coordinates: 51°07′03″N 6°53′28″E

Baumberg (also Monheim-Baumberg) is part of the city of Monheim am Rhein in the district of Mettmann in North Rhine-Westphalia (Germany) at the southern border of Düsseldorf, placed on the eastern bank of the river Rhine. Baumberg consists of an area of about 6 km^{2}, with about 14,000 residents in 2023 (one third of the 43,000 in Monheim am Rhein).

== History ==
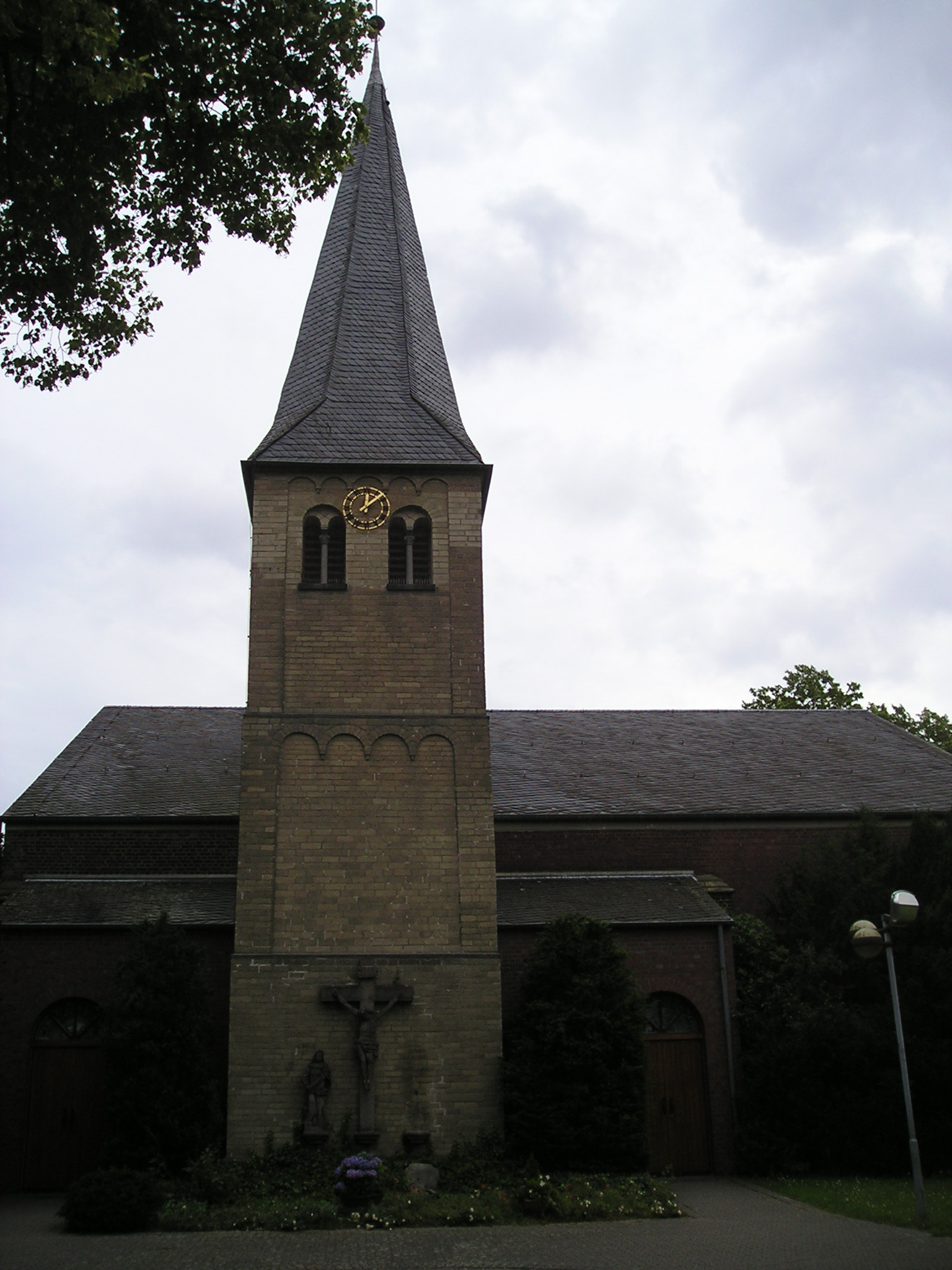
Tower of Catholic church St Dionysius in 2007

Baumberg was first recorded in 1296 as "Boimberg", a village part of the Earldom of Berg. The tower of the Catholic Church St Dionysius which was built in medieval times is left until today whereas the church has been rebuilt according to blueprints of the architect Bernhard Rotterdam in the 1950s. Until the 20th century Baumberg was a rural village, inhabited by mainly fishermen, (goat-)farmers and traditional craftsmen like basket weavers. The eel smokehouse in Baumberg existed from 1857 to 2009 and used fish from its own catch until water pollution in the Rhine became too severe in the 1960s, and then eels from Northern Europe. At the end of the year 1900 about 1,200 people were living in Baumberg and 98 per cent of them were Catholics. The communities of Monheim and Baumberg joined the goat breeding association of the rural district of Solingen in November 1902. The goat, in colloquial German known as "Hippe", was the "little man's cow". The district promoted goat breeding, particularly in the small and poor rural community of Baumberg. A special billy goat station was set up on Schallenstrasse, which existed until 1932. On September 26, 2004, the Boomberger Hippegarde association unveiled a monument on a traffic island at the junction of Schallenstrasse / Im Sträßchen in memory of the former goat breeding station of the Solingen district. The bronze sculpture is industrially manufactured and shows a billy goat standing on its hind legs. In 1908 the Voluntary Fire Department Baumberg was founded. Baumberg belonged to the Prussian Kreis Solingen (English: rural district of Solingen) from the 19th century to 1929. Baumberg belonged to the newly established Kreis Solingen-Lennep in 1929 in which was renamed Rhein-Wupper-Kreis in 1931.

2,000 people lived in Baumberg in 1946 after the end of World War II. In 1951 Baumberg became part of southern neighbouring Monheim in the German state of North Rhine-Westphalia. The Hein Lehmann AG workers' settlement was built between 1952 and 1956. The housing projects by Demag and trade-union-owned building company Neue Heimat boosted population to 5,000 residents in 1965 and to 10,000 in 1969. In 1975, after the municipal reform was carried out, Monheim and Baumberg became districts of Düsseldorf for nearly a year, while the Hitdorf city district of Monheim of became a city district of Leverkusen. On 6 December 1975 the municipal reform resolution against the independence of Monheim and Baumberg was repealed, but Hitdorf remained a district of Leverkusen. The Landtag of North Rhine-Westphalia confirmed this decision by vote on 18 May 1976. On 1 July 1976 Monheim and its city district Baumberg regained their independence and belonged to the district Mettmann (German: Kreis Mettmann). In the eastern part of Baumberg a new quarter with block of flats and terraced houses, the so-called Austrian quarter (German: Österreich-Viertel), was created from the late 1970s to the 1990s.

In 1985, the allotment garden Im Baumberger Feld was created on the border with Düsseldorf-Hellerhof, which has 98 plots.

In 2002, the Knipprather Busch allotment garden association, which was established in 1972, moved to Loheck in Baumberg, because the original location on the former Henkel landfill was to be renovated.

Nowadays Baumberg is mainly a suburban residential area with many commuters to the surrounding towns.

== Population ==
Around a third of Monheim's approximately 43,000 residents, over 14,000 residents, lived in the Baumberg district in 2023.

=== Development of the population ===
- 1900: 1,200
- 1946: 2,000
- 1965: 5,000
- 1969: 10,000
- 2023: >14,000

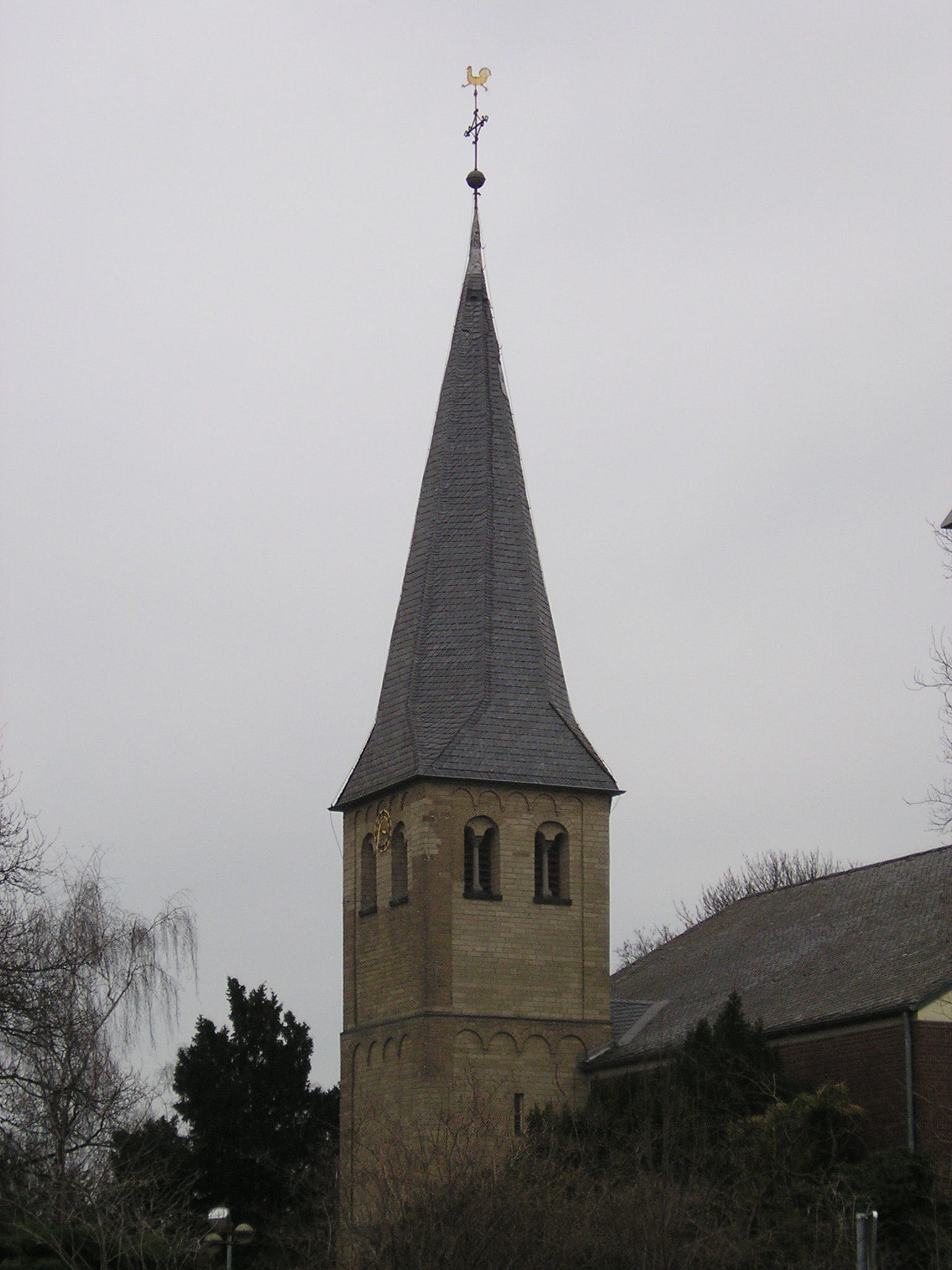
St. Dionysus church Baumberg (2007)

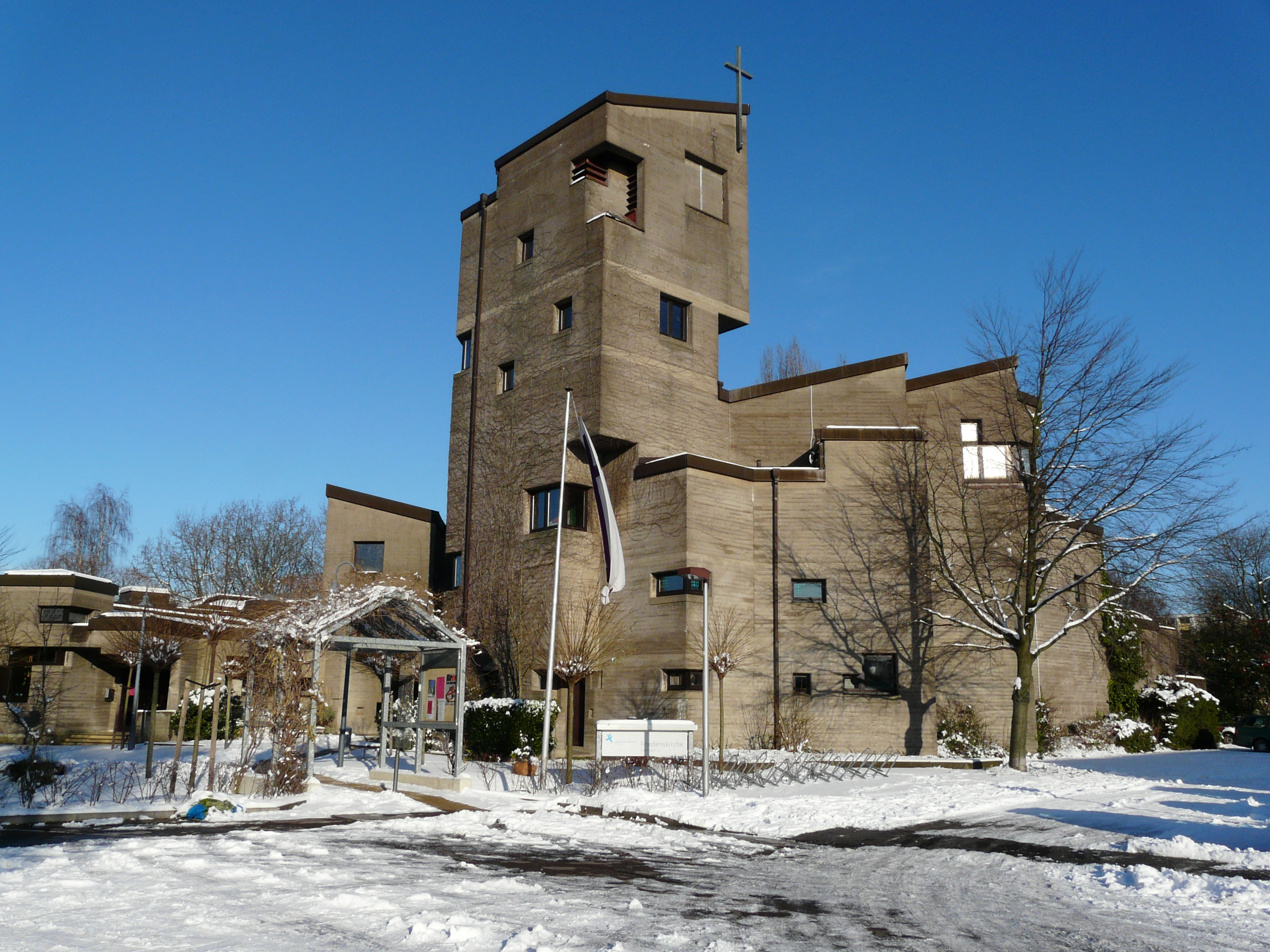
Friedenskirche Baumberg (2009)

=== Religions ===
==== Catholic community ====
The Catholic community was first mentioned in 1296 and gained independence in 1890 as an independent parish with 1,800 believers, the number of which grew to around 7,000 by 2011. On January 1, 2011, the Baumberg parish of St. Dionysius was merged with the Monheim parish of St. Gereon, which had around 9,000 believers at the time, to form the parish of St. Gereon and Dionysius Monheim a.Rh in the Archdiocese of Cologne.

==== Evangelical community ====
From 1967 to 1975, the Baumberg Protestant Church Friedenskirche was built, which was made necessary by the large influx of people. In 2020, the Protestant parish in Baumberg had 3,559 members. It belongs to the Evangelical Church of Monheim (9,718 parishioners in 2020), which includes the urban area of Monheim am Rhein and the Hitdorf district of Leverkusen, i.e. the Monheim urban area before the municipal reform in North Rhine-Westphalia in 1975.

==== Other Christian communities and special communities that emerged from Christianity ====
In Baumberg there is also the Evangelistic Church Christliche Versammmlung (English: Christian Assembly), in which Darwin's theory of evolution is not recognized as scientific, but creationism is advocated.

== Infrastructure ==
=== Traffic routes ===
Baumberg can be reached via five streets. Two come from Monheim am Rhein to the south, Monheimer Straße and Baumberger Chaussee, one, Urdenbacher Weg (Landesstraße 293), connects via Urdenbacher Kämpe to Düsseldorf-Urdenbach to the north; one, the Garather Weg (Kommunalstraße 13), to the west with Düsseldorf-Hellerhof and one, the Berghausener Straße (Landesstraße 353), to the west with Langenfeld, Rhineland. This road provides a connection to connection no. 24 (Richrath / Baumberg) of the A59. The closest option for crossing the Rhine is the car ferry from Düsseldorf-Urdenbach to Dormagen-Zons in the district Rhein-Kreis Neuss. Since summer 2012, a ferry from Monheim am Rhein to Dormagen-Piwipp has crossed the Rhine on weekends and public holidays. The ferry service of the so-called "Piwipper Böötchen" takes place from April 7 to October 15 in 2023.

=== Local public transport ===
==== Bus ====
In local public transport, a number of bus lines run through Baumberg: the lines 777, SB78, 788 und 789. The bus lines are operated by the municipality of Monheim. The Düsseldorf-Hellerhof, Düsseldorf-Benrath and Düsseldorf-Reisholz stops on the S-Bahn line S 6 (Cologne – Düsseldorf – Essen) are located in the neighboring city of Düsseldorf and can be reached by bus line 789. Bus number 788 also goes to the stop in Benrath. Langenfeld-Berghausen train station has been connected via line 777 since 1980 and via express bus line SB78 since 2017. The VRR tariff applies without exception to the bus routes running through Baumberg. The Monheim ticket allows free use of public transport in Baumberg, Monheim am Rhein and Langenfeld (VRR tariff area 73) and also to the Düsseldorf-Hellerhof station since 1 April 2020. However, the city of Monheim and its transport company, the railways of the city of Monheim, belong to both Verkehrsverbund Rhein-Ruhr (VRR) and Verkehrsverbund Rhein-Sieg (VRS). The VRS tariff is only applied when traveling to other cities in the VRS tariff area (e.g. Leverkusen).

==== Tram ====
In 1908 the first tram ran between Monheim and Langenfeld train station and quickly became the most important means of transport. As a result of motorization after the Second World War, the number of passengers fell drastically; The last tram with the final stop on the Hauptstraße (main street) below the Church of St. Dionysius ran on 15 June 1963.

=== Public facilities ===
==== Citizens' Office ====
The citizens' office, which opened once a week at Holzweg 95 from April 18, 2000, was not well received. It was closed on November 9, 2005, as a result of the austerity package passed by the council. From 1 April 2015 all citizen concerns could be addressed at the Monheim Citizens' Office on Wednesdays from 9 a.m. to 12 p.m. It was located in the premises of the Raiffeisenbank which also was given up after a short time due to lack of demand.

The citizens' office in Monheim is available on six days and 57 hours of the week except for Sundays and public holidays.

==== Moki Café ====
Families with children under 3 years of age can meet in the Moki Café in the Baumberg shopping center from Monday to Friday from 9 a.m. to 12 a.m.

==== Fire department ====
The Baumberg Volunteer Fire Department, founded in 1908, is now part of the volunteer fire department of the city of Monheim am Rhein and is run as fire engine II Baumberg. The fire engine has been housed in the fire station at the intersection of Kreuzstraße and Thomasstraße since 1982. A new fire station has been under construction since October 2023, which will cost 9 million euros and shall be completed in September 2025.

==== Sports facility ====
In 1981 the district sports facility was set up in the Österreichviertel. It was reopened because of the creation of the new Waldebeerenweg residential area and relocated towards Berghausener Straße. The construction of the sports field, which was approved in July 2018, cost 1.89 million euros. The costs for an associated sports hall, which was completed at the end of May 2018, amounted to 2.16 million euros.

==== Medical care ====
There are four joint practices for general medicine, three dentists and an ophthalmologist in Baumberg. Until August 31, 2013, there was the St. Josef Hospital in Monheim am Rhein, which was closed due to high losses (8.5 million euros from 2008 to 2013) and demolished in 2017. The health campus, which was completed in 2022, was built there. Currently, the nearest hospitals are in Langenfeld-Richrath (St. Martinus Hospital of the GFO Association) and Düsseldorf-Benrath (Sana Hospital).

=== Economy ===
The shops are mainly located in the Holzweg shopping center, which was built in 1969 and was rebranded "Holzweg-Passage" in 2020 after renovation. Renovation was continued until 2021. The shops are not very specialized, mainly selling consumer goods and everyday items such as food, flowers and stationery and there is a kiosk with a post office.

Businesses consider the small number of parking spaces to be problematic, particularly on the Hauptstraße. A beautification of the Hauptstraße using city funds was carried out from mid-February 2016 and finished in June 2017. The Foundry, located on Berghausener Straße/Heinrich-Hertz-Straße and operated by Schmolz + Bickenbach, was closed in 2009. After the demolition, an Edeka market with a bakery, which opened in April 2014, and a residential complex had been built on the site since May 2013.

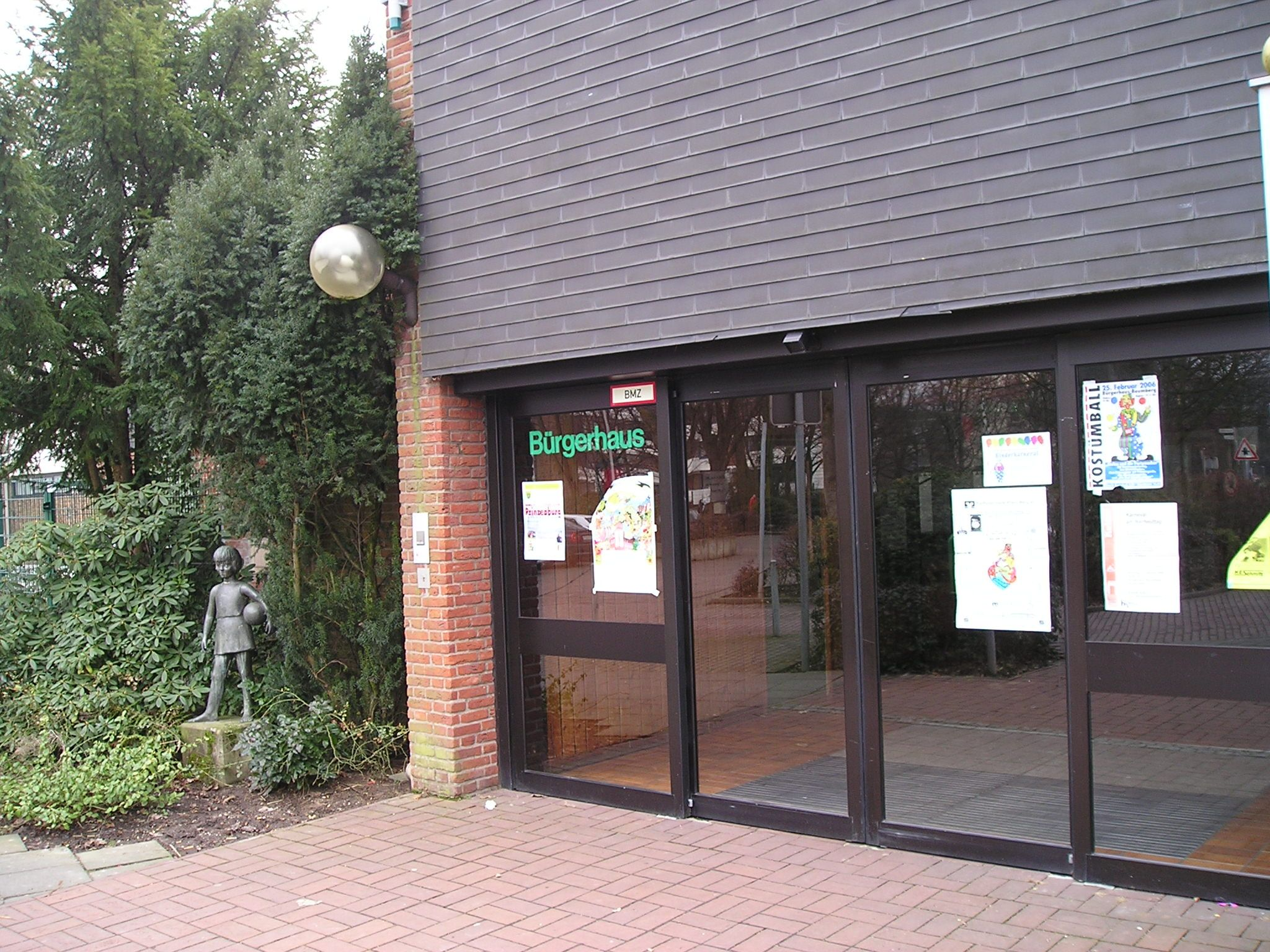
Citizens' meeting house Bürgerhaus Baumberg (2006)

== Places of Interest ==
- Friedenskirche – The Friedenskirche (Peace Church) is a Protestant church in Monheim-Baumberg, built from 1968 to 1974 according to the plans of Walter Maria Foerderer and an outstanding example of Brutalism in the Rhineland.
- Bürgerhaus – The citizens' meeting house was opened on 1 October 1982. It is used for events by associations and can be rented by the citizens for celebrations, too.

== Clubs ==
Baumberg has a large number of clubs. The best-known club is the football club Sportfreunde Baumberg e. V. which plays in the (Oberliga Niederrhein) and secured participation in the DFB Cup in 2013 by winning the final in the Lower Rhine Cup in 2013. There are also the St. Sebastianus-Schützenbruderschaft Baumberg 1900 e. V., a marksmen's club. as well as the Baumberger Allgemeine Bürgerverein e. V., which was founded in 1961 and has over 400 members, and the carnival club 1. Baumberger Hippegarde 1998.

== Regular events ==
- Veedelszoch (Ripuarian language for carnival parade through the quarter of the city), every year on the day before Rosenmontag (English: Rose-Monday), which has been executed since 1992.
- summer festival of the voluntary fire department of Baumberg, one Week after Pentecost, which has been executed since 1986.
- Sonnenwendfest (English: Solstitial feast) at the citizen's meadows (German: Bürgerwiese), on the Saturday after the 21 June or on 21 June, which has been executed since 1979.
- Sängerfest (English: "singers' festival", 2008–2017), in September. From 2008 to 2013 it was executed as an open air event, from 2014 to 2017 it was executed as an indoor event in Bürgerhaus Baumberg.
- Sängerkirmes (English: singers' fair) (1978–2007), in September
- St. Martin's Day parade (German: Martinszug) for all children under 14 years of age with the final distribution of the Martin's bag, financed by donations, annually on November 11. Executed by Martins-Komitee Baumberg 1909 e. V.
- St. Nicholas market (German: Nikolausmarkt) in December, which has been executed since 1998. It has been organized by the FBA (Freundeskreis Baumberger Alstadtviertel) since 2004.
