= Daniel Zimmermann =

German politician (born 1982)

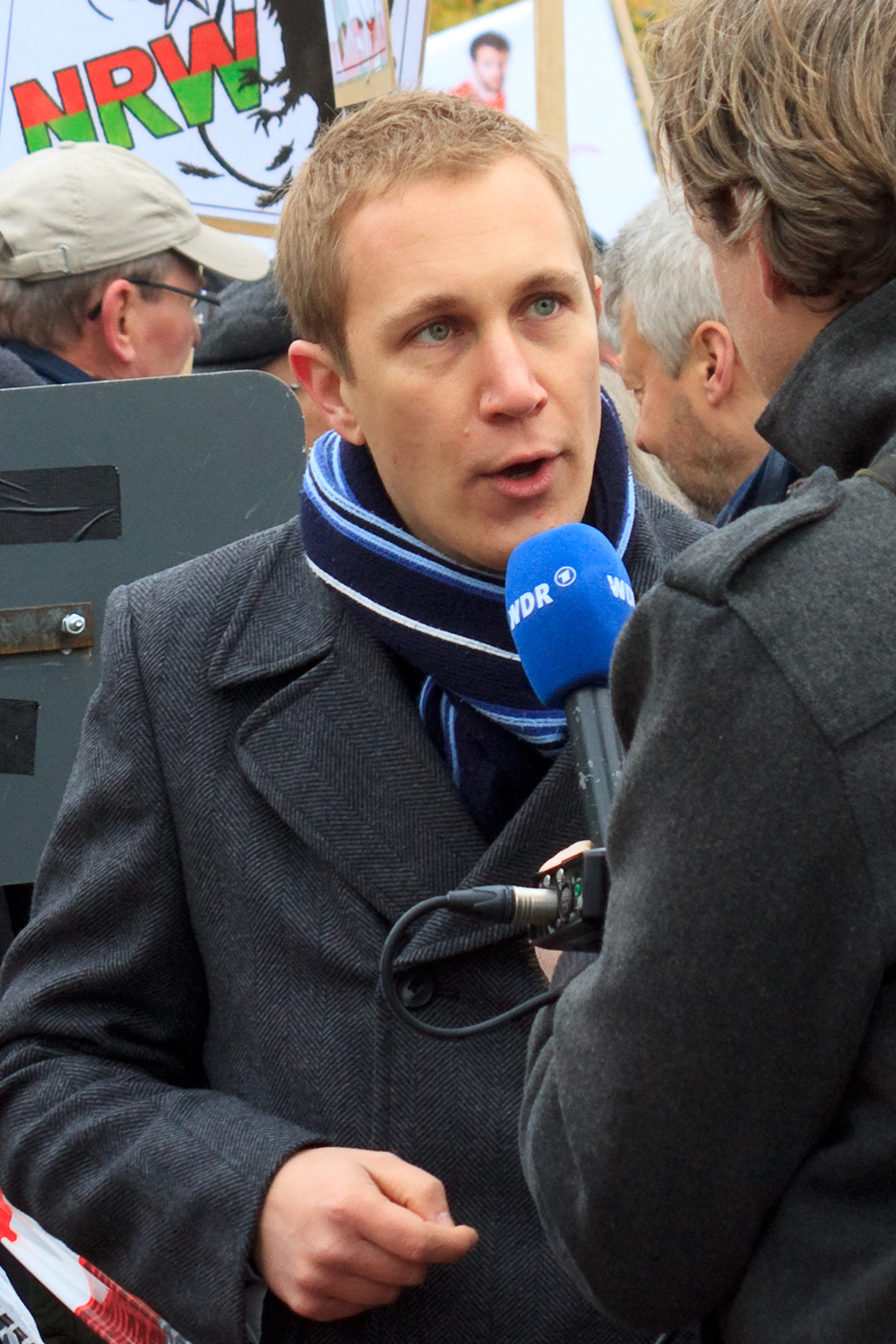
Daniel Zimmermann, 2013

Daniel Zimmermann (born 3 May 1982 in Düsseldorf) is a German politician, founder of the PETO party, and he was the mayor of Monheim am Rhein from 2009 until 2025. When elected, he was the youngest mayor in Germany.

== Professional career ==
Zimmermann grew up as the son of a printing press technician and an administration clerk in Baumberg. From 1988 to 1992 he attended the Geschwister-Scholl-Grundschule (elementary school) in Baumberg. Then he advanced to the Otto-Hahn-Gymnasium in Monheim, where he achieved Abitur in 2001. Afterwards he underwent civil service at the Biologische Station Urdenbacher Kämpe e.V.. From 2002 to 2008 he studied French and Physics at the University of Cologne to become a teacher. In December 2008 he achieved the first Staatsexamen. At last he worked as a scientist at the Romanisches Seminar (seminar for Romance languages) at the university. He was a tutor for the intermediate examination at the language-related sector of the subjects French, Italian, Spanish and Portuguese and prepared his PhD-thesis.

== Political career ==
In 1999, Zimmermann and four other teenagers founded the youth party PETO – Die junge Alternative (PETO - the young alternative). The name of the party refers to the Latin word peto (in English: „I postulate“). Zimmermann became first president of this new party until 2004. The party could rise its results continually. In 1999 they achieved 6 per cent and three seat in the city council and 2004 they improved this result with 16,6% and seven seats. In 2004 he belonged to the city council, too. Five years earlier, he had not been allowed to run for office, because he was not yet 18 years old. He was president of the city council group of PETO until 2006. He has been president of the board which controls for the town-owned companies since 2005. During the Monheim am Rhein city Council election PETO achieved 29,56% of the votes and twelve seats in the city council, only 108 votes less than the biggest party CDU which gained twelve seats, too. During the mayor election which took place simultaneously, for which he was nominated as a candidate by his party in August 2008, Zimmermann gained 30,35% of the votes, which meant a relative majority, enough to win, after the two-round system had been abolished in 2007. He was re-elected in 2014 with 94.64% and in 2020 with 68.46%, leaving office in 2025 upon completion of his third term.

== Works ==
- „Ich kann Bürgermeister!“: Mit 27 Jahren Deutschland jüngstes Stadtoberhaupt. Fackelträger-Verlag, Köln, ISBN 978-3-7716-4460-4.
