= Düsseldorf-Garath =

City district of Düsseldorf, Germany

Coordinates: 51°08′48″N 6°53′41″E

Map of Düsseldorf, showing Garath (in red) within Borough 10 (in pink)

Garath (German pronunciation: [ˈga:ʁaːt]) is a suburb of Düsseldorf, Germany, south of the city centre and part of Borough 10. It has an area of 3.26 km^{2} (1.26 sq mi), and 19,048 inhabitants (2020).

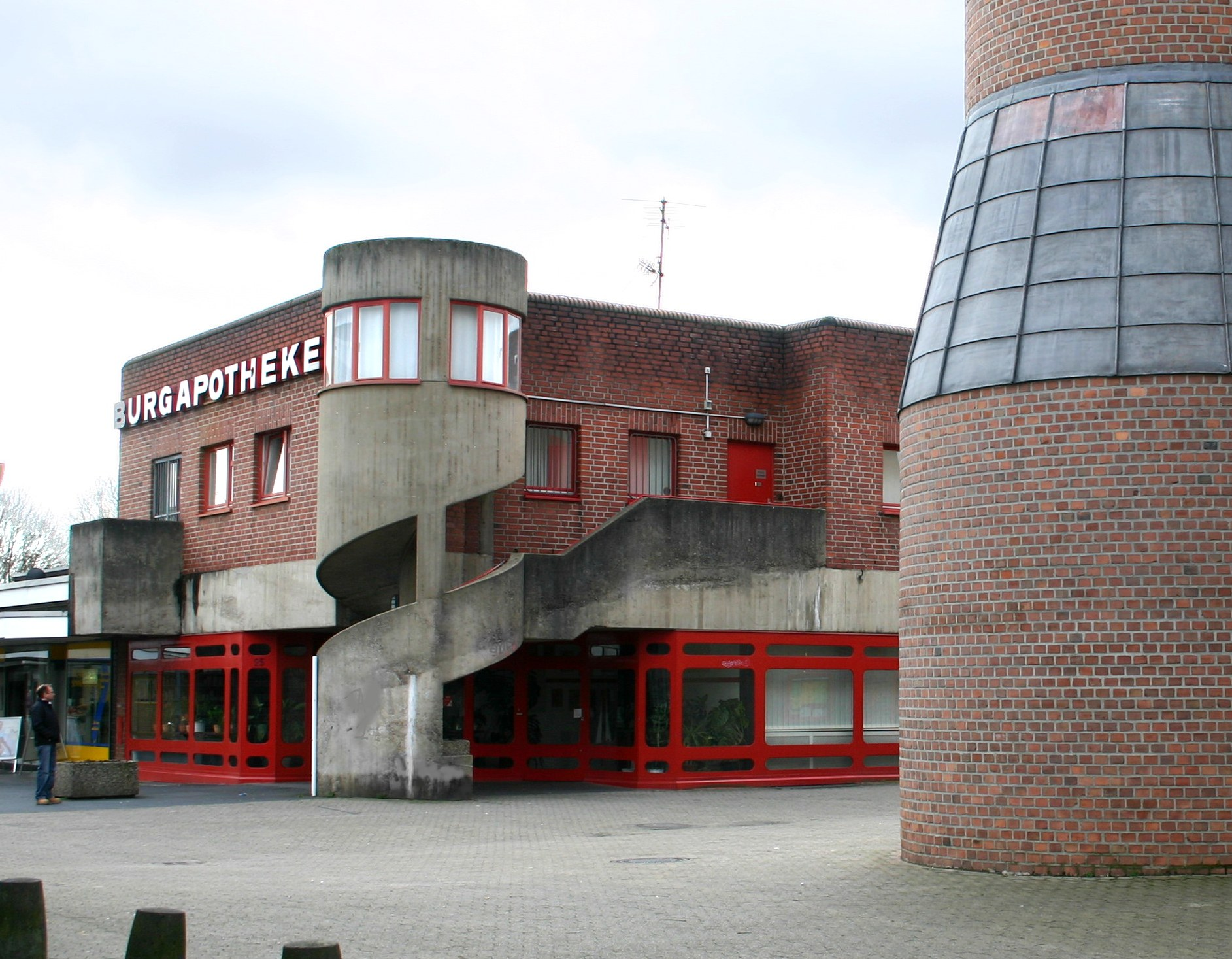
1960s buildings in Garath, designed by Gottfried Böhm.

== Geography ==
Garath adjoins the Düsseldorf suburbs of Urdenbach to the north-west, Benrath to the north and Hellerhof to the south. To the east lies Hilden a town in Mettmann district and to the southwest is Monheim am Rhein, part of Langenfeld.

== History ==
Garath is named after Schloss Garath, a manor house that traces its history back to the 9th century. The oldest known record of Garath's existence is in a contract from 1271 witnessed by Bruno von Ganderode, the lord of Garath. For several centuries, Garath consisted of little beyond the manor house and associated buildings.

On 23 May 1929, Garath became a part of Benrath. On 31 July 1929 Benrath, including Garath, was declared part of Düsseldorf.

In the mid-1950s, the Düsseldorf local authority initiated a building programme to provide 8,000 homes south of Benrath. The first residents moved into finished flats in 1963.

Several high-rise blocks of flats were built in Garath in the 1970s as low-cost accommodation. This has led to southern parts of Garath having a higher than average proportion of lower income, immigrant and unemployed residents.

== Infrastructure ==
Garath has a direct connection to the autobahns A 59 and A 46. It has its own S-Bahn station. A highway connects Garath to central Düsseldorf.

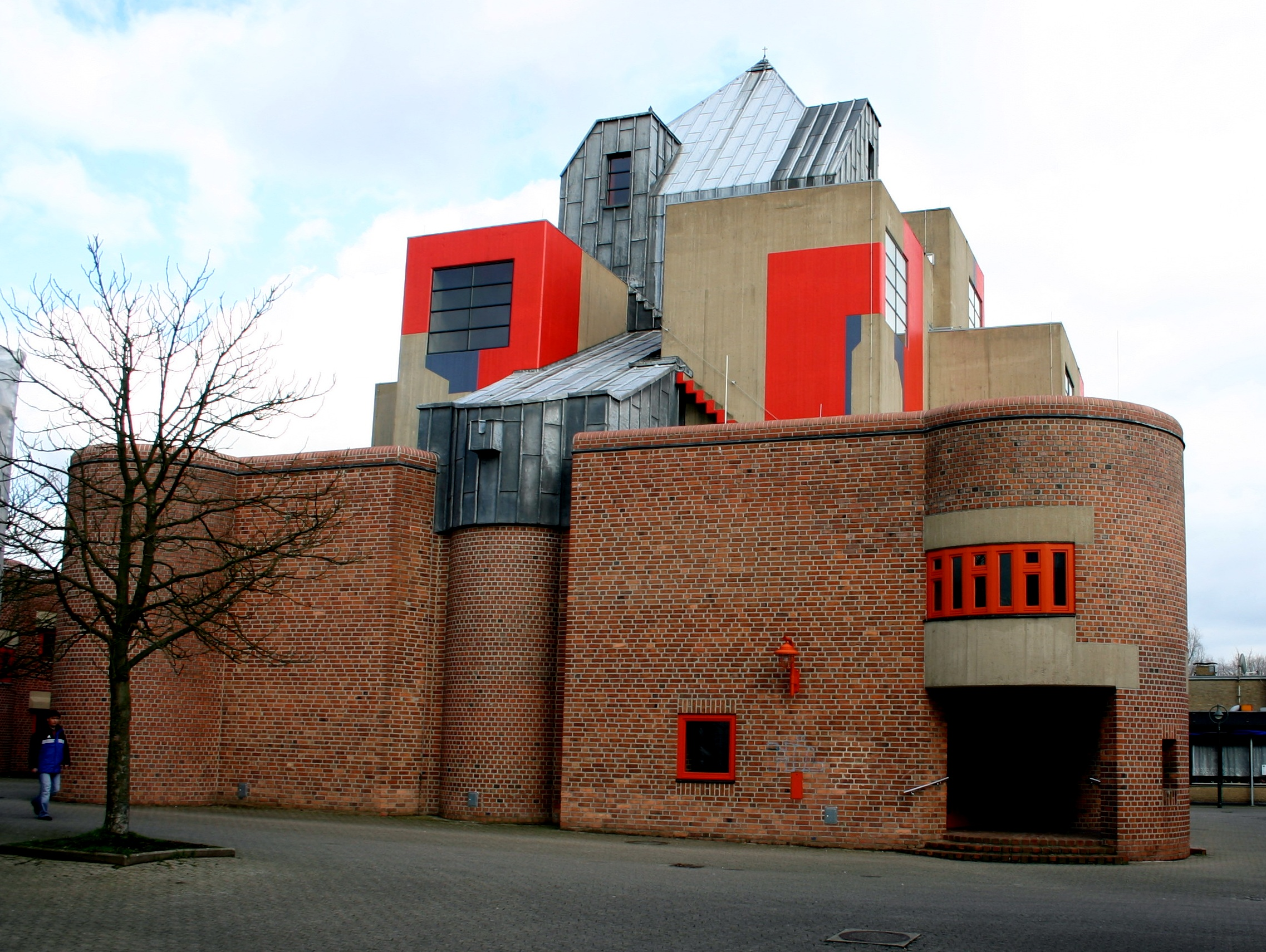
St Matthai

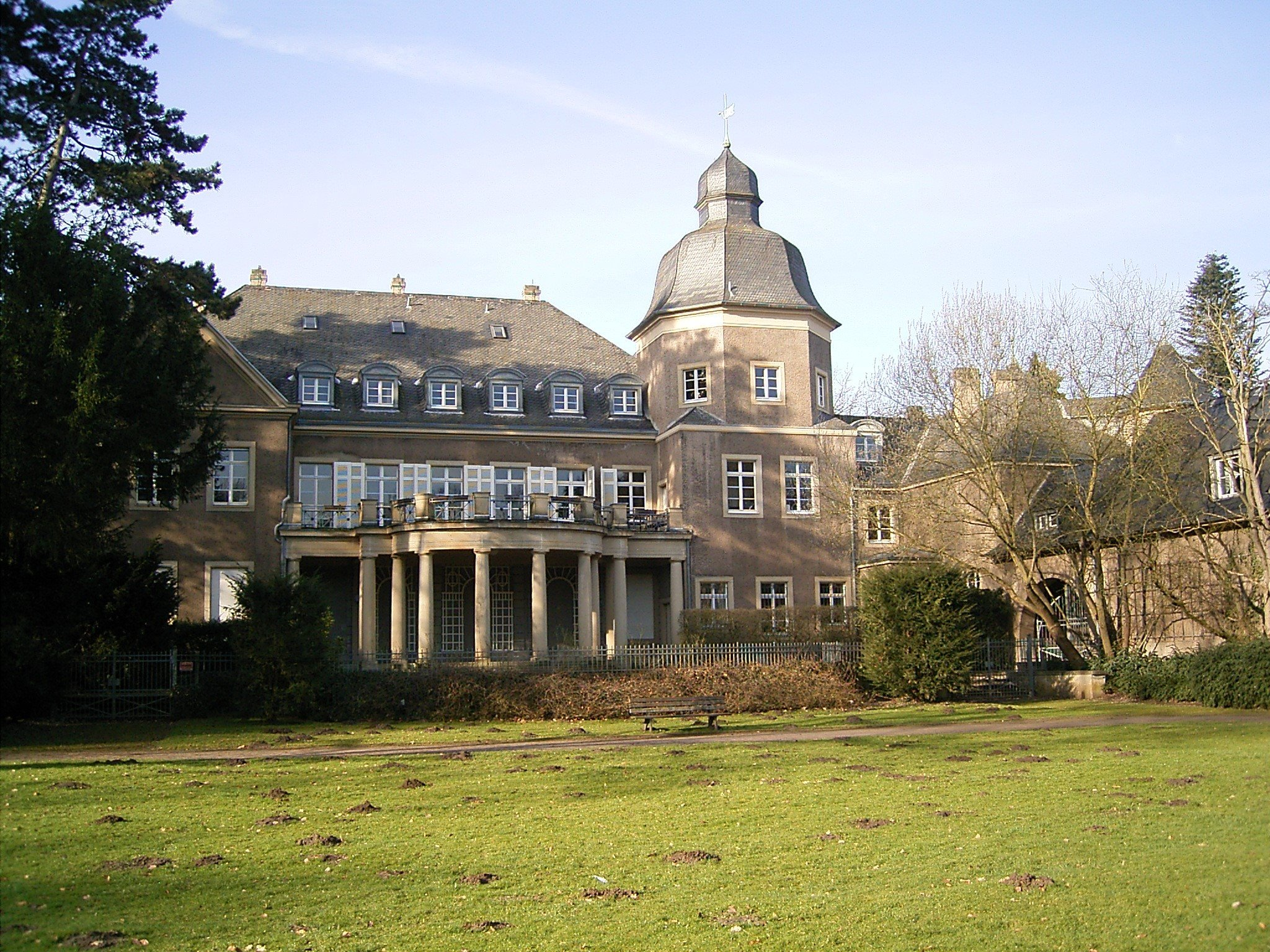
Schloss Garath

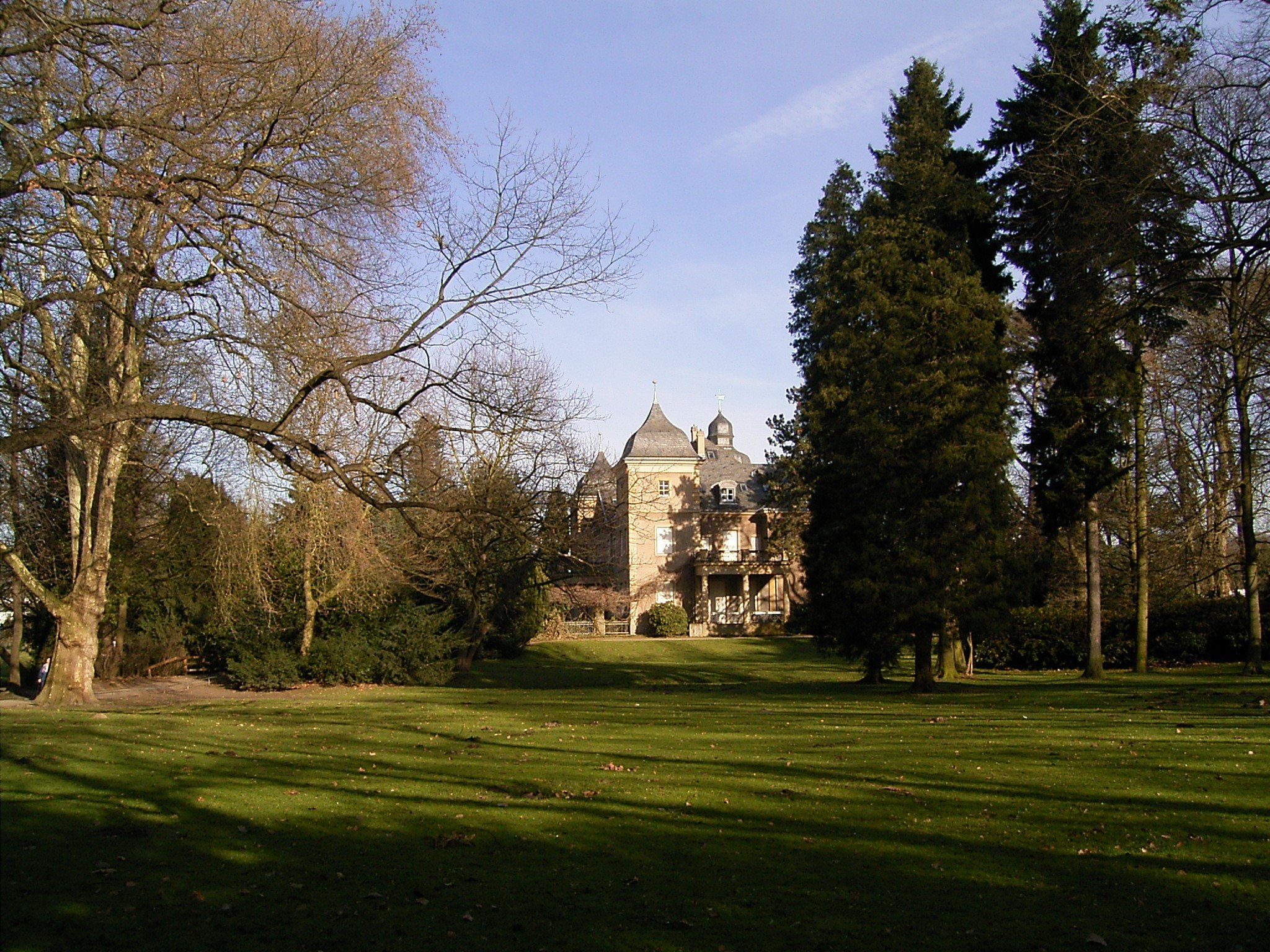

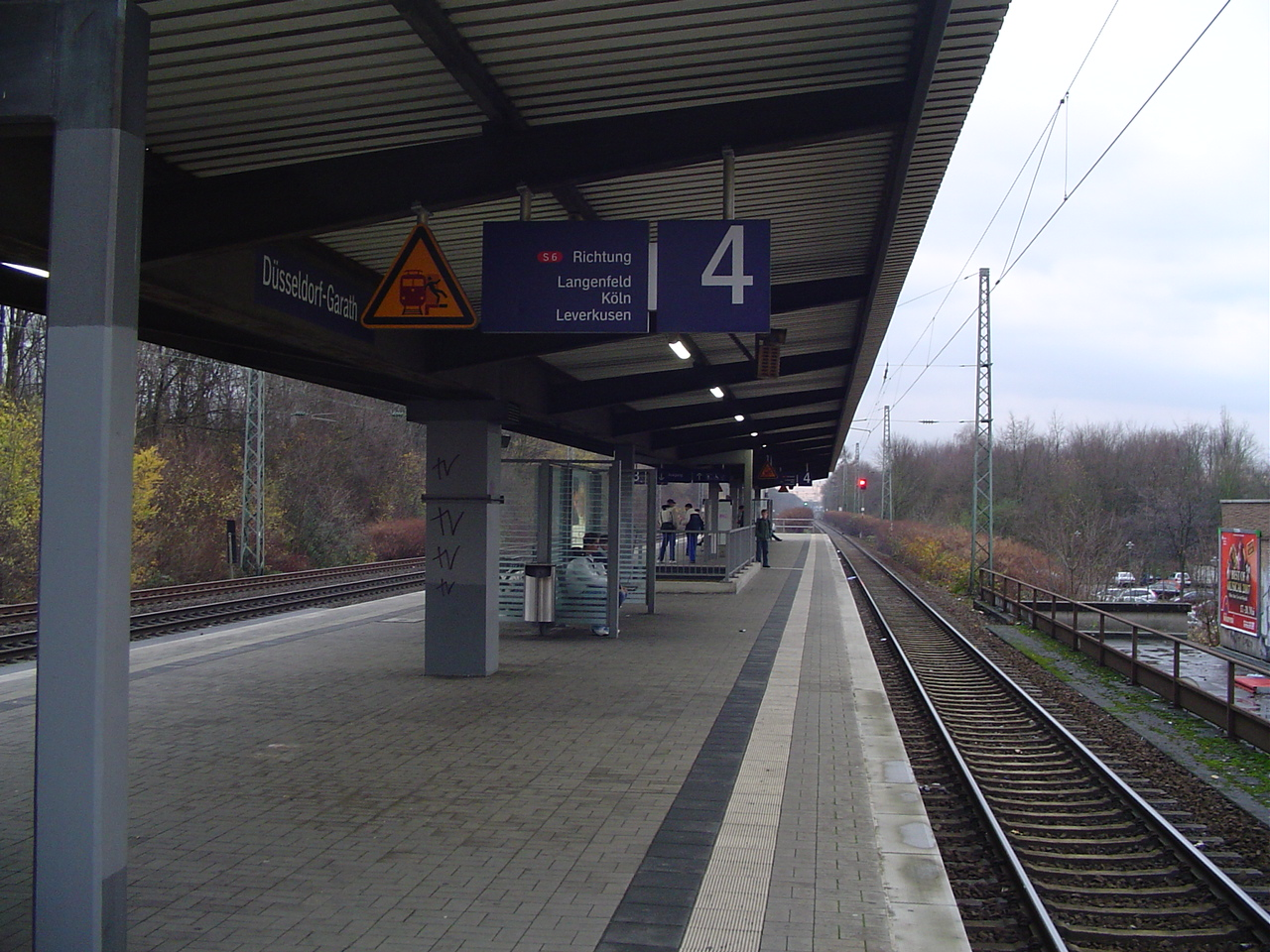
Düsseldorf-Garath station
