= Claude Pujade-Renaud =

French writer (1932–2024)

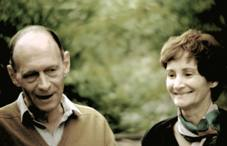
Pujade-Renaud (right) with Daniel Zimmermann

Claude Pujade-Renaud (25 February 1932 – 18 May 2024) was a French writer, whose first novel Le Ventriloque appeared in 1978. She subsequently published over twenty novels, short-story and poetry collections, as well as combined creative works with long-time partner Daniel Zimmermann. She won the prix Goncourt des lycéens in 1994 for Belle mère, her novel on being a stepmother, and was a recipient of the French Writer's Guild Prize for her life's work.

A dance teacher, she taught Body Expression courses at the University of Paris-VIII, and was the author of a number of pedagogical texts relating to the body and the class-room.

Childlessness and sexuality were recurring themes in her novels, which have veered towards the historical in the latter part of her career.

Pujade-Renaud died on 18 May 2024, at the age of 92.

== Works ==
Novels

- 1988: La Danse océane, Fabert; Actes Sud Babel 1996
- 1992: Martha ou le Mensonge du mouvement, Manya; Actes Sud Babel 1996
- 1994: Belle mère, Actes Sud Babel; J'ai Lu 1997
- 1996: La Nuit la neige, Actes Sud; Actes Sud Babel 1998; J'ai Lu 1998
- 1997: Le Sas de l'absence, Actes Sud, prix de lécrit intime; Actes Sud Babel 2000 (publié avec La Ventriloque)
- 1998: A Corps et A Raison
- 1999: Platon était malade, Actes Sud
- 2004: Le Jardin forteresse, Actes Sud
- 2006: Chers Disparus, Actes Sud
- 2007: Le Désert de la grâce, Actes Sud
- 2008: Transhumance des ombres, Circa 1924
- 2010: Les Femmes du braconnier , Actes Sud

Short Stories

- 1985: Les Enfants des autres, Actes Sud
- 1989: Un si joli petit livre, Actes Sud, Prix de la Fondation Thyde-Monnier; Actes Sud Babel 1999
- 1991: Vous êtes toute seule ?, Actes Sud, prix de la nouvelle du Rotary Club; Actes Sud Babel 1994; Librio 1997
- 1993: La Chatière, Actes Sud
- 2001: Au Lecteur précoce, Actes Sud
- 2007: Sous les mets les mots, Nil

Poetry

- 2003: Instants incertitudes, Le Cherche midi éditeur

Diverse

- 2000: Celles qui savaient, Actes Sud

With Daniel Zimmermann

- 1995: Les Écritures mêlées, éditions Julliard
- 2000: Septuor, Le Cherche midi éditeur
- 2004: Duel. Correspondance 1973-1993, Le Cherche midi éditeur
- 2004: Championne à Olympie, Gallimard, Folio Junior

Collective Novel

- 1995: L'Affaire Grimaudi, Editions du Rocher (with Alain Absire, Jean-Claude Bologne, Michel Host, Dominique Noguez, Martin Winckler, Daniel Zimmermann)
