= Hellerhof =

City district of Düsseldorf, Germany

Coordinates: 51°07′56″N 6°54′23″E

Map of Düsseldorf, showing Hellerhof (in red) within Borough 10 (in pink)

Hellerhof (German pronunciation: [ˈhɛlɐˌhoːf]) is a quarter of the city of Düsseldorf, part of Borough 10. Düsseldorf-Hellerhof is in the far southeast part of Düsseldorf. It connects Düsseldorf with the towns of Langenfeld and Monheim am Rhein. It is a young quarter, founded in the middle 1970s. It has an area of 2.04 km^{2} (0.79 sq mi), and 5,737 inhabitants (2020).

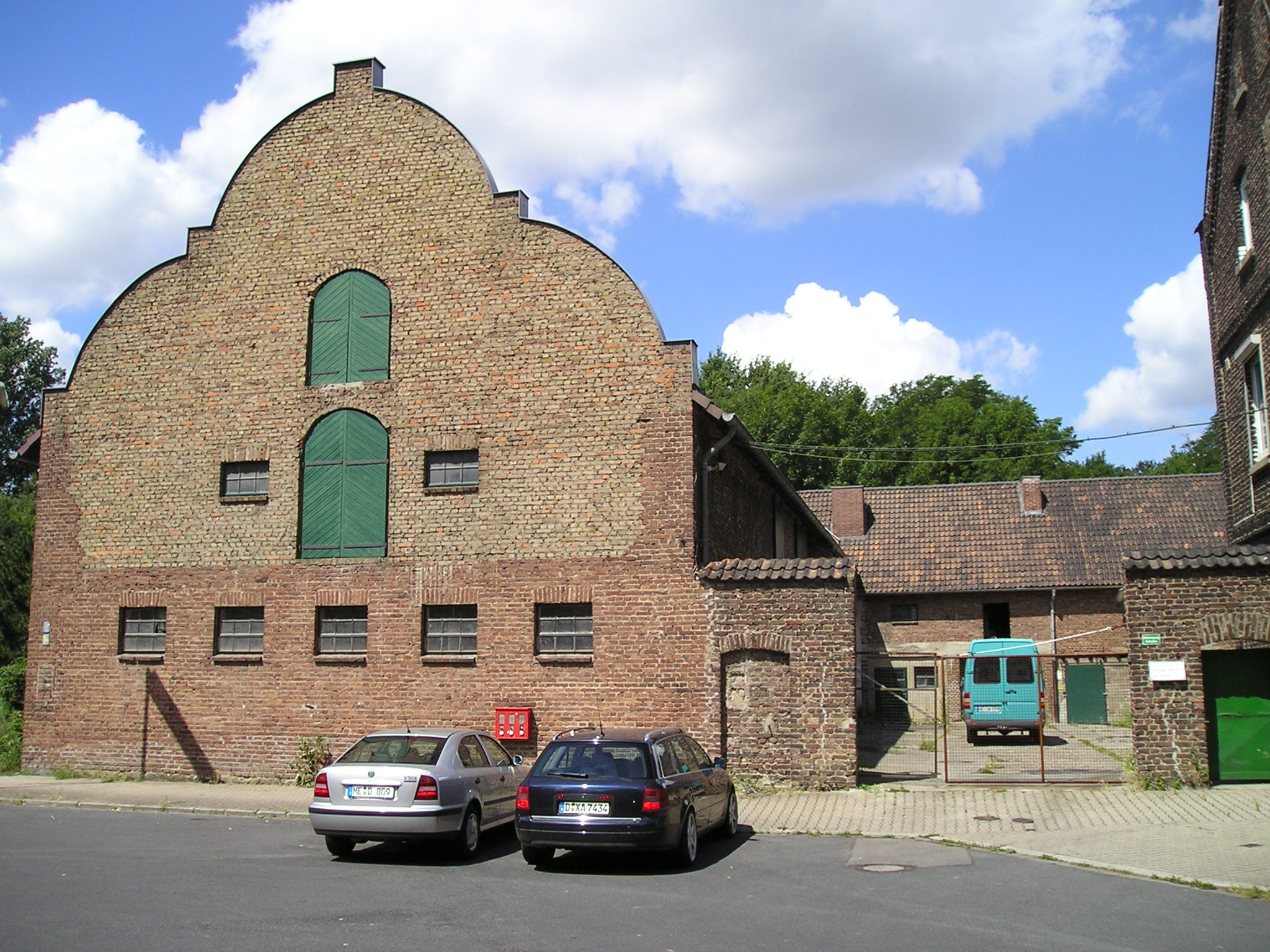
Hellerhof

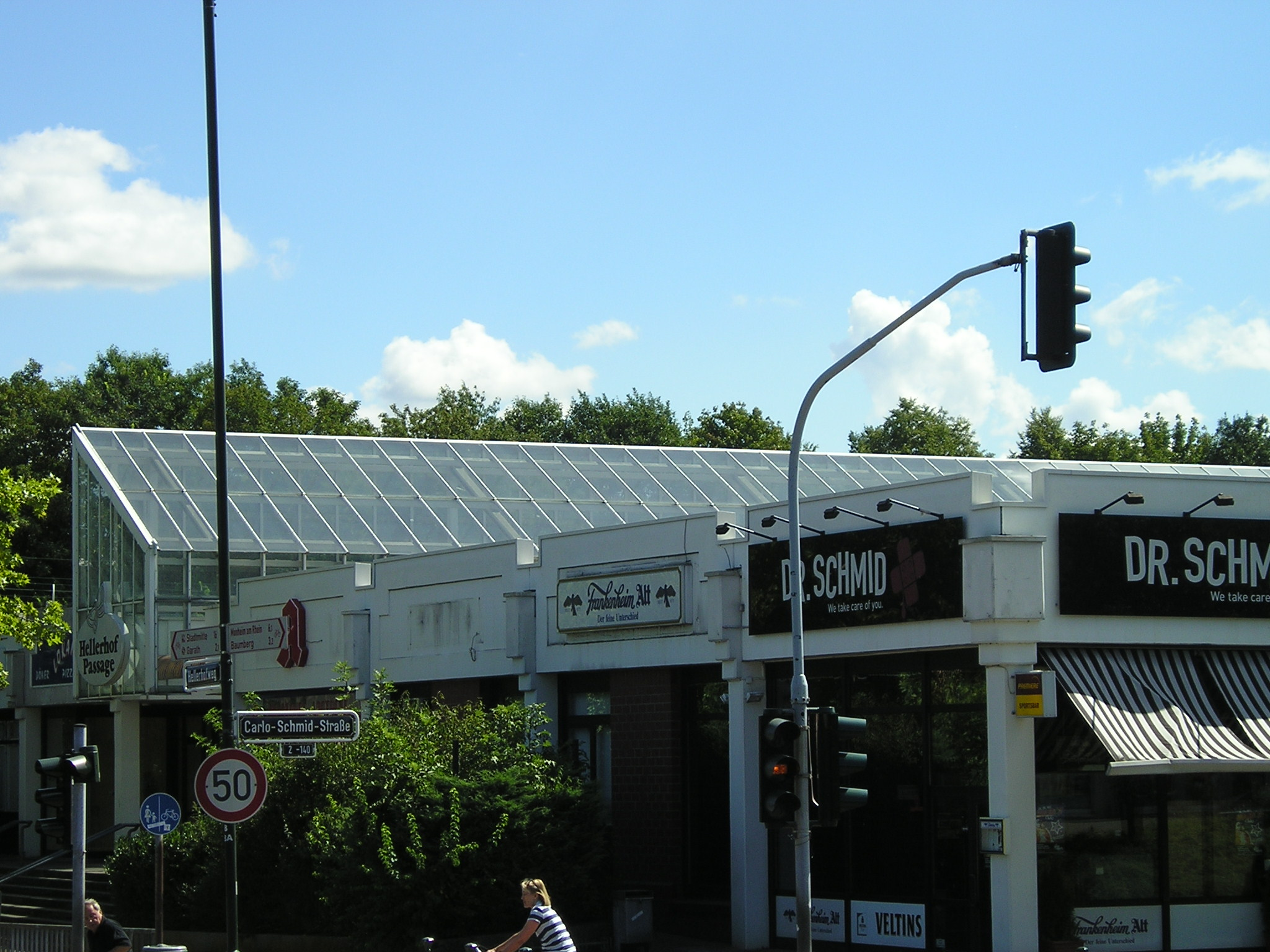
Hellerhof Passage(Shopping Mall)

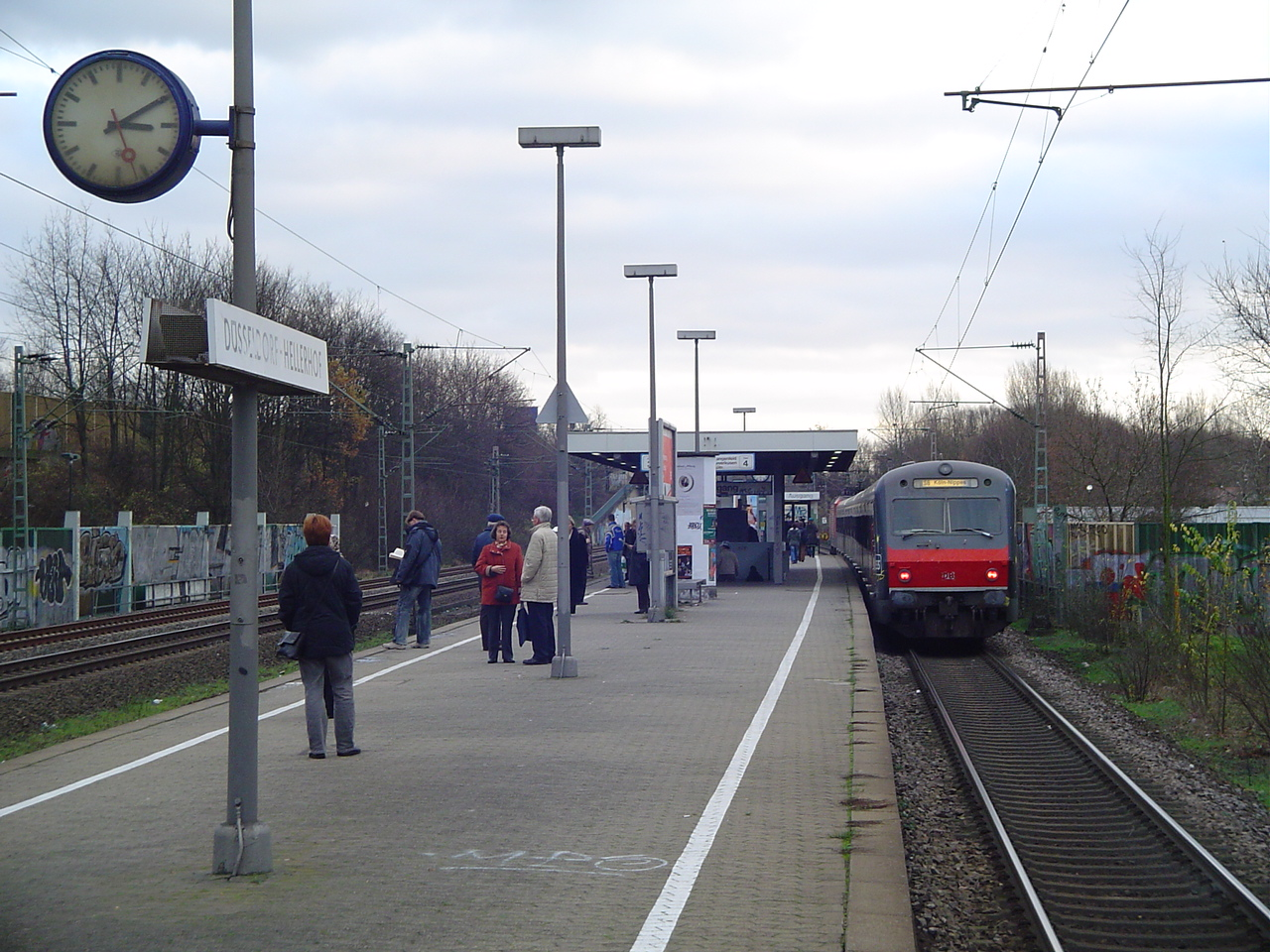
Düsseldorf-Hellerhof station

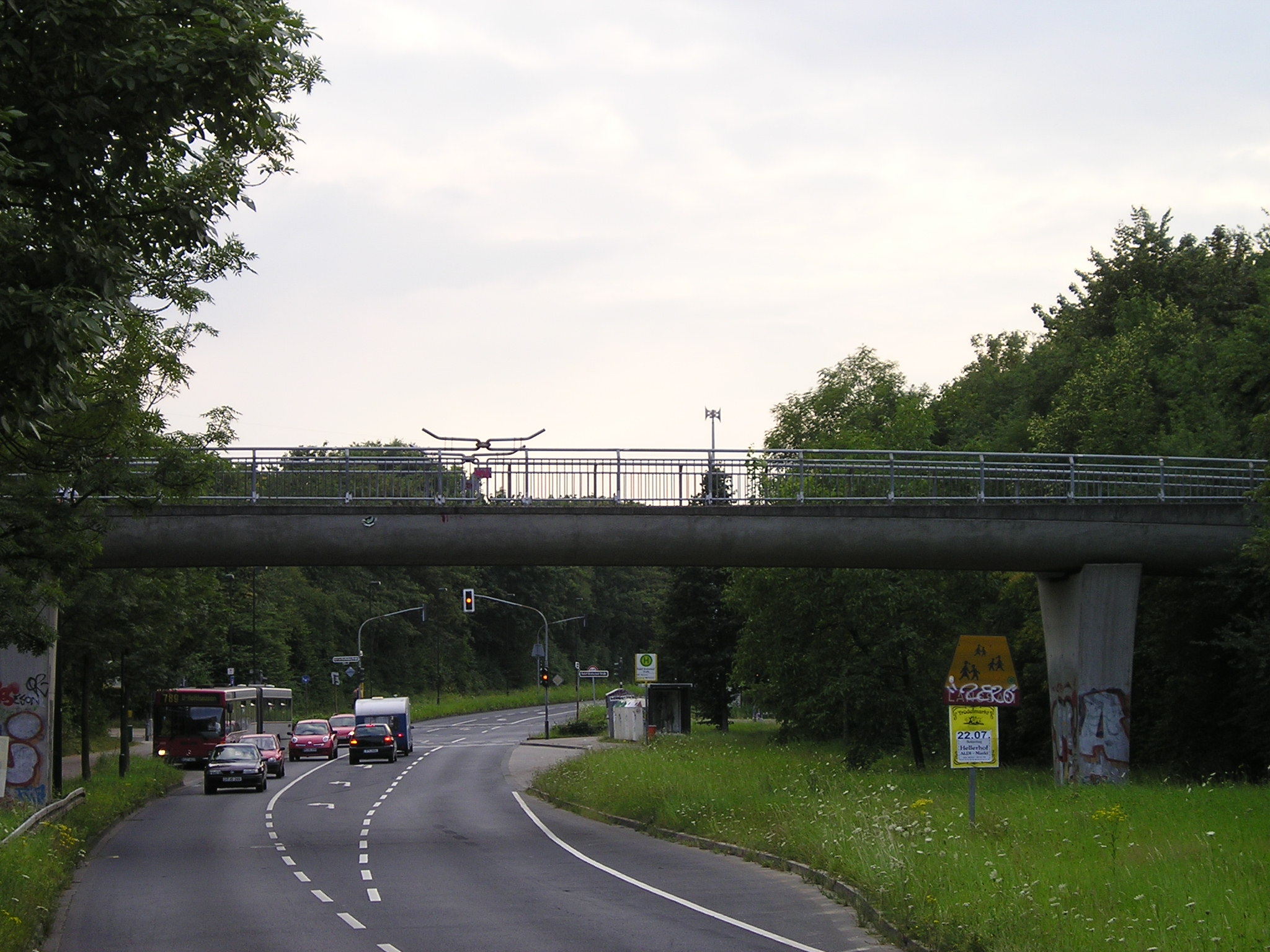
bus line

In contrast to its direct neighbour Garath, which consists mainly of projects, Hellerhof is socially in a far better social situation because there is much detached and semi-detached housing and only a few blocks of flats.

The name comes from an old farm, the Hellerhof (Heller's farm).

There is a commuter railway S-Bahn station and one bus line connecting Hellerhof with the rest of Düsseldorf.
