= Borough 10 (Düsseldorf) =

Stadtbezirk 10
- Borough of Düsseldorf
- Location of Stadtbezirk 10 within Düsseldorf
- Interactive map of Stadtbezirk 10
- Location within Germany Location within North Rhine-Westphalia
- Coordinates: 51°08′56″N 6°53′43″E
- Country: Germany
- State: North Rhine-Westphalia
- District: Urban district
- City: Düsseldorf
- Subdivisions: 2 quarters

Area
  - Total: 5.30 km^{2} (2.05 sq mi)

Population (2020-12-31)
  - Total: 24,785
  - Density: 4,680/km^{2} (12,100/sq mi)
- Time zone: UTC+01:00 (CET)
  - Summer (DST): UTC+02:00 (CEST)

Borough 10 (German: Stadtbezirk 10) is a southeastern borough of Düsseldorf, the state capital of North Rhine-Westphalia, Germany. The borough covers an area of 5.30 square kilometres and (as of December 2020) has about 25,000 inhabitants, which makes it the smallest borough both by area and by population. The borough borders with the Düsseldorf borough 9 and with the rural district of Mettmann.

== Subdivisions ==
Borough 10 is made up of two Stadtteile (city parts):

#	City part	Population (2020)	Area (km^{2})	Pop. per km^{2}
101	Garath	19,048	3.26	5,636
102	Hellerhof	5,737	2.04	2,973

== See also ==
- Boroughs of Düsseldorf
