= Neue Heimat =

German nonprofit construction company

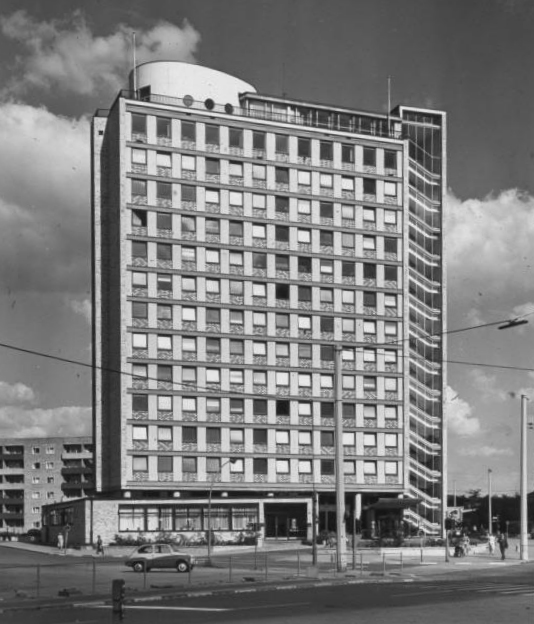
Company headquarters in Hohenfelde, Hamburg, built between 1956 and 1958, planned by Ernst May

Neue Heimat Gemeinnützige Wohnungs- und Siedlungsgesellschaft m.b.H., or Neue Heimat (NH) for short, was a nonprofit construction and housing company headquartered in Hamburg, Germany. The German Trade Union Confederation (DGB) and its affiliated individual trade unions owned the company. It originated from a nonprofit housing association founded in Hamburg in 1926. After 1950, Neue Heimat developed into the largest non-state housing construction company in Europe, creating more than 460,000 apartments by 1982. The year 1998 is regarded as the end of the group's liquidation.

After the expropriation of the trade union housing associations by the National Socialists, they and their housing stock became the property of the German Labor Front in 1933. In 1939, this Nazi organization established the name Neue Heimat. After the currency reform (1948), the founding of the Federal Republic of Germany (1949) and the return of the housing stocks and companies to the trade unions (1948-1955), a corporate group developed from Hamburg that was active in housing construction throughout West Germany during the post-war housing shortage. The company built housing estates in order to subsequently rent out the corresponding living space. It also offered owner-occupied apartments and detached houses.

In the “long sixties”“, Neue Heimat expanded into areas that were not subject to the German laws of "Wohnungsgemeinnützigkeit", i.e. non-profit housing. The rules of non-profit housing stipulated till 1990 that non-profit housing companies were granted tax breaks and state-subsidized loans in return for limiting company profits and keeping rents at a socially acceptable level. Neue Heimat started its activities in urban development, building hospitals, town halls or shopping centers, for example. At the same time, the company took up construction activities abroad. At the beginning of the 1970s, the corporate structure developed into a group of companies that pursued both non-profit and profit-oriented goals.

In 1973, more than 1.5 million people were living in Neue Heimat apartments. In the years following the first oil crisis of the same year, the company maintained its growth course despite considerable changes in the national and global economic situation. This led to serious financial problems, which ultimately resulted in the dissolution of Neue Heimat.

In 1982, reports in the news magazine Der Spiegel triggered a crisis of legitimacy for the group that could no longer be overcome. They revealed that the majority of the Management Board members had enriched themselves to the detriment of the company and the tenants. In September 1986, the trade unions sold the group at short notice at a symbolic price to Horst Schiesser, a medium-sized entrepreneur from outside the industry. A few weeks later, this transaction had to be reversed. Subsequently, the housing stock was gradually sold in smaller and larger tranches, mainly in regionalized form; subsidiaries were also sold or wound up.

The costs that the DGB and the individual trade unions had to bear as a result of the liquidation process of the profit-oriented part of the group alone are estimated at DM 1 billion; the financial burdens and losses caused by the liquidation of the nonprofit part of the group are unclear.

Buildings and large housing estates of Neue Heimat

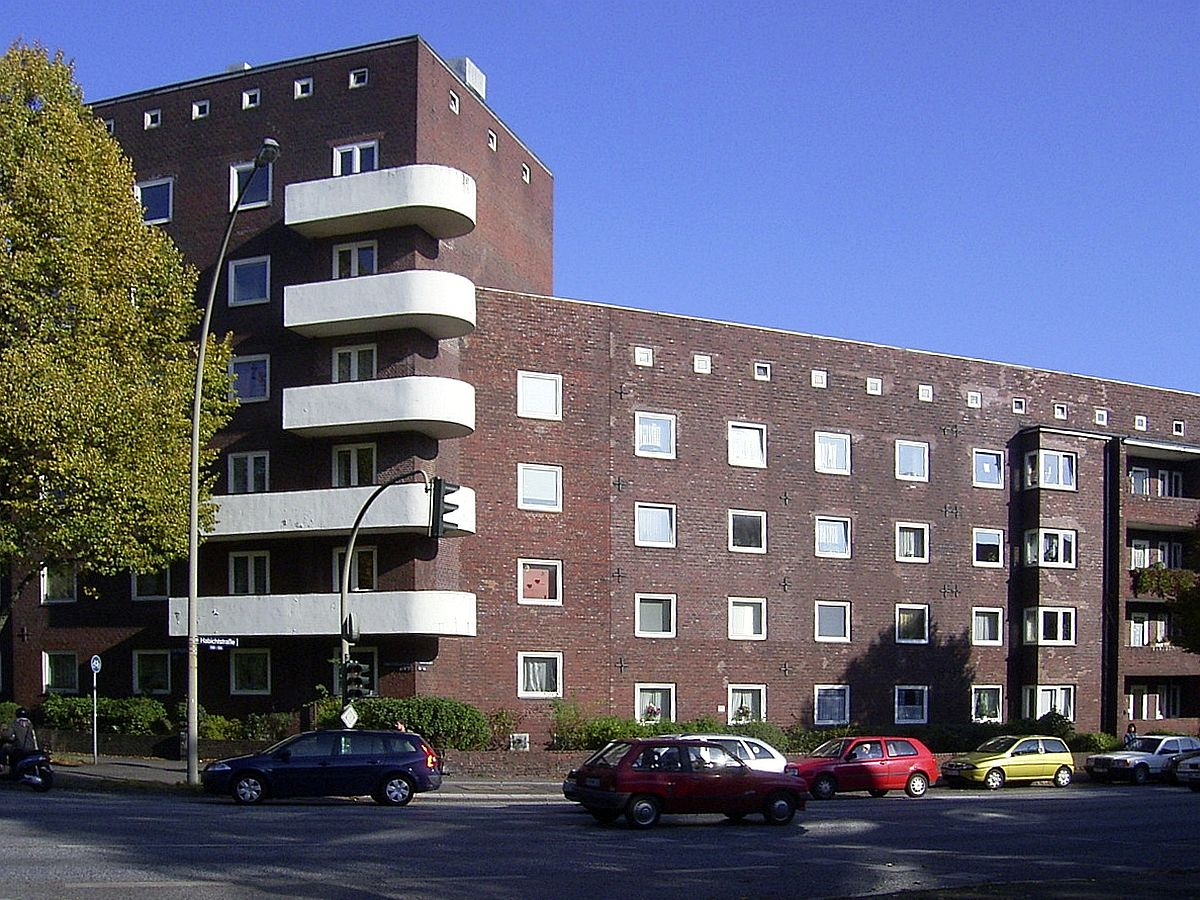
Block of flats in Barmbek-Nord, Hamburg, rebuilt after World War II

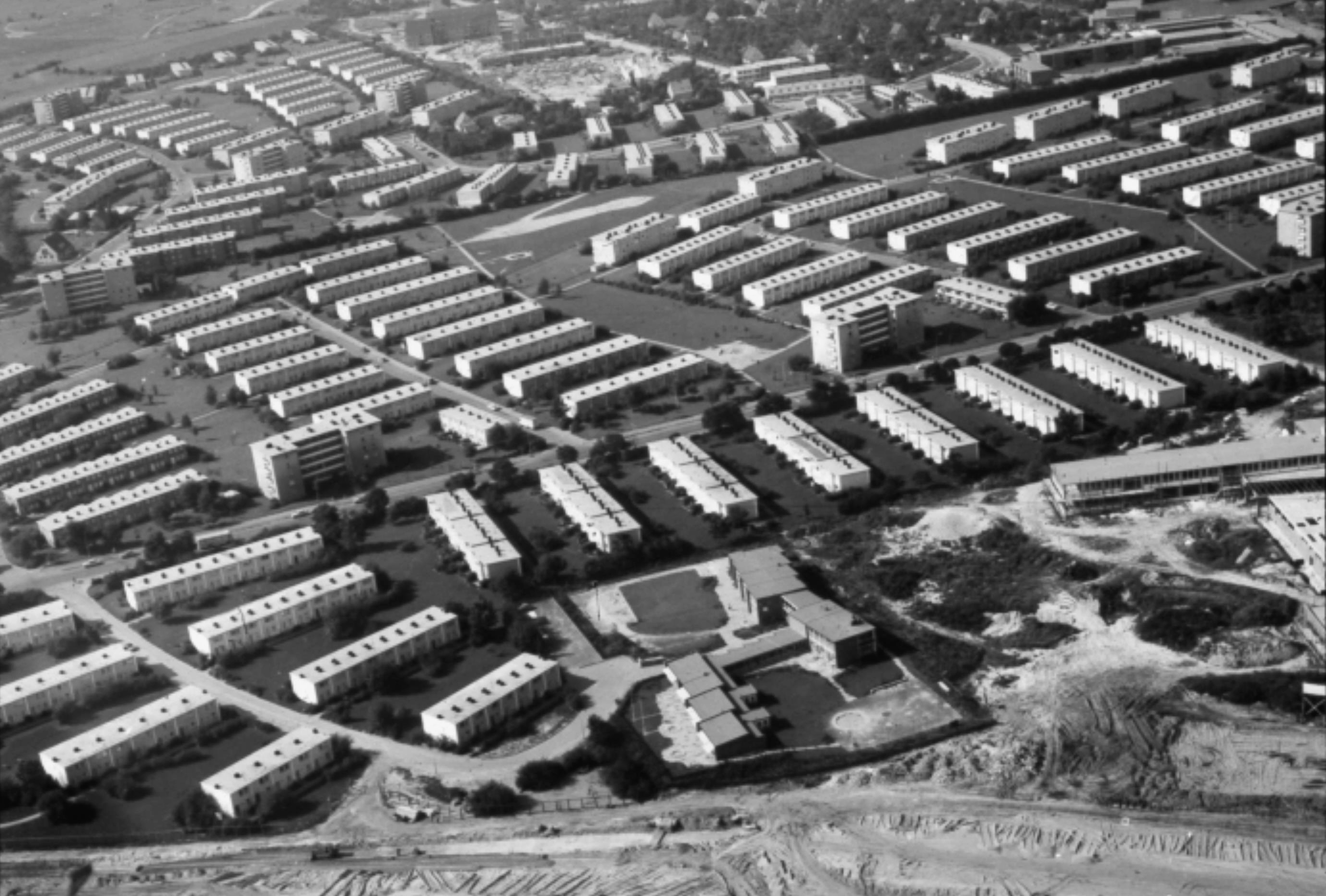
Aerial view of "Gartenstadt Farmsen", Hamburg, built in 1953/54

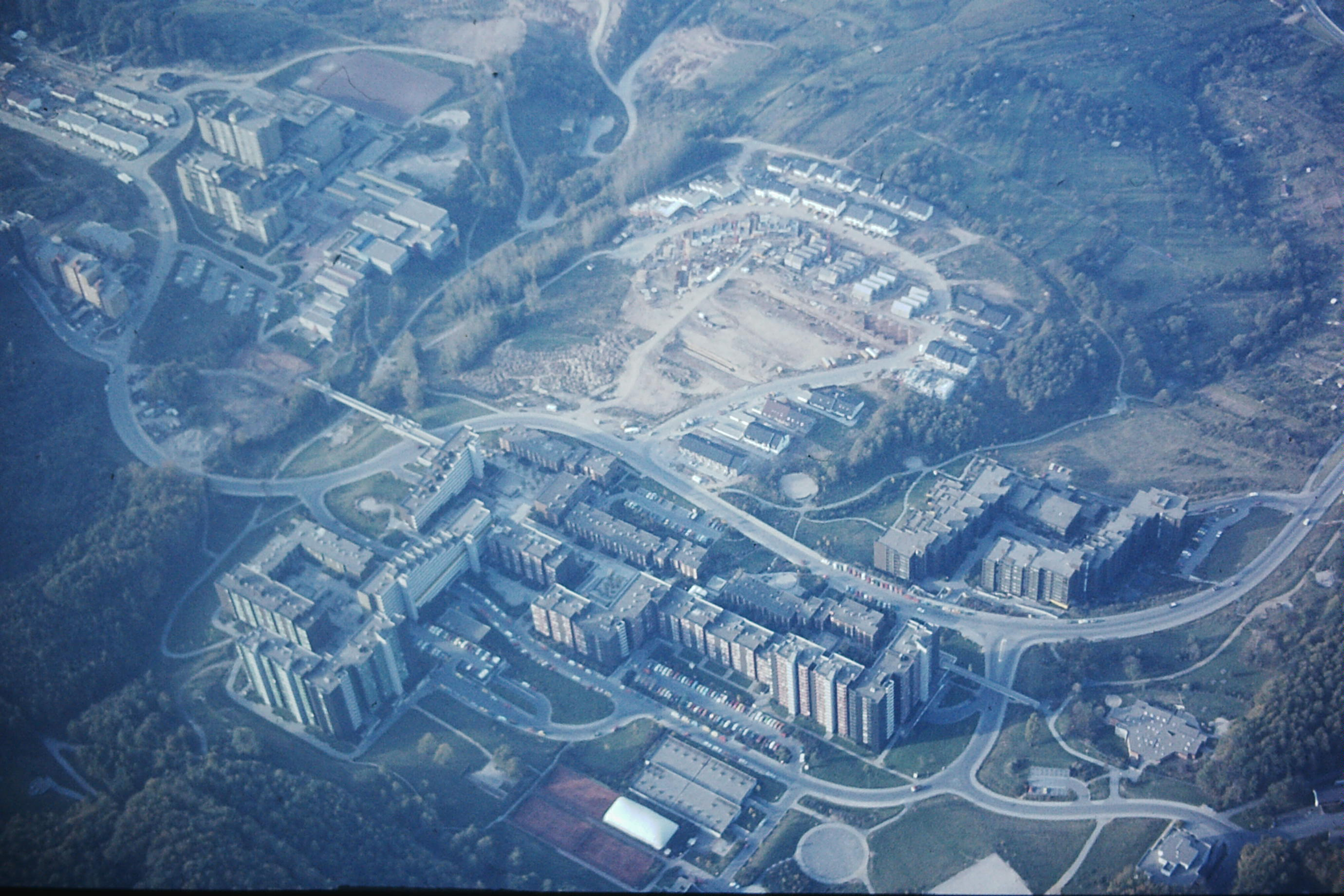
Aerial view of Emmertsgrund, Heidelberg, built from 1971 to 1978

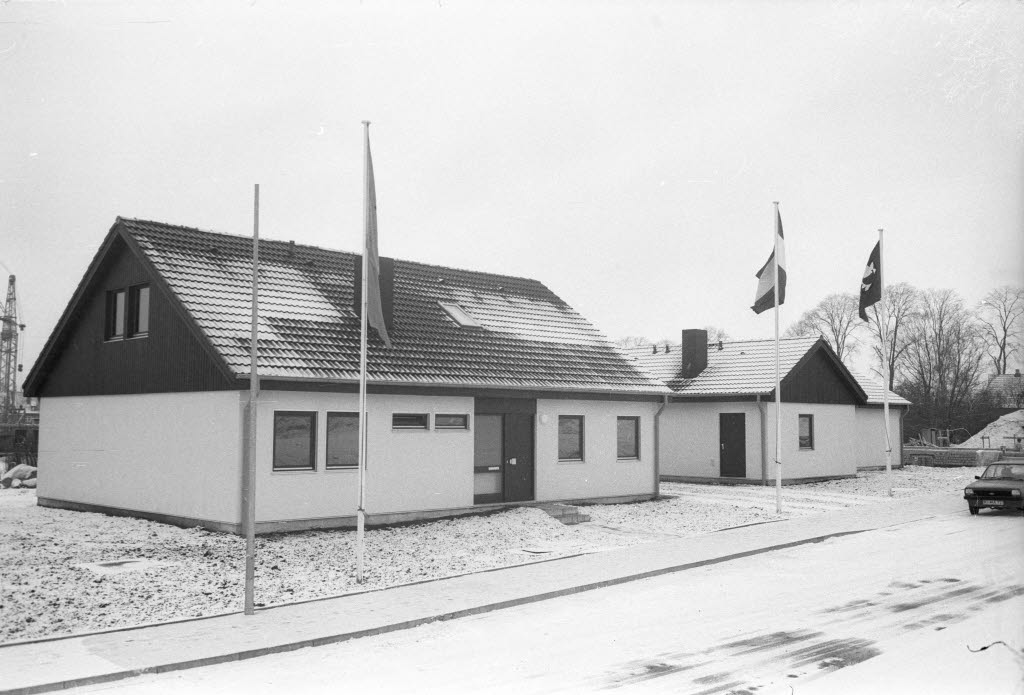
Neue Heimat show houses in Kiel-Suchsdorf

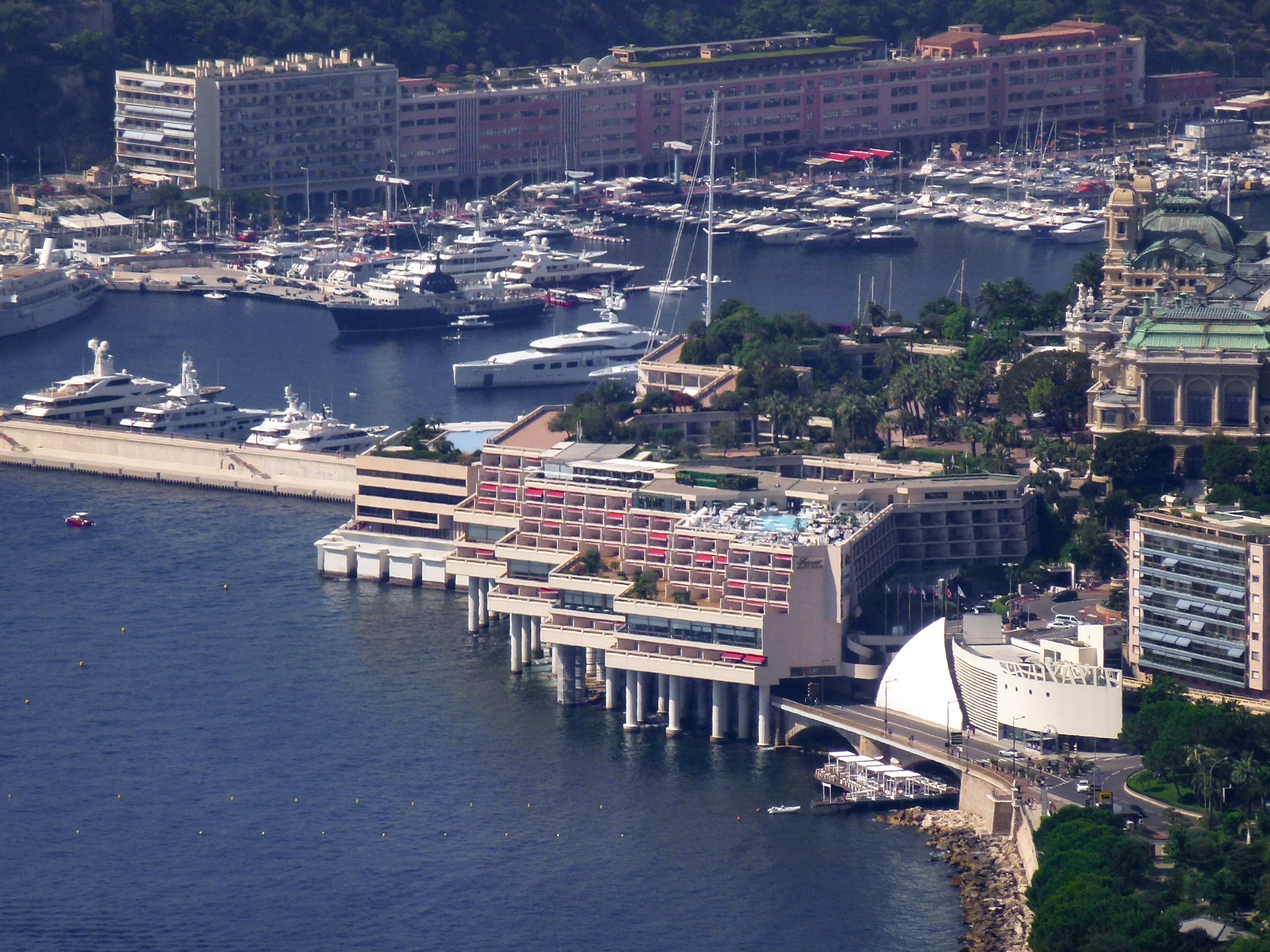
Convention center and hotel partly built on stilts directly by the sea in Monaco (construction period 1972-1978): today's Fairmont Monte Carlo

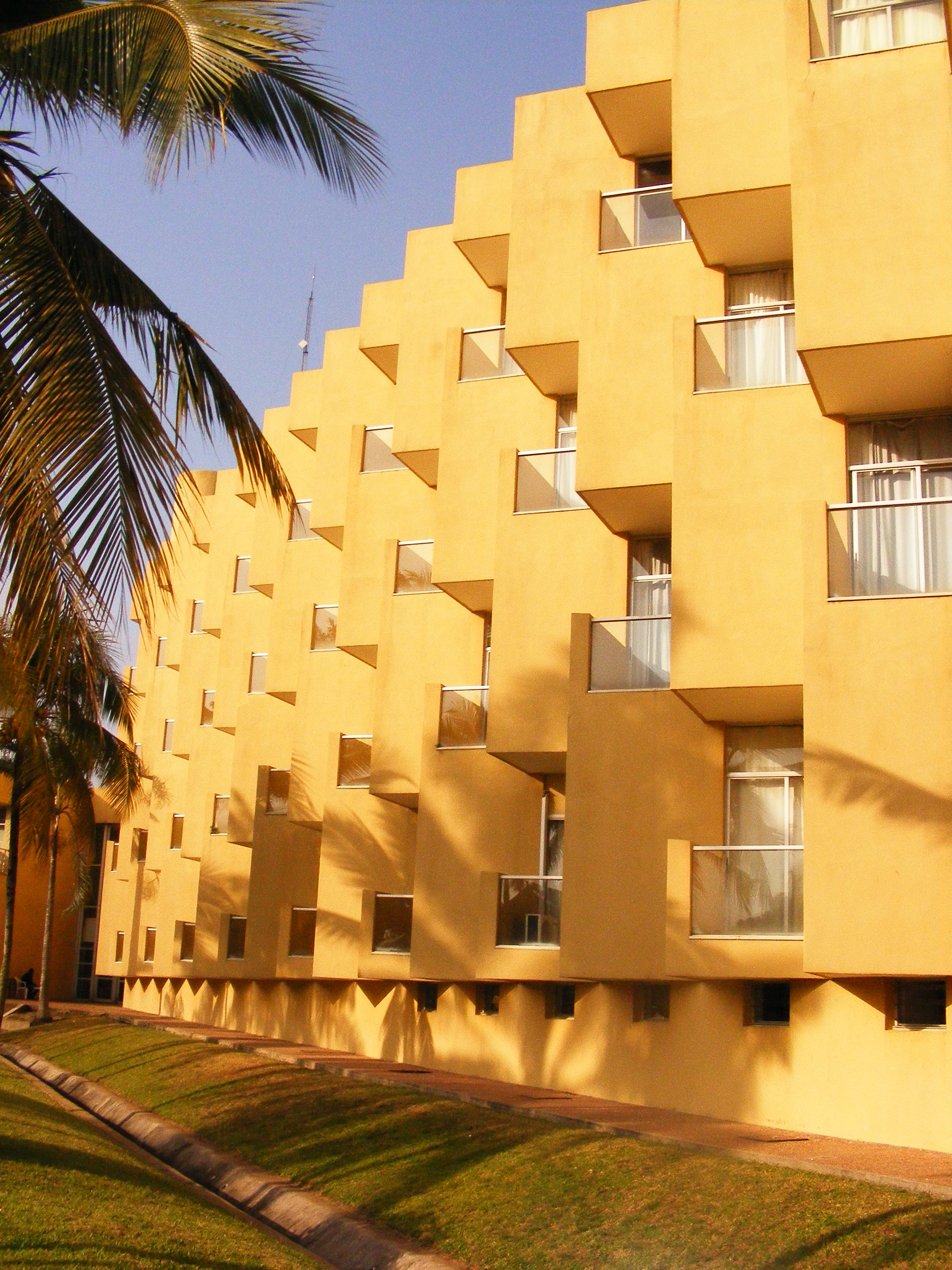
Hotel du Golf in Abidjan, Ivory Coast, completed in 1976
