= Friedenskirche (Monheim-Baumberg) =

Protestant church

Coordinates: 51°07′05″N 6°53′39″E

The Friedenskirche (Peace Church) is a Protestant church in Monheim-Baumberg, Schellingstraße 13, built from 1968 to 1974 according to the plans of Walter Maria Foerderer in the Brutalist style.

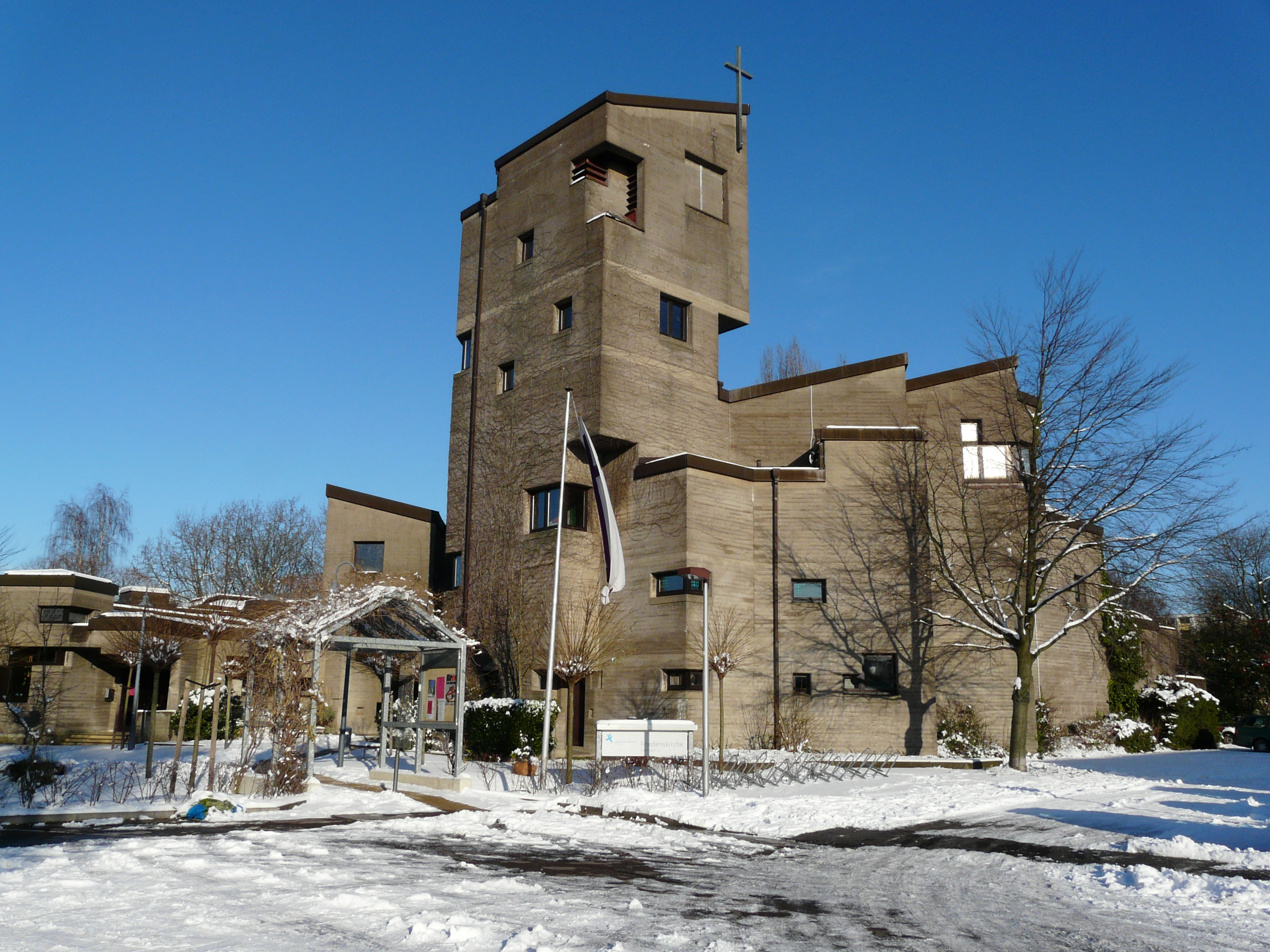
Friedenskirche Baumberg

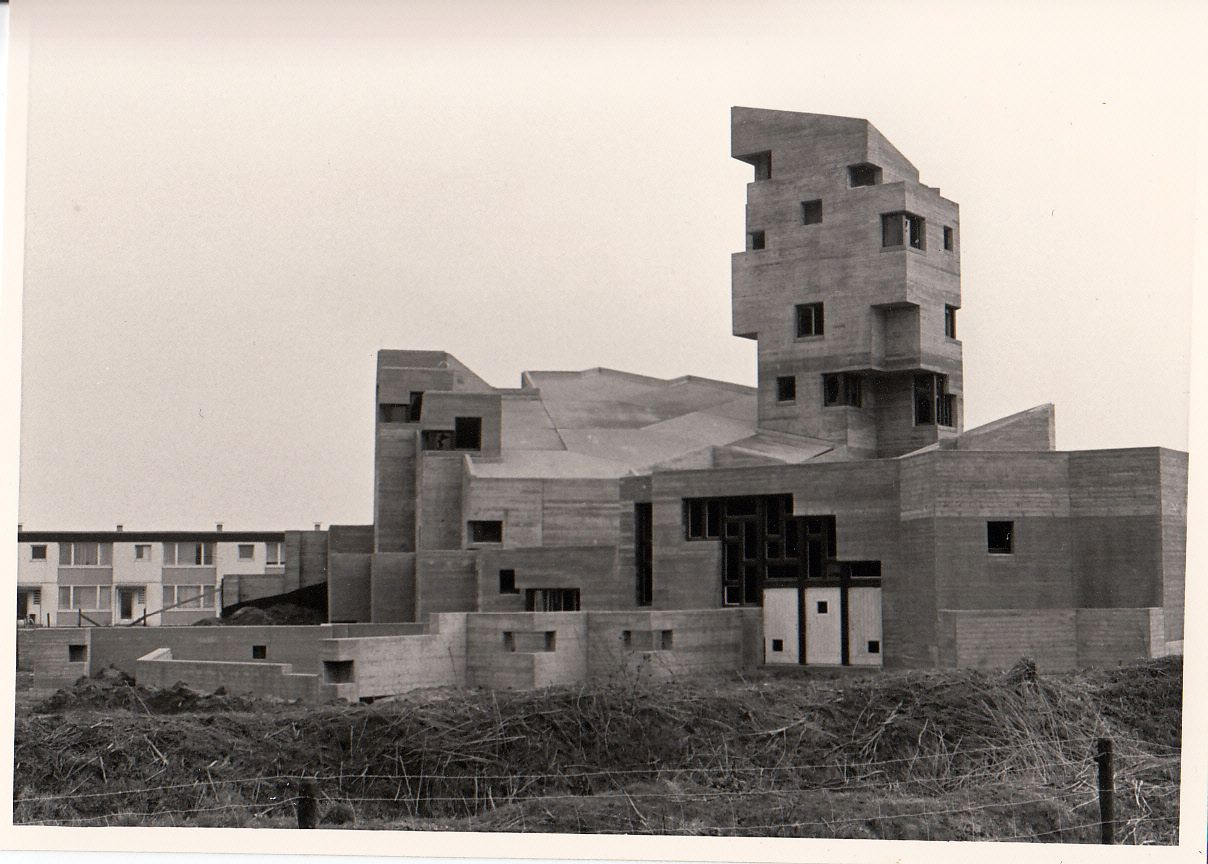
Construction phase

== Construction ==
In the post-war years, the population of Baumberg increased sharply. Consequently, in the 1960s, a spacious development area was elaborated under the leadership of the union-owned construction company "Neue Heimat" adjacent to the historic center. The Frankfurt architect Ernst May was involved in the planning of this area, which included a center for the protestant parish, grown to around 3,000 members in the post-war years. In addition to the church, the complex should also include staff apartments and a kindergarten. An area between the old town center and the new development area was chosen for the project. Following a competition, the Protestant Church in the Rhineland decided in favor of a design by the Swiss architect Walter Maria Foerderer. He directed personally the construction work in the early years, but later transferred the supervision to his office and to the Monheim architect Dietrich Mallwitz, who more or less independently implemented the concept for the adjacent buildings.

After construction began in 1968, the church was consecrated on 9 May 1971, and the complex was officially completed in 1974. Due to its external appearance it was initially called the "Bunker", but the church was renamed "Friedenskirche" in the eighties.

The tower, reminiscent of a Swiss mountain, received three bells in 1983 from the Eifeler Glockengiesserei. In 2003, finally, the concrete wall, which separated the church square to the south from the neighbourhood, was opened. The open forecourt, which is bordered by 13 ball acacias, can be reached via a small bridge that leads over an artificial watercourse.

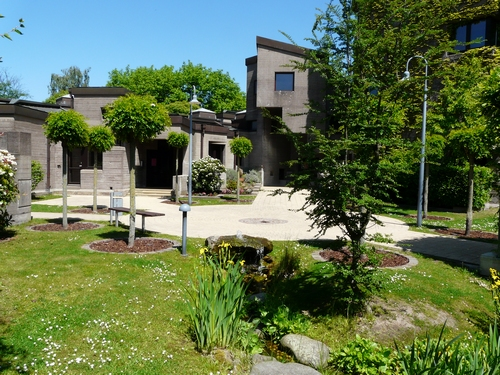
Forecourt

== Architecture ==
=== Concept ===
Like other of Förderer's works, the Friedenskirche, with its construction method in exposed concrete, is associated with Brutalism – a view that is not shared by all architecture experts. Between 1963 and 1971 the trained sculptor built community centers with an integrated church in a similar style, mainly in Switzerland, but also in Germany. Examples are the Protestant parish hall in Moers-Hochstrass, St. John in Lucerne and the Holy Cross Church in Chur, whose alpine silhouette is reminiscent of the Friedenskirche. These buildings are open meeting places and designed as a walk-in sculpture with clearly recognizable sculptural orientation. However, Foerderer's vision of a hall that could be used for secular events beyond worship and confessional boundaries was not fully implemented. The Friedenskirche became a sacred architectural work of art instead of a multifunctional building.

=== Structure ===
The highest point of the complex is the crystal-shaped community center: an emergent, 23 m tall bell tower, which is connected to the east to the church and to the northwest to various community rooms. Attached there is a church hall with a stage for up to 200 people and other meeting rooms. The rooms in the basement have access to the amphitheater. A flat-roofed two-storey staff building with seven apartments is attached to the southwestern side of the complex and a kindergarten eastward. The buildings are horseshoe-shaped, with a south-facing church square.

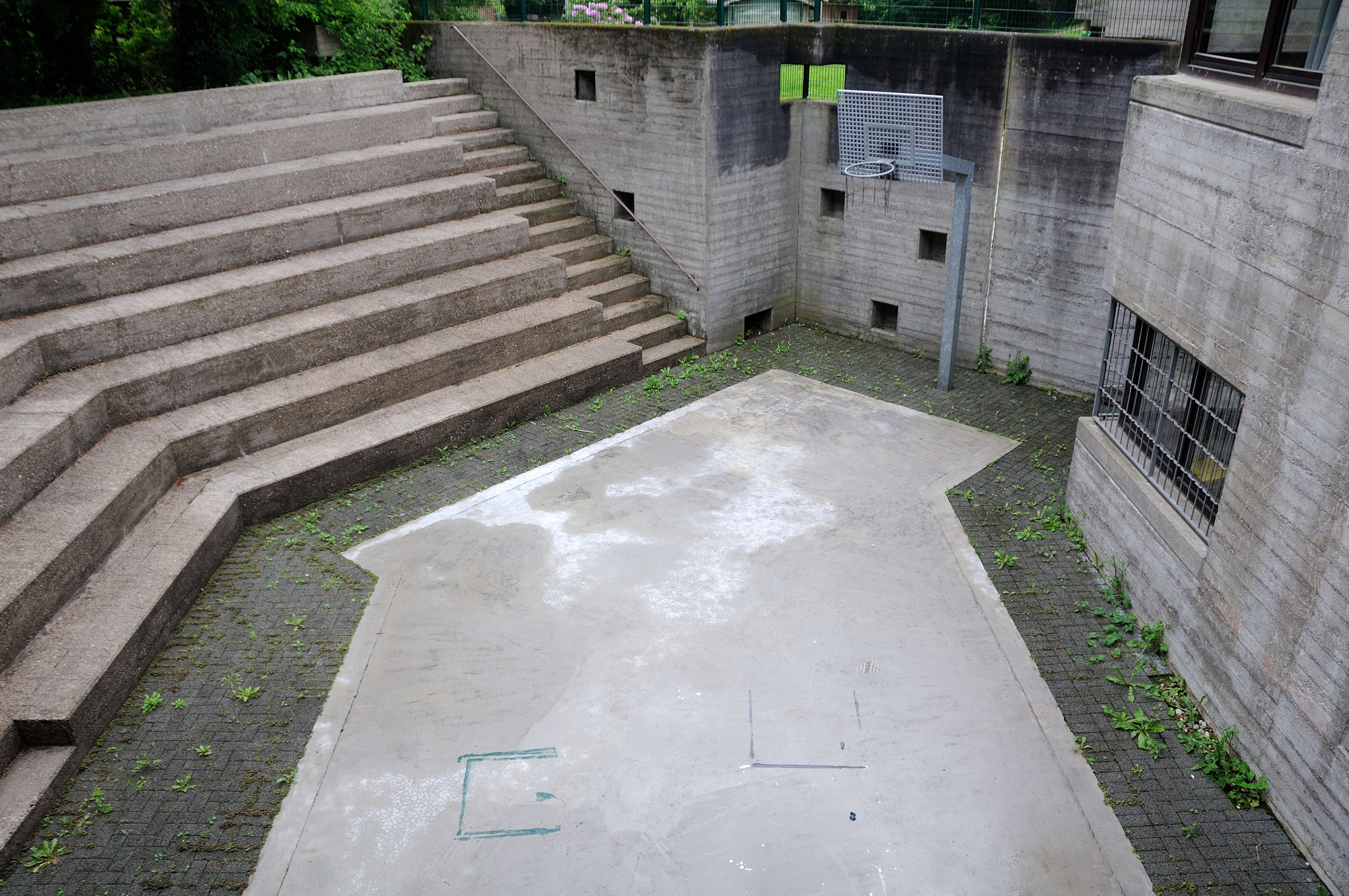
Amphitheater

=== Interior ===
The concrete walls outside and inside show the grain of the detailed wooden formwork. Geometric forms with partly religious meaning were built with elaborated techniques, and the cross is repeated in numerous outer and inner walls. Arrows in the ceiling symbolize the Holy Spirit pointing in all directions. Niches and galleries, recesses and apertures inspire new liturgical forms, and so does the movable equipment – from the flexible seating to the baptistery and altar (the baptistery and altar cross were designed by the Baumberger artist Hans Schweizer).

Single, small windows illuminate the room with a subdued light. Fourteen different electric light settings allow a very differentiated lighting of the church and the gallery. A screen (2 × 2 m) in the altar area allows a rear projection of images and texts for worship and events. To allow for a kind of dialogue sermon, the architect had planned two lecterns to be placed in concrete niches in the altar wall, which however have not been implemented. Foerderer intended the active involvement of church members in the organization of the service and thus wanted to invite for an intensive discussion of the Bible. Large lenten veils at the walls and a short-pile carpet provide excellent acoustics, so that the worship room is also often used for concerts. Throughout the center, elements such as orange doors or green window frames and benches add vivacious color accents.

Due to its importance in architectural history, the entire community center was declared a listed monument in December 2018, with the church building receiving the highest level of protection, and the staff buildings and the kindergarten the lowest level.

== See also ==
- List of Brutalist structures
