= Monheim am Rhein =

- Town
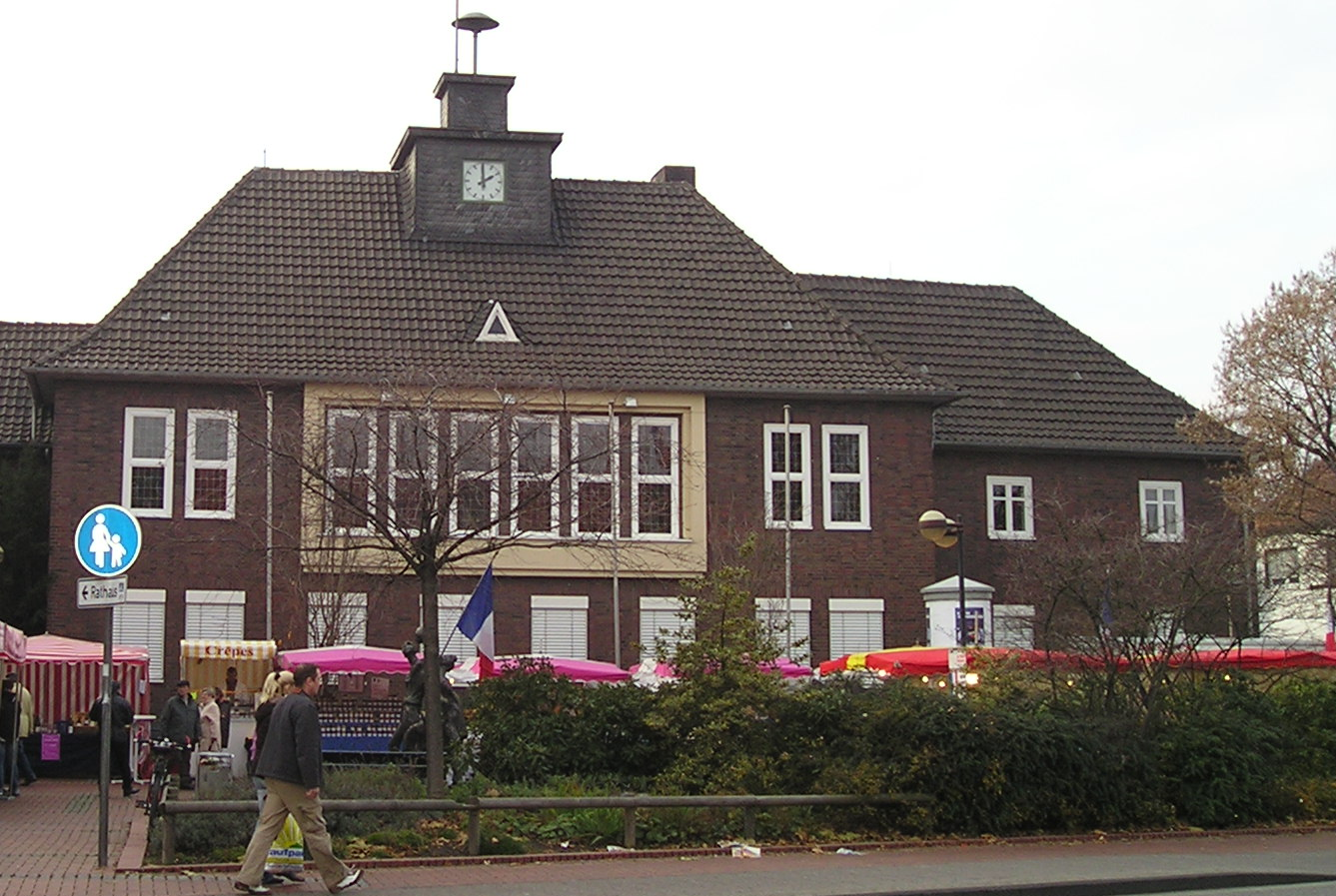
- Town hall

- Flag Coat of arms

- Location of Monheim am Rhein within Mettmann district
- Interactive map of Monheim am Rhein
- Location within Germany Location within North Rhine-Westphalia
- Coordinates: 51°06′N 6°54′E
- Country: Germany
- State: North Rhine-Westphalia
- Admin. region: Düsseldorf
- District: Mettmann
- Subdivisions: 2

Government
  - Mayor (2025–30): Sonja Wienecke (Ind.)

Area
  - Total: 23.05 km^{2} (8.90 sq mi)
- Elevation: 35–45 m (115–148 ft)

Population (2025-12-31)
  - Total: 43,716
  - Density: 1,897/km^{2} (4,912/sq mi)
- Time zone: UTC+01:00 (CET)
  - Summer (DST): UTC+02:00 (CEST)
- Postal codes: 40789
- Dialling codes: 02173
- Vehicle registration: ME
- Website: www.monheim.de

Monheim am Rhein (German pronunciation: [ˈmoːnhaɪm ʔam ˈʁaɪn, ˈmɔn-], lit. 'Monheim at the Rhine'; Limburgish: Monnem) is a town on the right (eastern) bank of the river Rhine in North Rhine-Westphalia, Germany. Monheim belongs to the district of Mettmann – with the southern suburbs of Düsseldorf to the north, and the Bergisches Land to the east and the city of Cologne to the south. It consists of the city districts (from north to south) Baumberg (about one third) and Monheim (two thirds). Its typical dialect, the Monnemer Platt belongs to the Ripuarian language.

== Adjacent cities and districts ==
The following cities and districts border Monheim am Rhein: to the north Düsseldorf, to the east Langenfeld (also part of the district of Mettmann), to the south Leverkusen and (both divided by the river Rhine) Cologne to the southwest, and Dormagen to the west (part of the district of Neuss).

== History ==
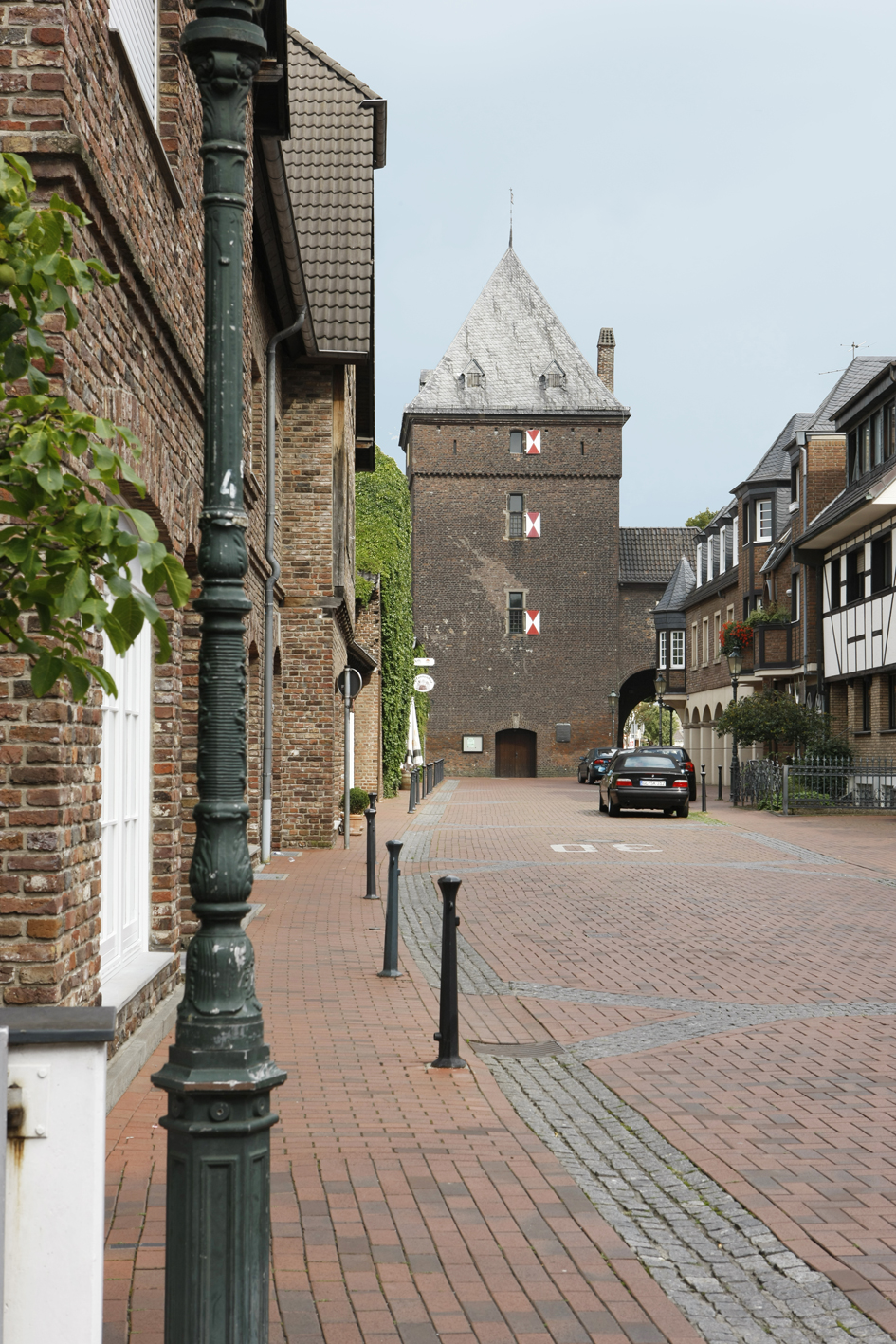
Schelmenturm

Monheim has approximately 850 years of recorded history. It was first documented in 1150 as a fishermen's village in the Grafschaft (Earldom) Berg. It became the administrative centre for the surrounding villages (including many of the villages that now form Düsseldorf) in 1363, and stayed in that position until Napoleon formed the Rhine Confederation in 1806. Monheim, Baumberg and Hitdorf were then combined into a municipal corporation. Monheim gained city status in 1960, ten years after it finally incorporated the neighbouring villages Baumberg and Hitdorf. At the end of 1974 Monheim was incorporated by Düsseldorf as part of a major municipal corporation reform. After a successful complaint in the federal state's constitutional court in Münster, the city became independent again on 1 July 1976, but lost Hitdorf to Leverkusen. Since 1994 the official city name has been Monheim am Rhein.

== Population ==
Historical population

Year	Pop.	±% p.a.
1965	16,559	—
1970	32,457	+14.41%
1975	37,318	+2.83%
1980	40,550	+1.68%
1985	40,512	−0.02%
1990	42,656	+1.04%
1995	43,811	+0.54%

Year	Pop.	±% p.a.
2000	43,514	−0.14%
2005	43,705	+0.09%
2010	43,063	−0.30%
2015	40,885	−1.03%
2020	41,279	+0.19%
2025	43,716	+1.15%

Source: Landesdatabank Nordrhein-Westfalen

== Sites of interest ==
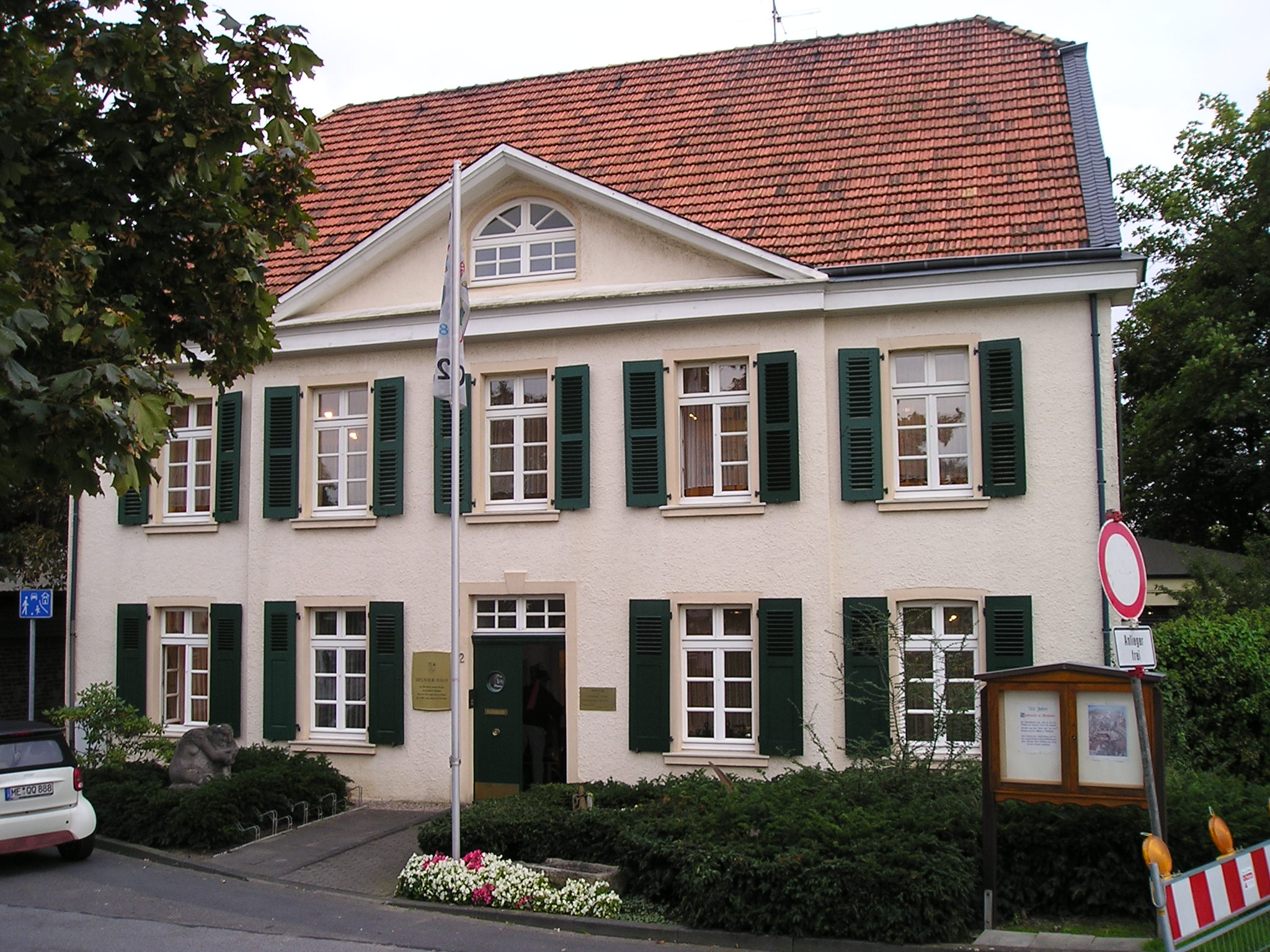
Deusserhaus

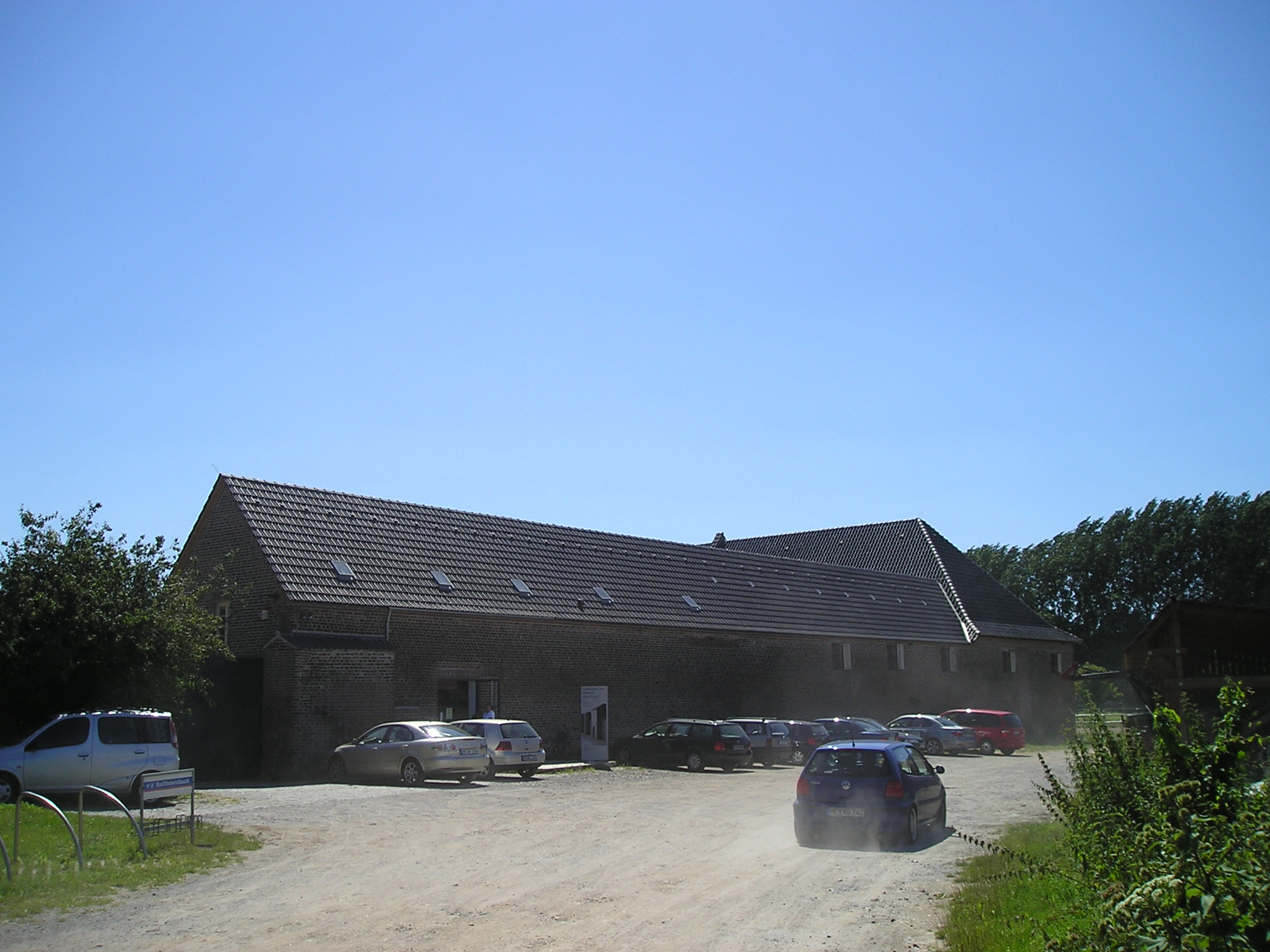
Archaeological museum Haus Bürgel

- Schelmenturm – The 26m-high (85 ft) landmark of Monheim is a tower from the early 15th century, which was part of the former fortification built by the Earls of Berg. Since 1972, the tower has been reorganised, also being used as a cultural meeting place.
- Deusserhaus – The Deusser manor house, built around 1848, today is the museum of the Heimatbund (local history society) Monheim e.V.
- Haus Bürgel – This house is located on the border between Baumberg and Düsseldorf in a landscape conservation area called "Urdenbacher Kämpe", a flood plain of the Rhine. The earliest source from 1019 states that the "Castrum in Burgela" was built in the 4th century as part of the Roman defences against the Franks on the left bank of the Rhine. In the 14th century, the broadly meandering river changed its bed after a flood, so that Haus Bürgel is actually on the right bank of the Rhine today. Some remains of the Roman walls are still visible, although the place was transformed into a larger Frankish manor house. In recent years, it has been used as a museum and biological-environmental research and information station.
- Gänselieselbrunnen – The fountain known locally as Gänselieselbrunnen is located next to the town hall of Monheim am Rhein.
- Friedenskirche - The Friedenskirche (Peace Church) is a Protestant church in Monheim-Baumberg, built from 1968 to 1974 according to the plans of Walter Maria Foerderer and an outstanding example of Brutalism in the Rhineland.

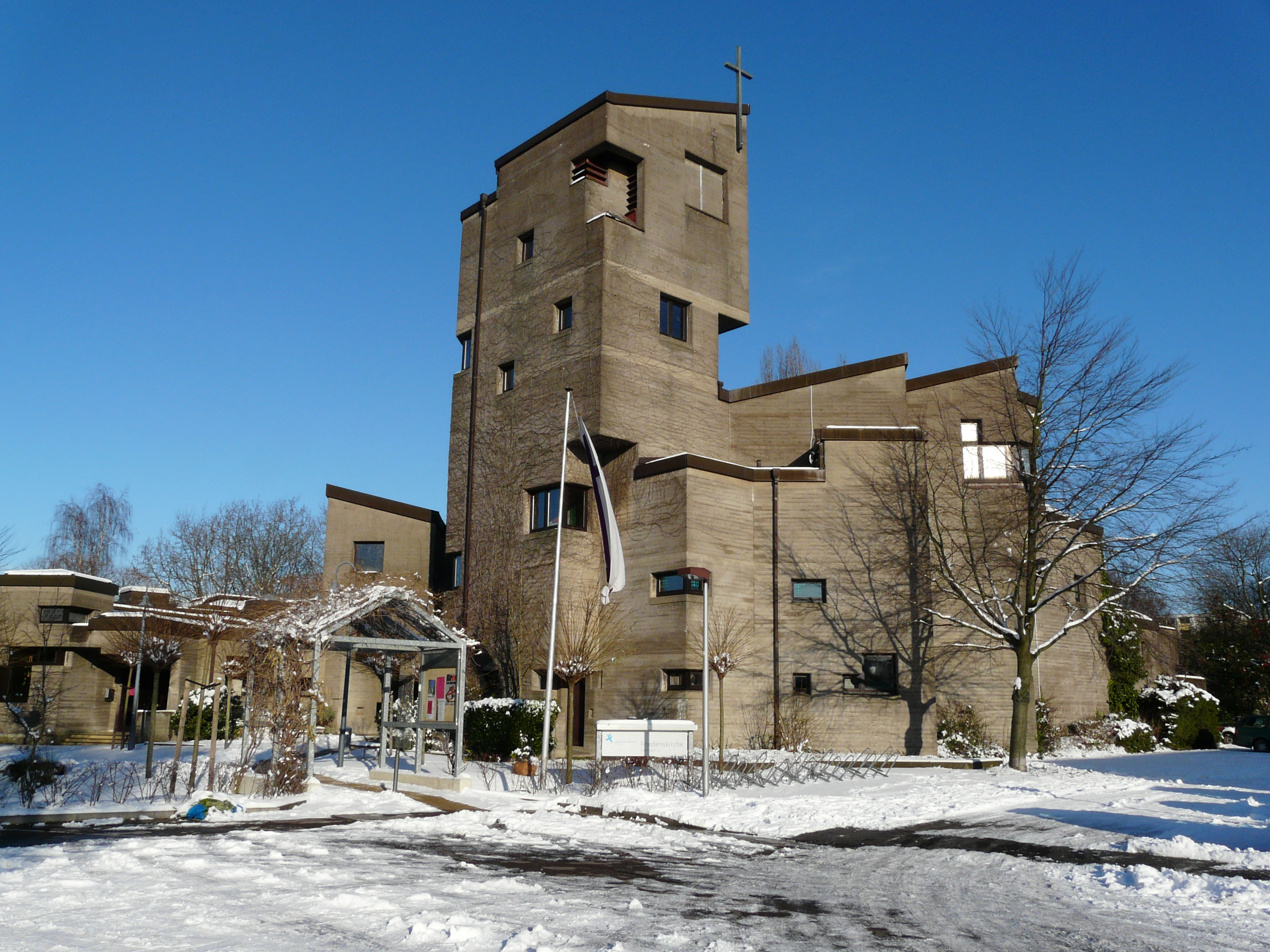
Friedenskirche Baumberg

- Franz Boehm Memorial - The Catholic priest Franz Boehm, who became a parish priest in St. Gereon in 1938, was a resistance fighter against the Nazi regime who died in 1945 in the Dachau concentration camp. A life-size bronze bust was erected in his honor in 2020 to mark his 140th birthday. Behind the life-size bust are two panes, each measuring 4.2 meters by 2.25 meters, which was designed by Thomas Kesseler using the silkscreen technique.

== Transport ==
Monheim is part of both of the public transport associations Verkehrsverbund Rhein-Ruhr (VRR) and the Verkehrsverbund Rhein-Sieg (VRS), situated on their borders. There are several bus lines running between the city districts, neighbouring towns, and the closest S-Bahn railway stations on the border with Langenfeld, Langenfeld-Berghausen station and Langenfeld (Rheinland) station, as well as Düsseldorf. The Monheim ticket has enabled citizens of Monheim to use public transport free of charge within Monheim am Rhein and the neighbouring town Langenfeld (VRR tariff zone 73) as well as to the near train station in Düsseldorf, Düsseldorf-Hellerhof station since 1 April 2020. This was prolonged by the town council until 31 March 2025.

Many of Monheim's residents are commuters to nearby Düsseldorf (20 minutes) and Cologne (30 minutes). The A59 is connected to Monheim which connects to the nearby A46, as is the A542 which connects with the nearby A3 and A1.

The town is in the vicinity of both Düsseldorf Airport and the Cologne Bonn Airport.

== Music ==
The second movement of Godspeed You! Black Emperor's song "Sleep" derives its name from the town. The composition appeared on their 2000 studio album Lift Your Skinny Fists like Antennas to Heaven.

== Twin towns – sister cities ==
Monheim am Rhein is twinned with:

- Wiener Neustadt, Austria (1971)
- Tirat Carmel, Israel (1989)
- Delitzsch, Germany (1990)
- Bourg-la-Reine, France (2000)
- Malbork, Poland (2005)
- Ataşehir, Turkey (2015)
