= Düsseldorf Marathon =

Annual race in Germany held since 2003

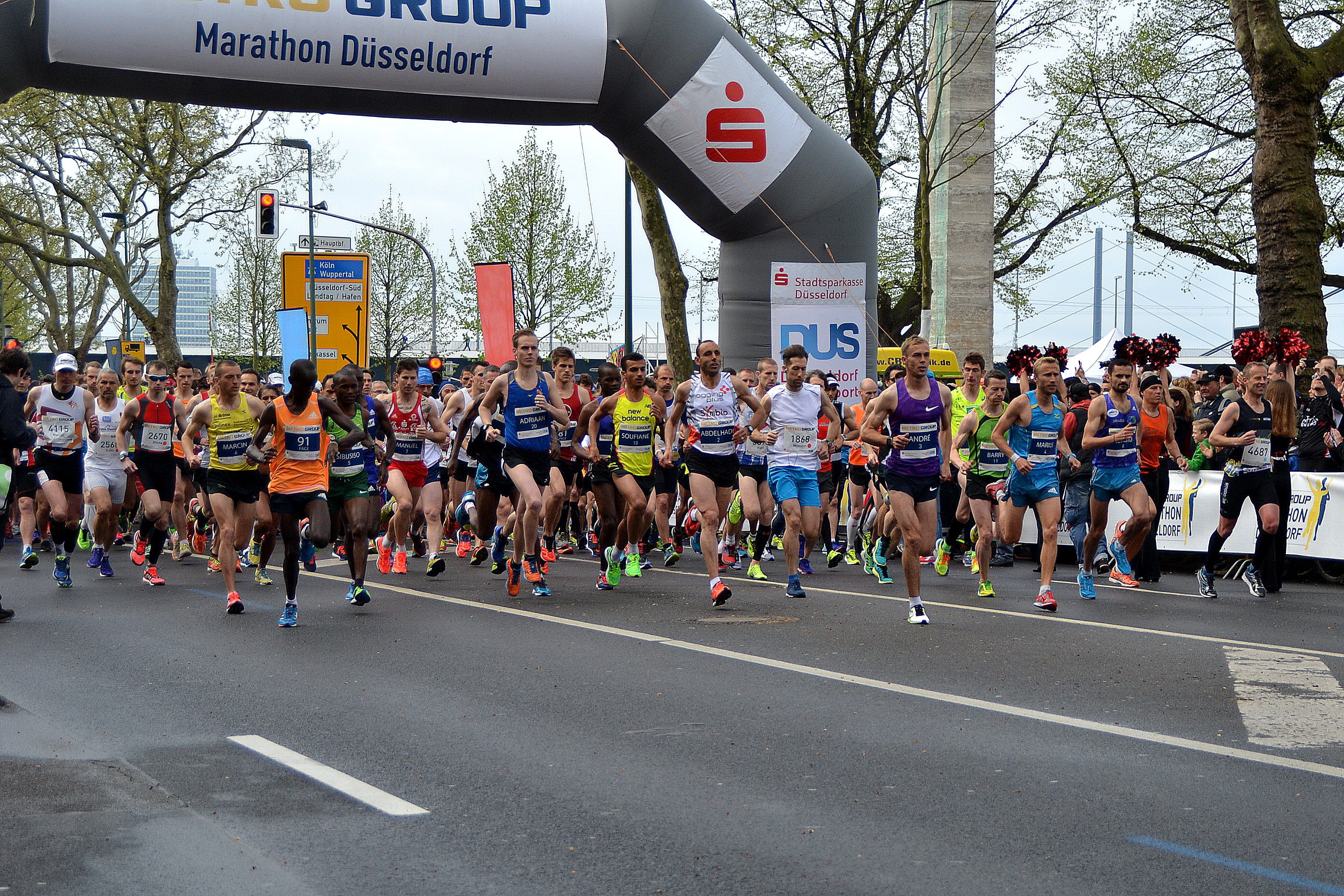
- Marathon start on the banks of the Rhine in 2015
- Date: Late April or early May
- Location: Düsseldorf, Germany
- Event type: Road
- Distance: Marathon
- Primary sponsor: Metro
- Established: 2003 (23 years ago)
- Course records: Men's: 2:07:48 (2013) (Ethiopia) Dereje Debele; Women's: 2:25:25 (2018) (Belarus) Volha Mazuronak
- Website: Düsseldorf Marathon
- Participants: 2,496 (2019); ~14,000 (all races) (2011); 2,987 finishers (2010)

The Düsseldorf Marathon is an annual road marathon in Düsseldorf, Germany in early May, first held in 2003.

The generally flat course runs through parts of the city and alongside the banks of the Rhine. The race day also includes other events, such as a marathon road relay, and over 10,000 people participate annually.

The race is a member of the Association of International Marathons and Distance Races (AIMS) and the German Road Races group. It is sponsored by Metro Group, a large international retailer based in the same city.

== History ==
Organised by Jan-Henning Winschermann (via rhein-marathon düsseldorf e.V.), the race was first held in 2003.

The men's course record was set at the 2013 race, when Dereje Debele won with a time of 2:07:48 hours, while the women's course record was set by Agnes Jeruto Barsosio in 2012, with a time of 2:25:49.

The 2020 edition of the race was cancelled due to the coronavirus pandemic, with entries automatically transferred to 2021 and registrants given the option of obtaining a refund. Similarly, the 2021 edition of the race was postponed to 2022 due to the pandemic. (Note: It had initially been postponed to 24 October before being postponed to 2022.)

== Course ==
External image
- Course map of full marathon in 2019

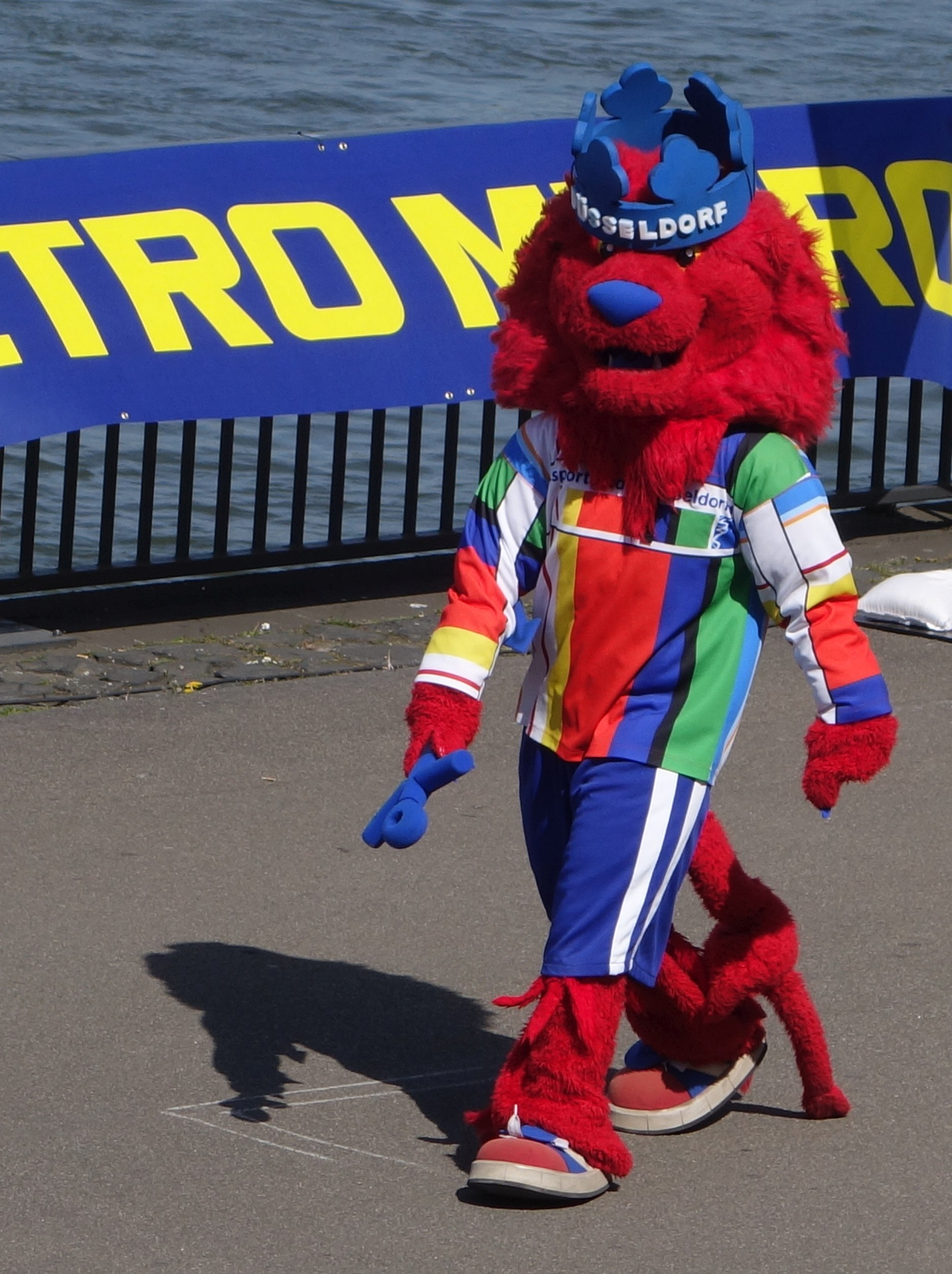
Düsseldorf mascot Tosi sporting athleticwear in 2017

The marathon course lies entirely within the city, and is largely flat except for four bridge crossings.

Beginning in Pempelfort on the east bank of the Rhine, just north of the Oberkassel Bridge, the course runs north through Golzheim, Stockum, and Derendorf before returning to Pempelfort to cross the Rhine via the Oberkassel Bridge after about 13 km (8 mi). Runners then spend about 10 km (6 mi) in Oberkassel, Lörick, and Niederkassel before heading back east across the bridge.

The marathon then runs along the border of Altstadt and makes a small loop in Stadtmitte before heading eastward into Düsseltal. The course then runs roughly southwest back through Stadtmitte and then into Friedrichstadt and Unterbilk. Runners then head northeast into Carlstadt before finishing on the riverbank about 1 km (0.6 mi) south of the start.

== Winners ==
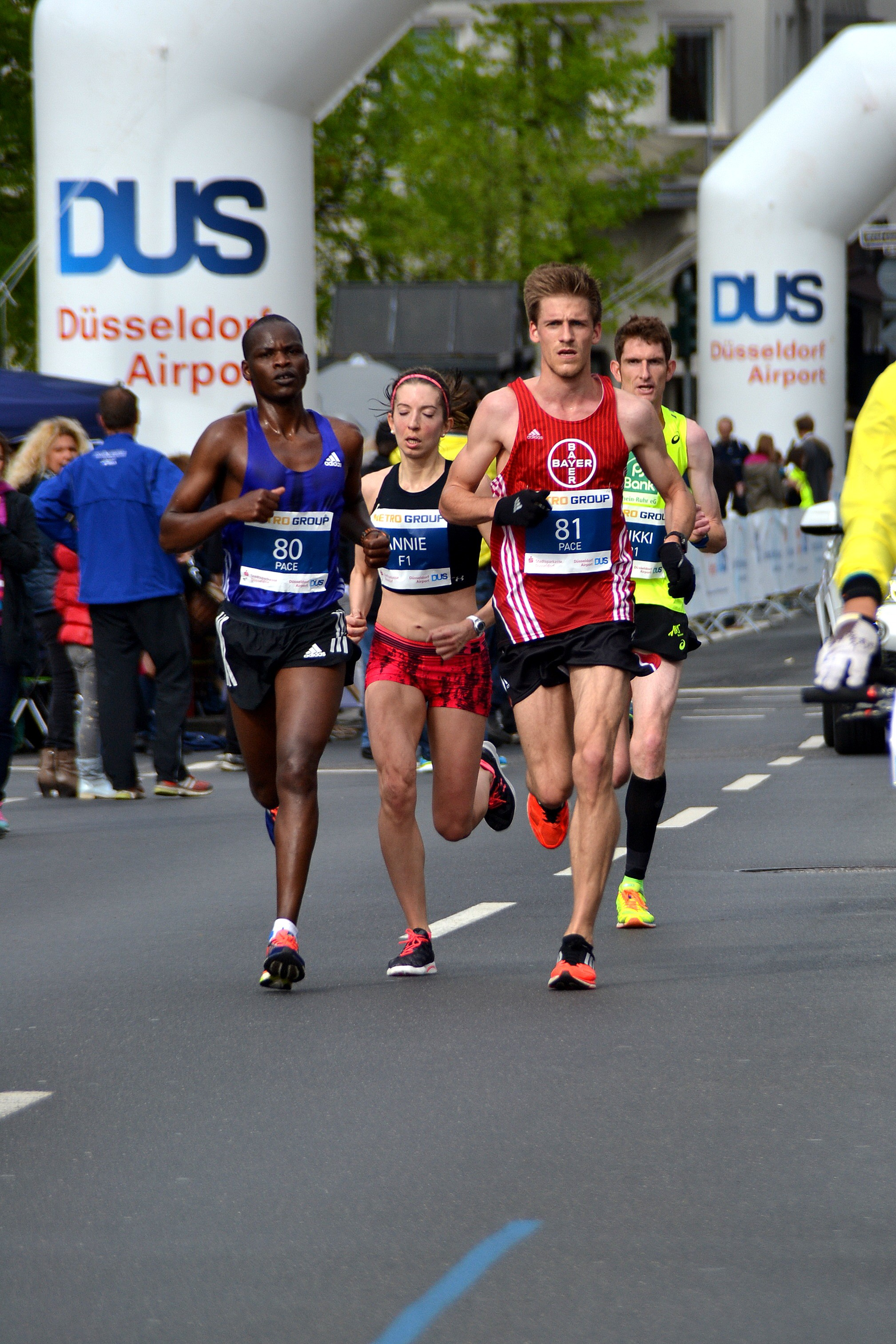
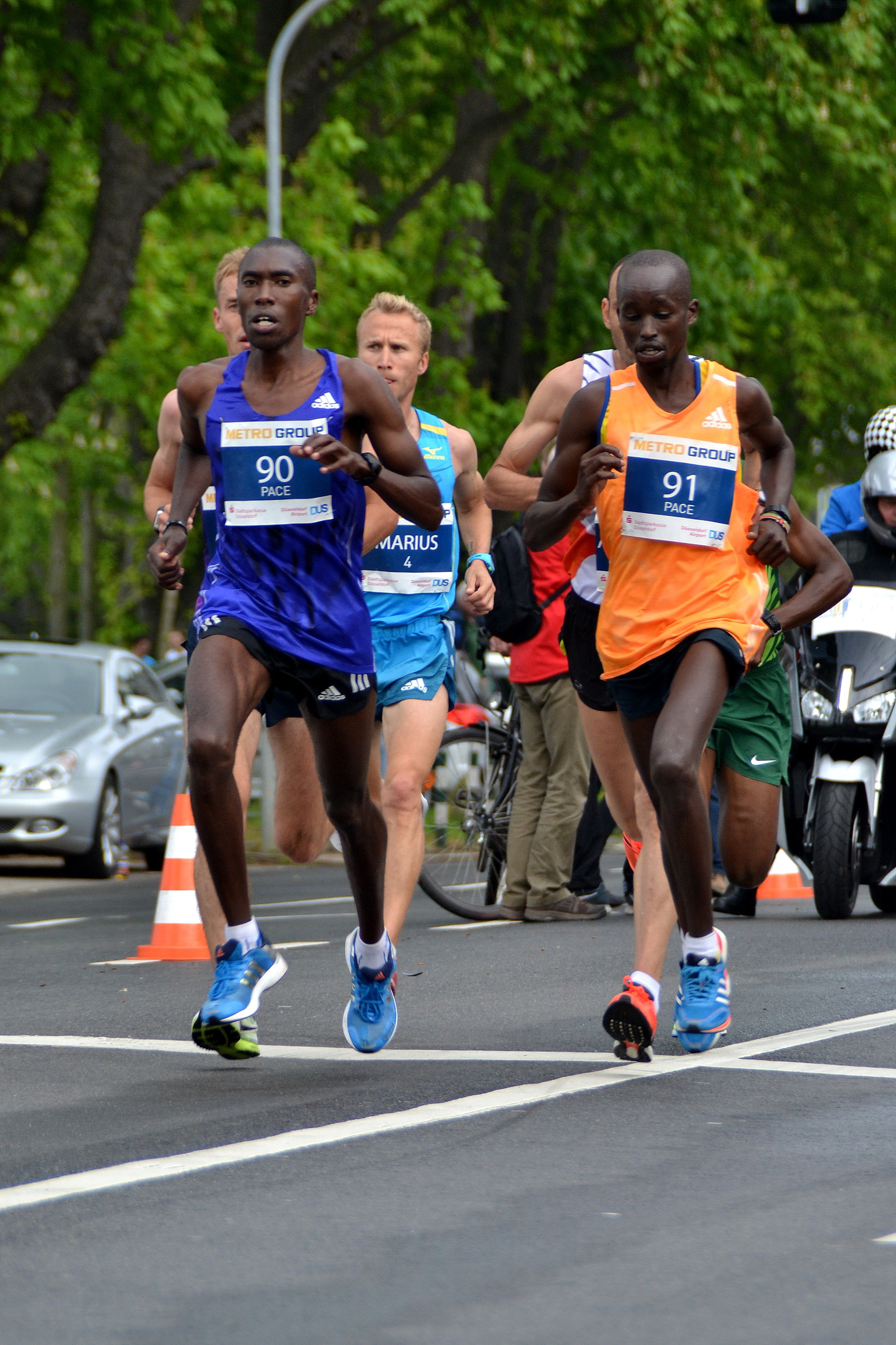
2015 winners Annie Bersagel (left, F1) and Marius Ionescu (right, 4) during the marathon, both behind two pacers

Kenya has been the most successful nationality in the men's race. The women's race has seen mostly Germans top the podium.

Key: Course record (in bold)

Ed.	Year	Men's winner	Time	Women's winner	Time	Rf.
1	2003	Gideon Koech (KEN)	2:20:45	Joyce Kandie (KEN)	2:55:44	
2	2004	Carsten Eich (GER)	2:14:06	Dorota Ustianowska (POL)	2:39:41	
3	2005	Alan Wendell Silva (BRA)	2:17:19	Luminita Zaituc (GER)	2:26:44	
4	2006	Julius Rop (KEN)	2:15:56	Luminita Zaituc (GER)	2:34:53	
5	2007	Bellor Yator (KEN) (Note: The 2007 winner, Kenyan Bellor Minigwo Yator, repeated as winner in 2008 under his adopted Qatari name "Yaser Belal Mansour".)	2:09:47	Luminita Zaituc (GER)	2:29:37	
6	2008	Yaser Mansour (QAT)	2:11:15	Melanie Kraus (GER)	2:33:36	
7	2009	David Langat (KEN)	2:10:46	Susanne Hahn (GER)	2:29:26	
8	2010	Iaroslav Mușinschi (MDA)	2:08:32 NR	Natalya Volgina (RUS)	2:30:47	
9	2011	Nahashon Kimaiyo (KEN)	2:10:54	Merima Mohammed (ETH)	2:28:15	
10	2012	Seboka Dibaba (ETH)	2:08:27	Agnes Barsosio (KEN)	2:25:49	
11	2013	Dereje Debele (ETH)	**2:07:48**	Melkam Gizaw (ETH)	2:26:24	
12	2014	Gilbert Yegon (KEN)	2:08:07	Annie Bersagel (USA)	2:28:59	
13	2015	Marius Ionescu (ROM)	2:13:19	Annie Bersagel (USA)	2:28:28	
14	2016	Japhet Kosgei (KEN)	2:10:46	Zsófia Erdélyi (HUN)	2:35:37	
15	2017	Robert Chemonges (UGA)	2:10:31	Doroteia Peixoto (POR)	2:32:00	
16	2018	Gilbert Yegon (KEN)	2:13:55	Volha Mazuronak (BLR)	2:25:25	
17	2019	Tom Gröschel (GER)	2:13:49	Anja Scherl (GER)	2:32:56	
—	2020	cancelled due to coronavirus pandemic				
—	2021	postponed due to coronavirus pandemic				
—	2022	postponed				
—	2023, 2024	not held				
18	2025	Alex Maier (USA)	2:08:33	Leah Cheruto (KEN)	**2:25:23**	
