= Schadowstraße =

German shopping spree

Coordinates: 51°13′34″N 6°46′55″E

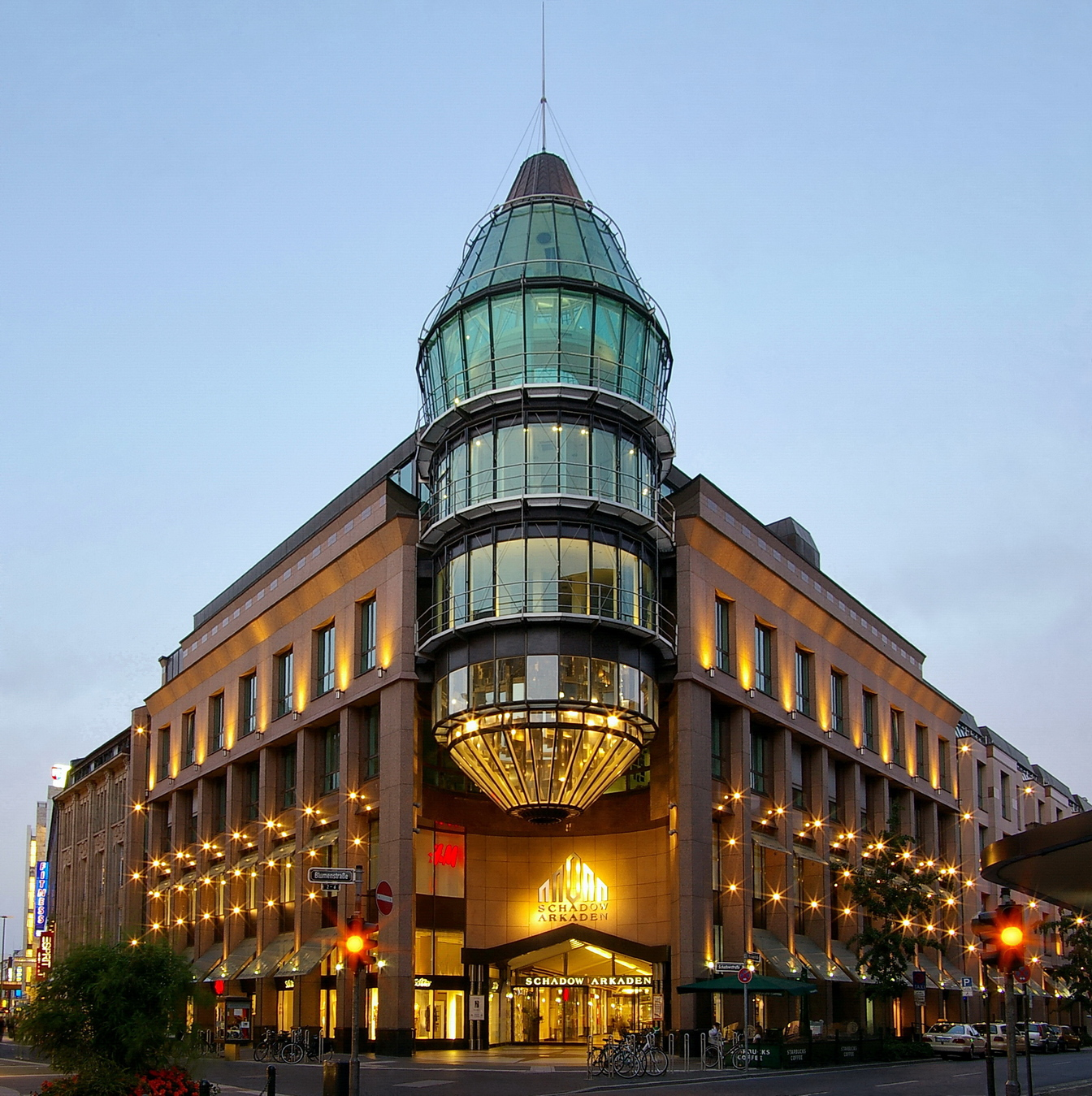
Schadow Arkaden shopping mall, as seen from Königsallee

Schadowstraße is a shopping street in Düsseldorf, Germany, located in the districts of Stadtmitte and Pempelfort. The street cuts through downtown Düsseldorf, starting at Königsallee, passing the Tausendfüßler and reaching up to Berliner Allee. Schadowstraße is named after the German Romantic painter Wilhelm von Schadow.

The Western section towards Königsallee is a pedestrian zone and has some landmark buildings, such as the Schadow Arkaden, a shopping mall designed by German architect Walter Brune in 1994, and the Peek & Cloppenburg flagship store, designed by American architect Richard Meier in 2001. A new underground station named "Schadowstraße" is currently under construction at the junction with Berliner Allee and scheduled to open in 2014. It is one of the most frequented shopping streets in Düsseldorf.

== See also ==
- District 1, Düsseldorf
- List of leading shopping streets and districts by city
