= Chapel of St. Roch, Düsseldorf =

Demolished chapel in Düsseldorf, Germany

Coordinates: 51°13′54″N 6°47′20″E

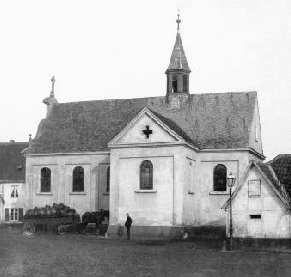
Chapel of St. Roch circa 1896

The Chapel of St. Roch in Düsseldorf, Germany, was a chapel that existed from 1667 to 1897.

== History ==
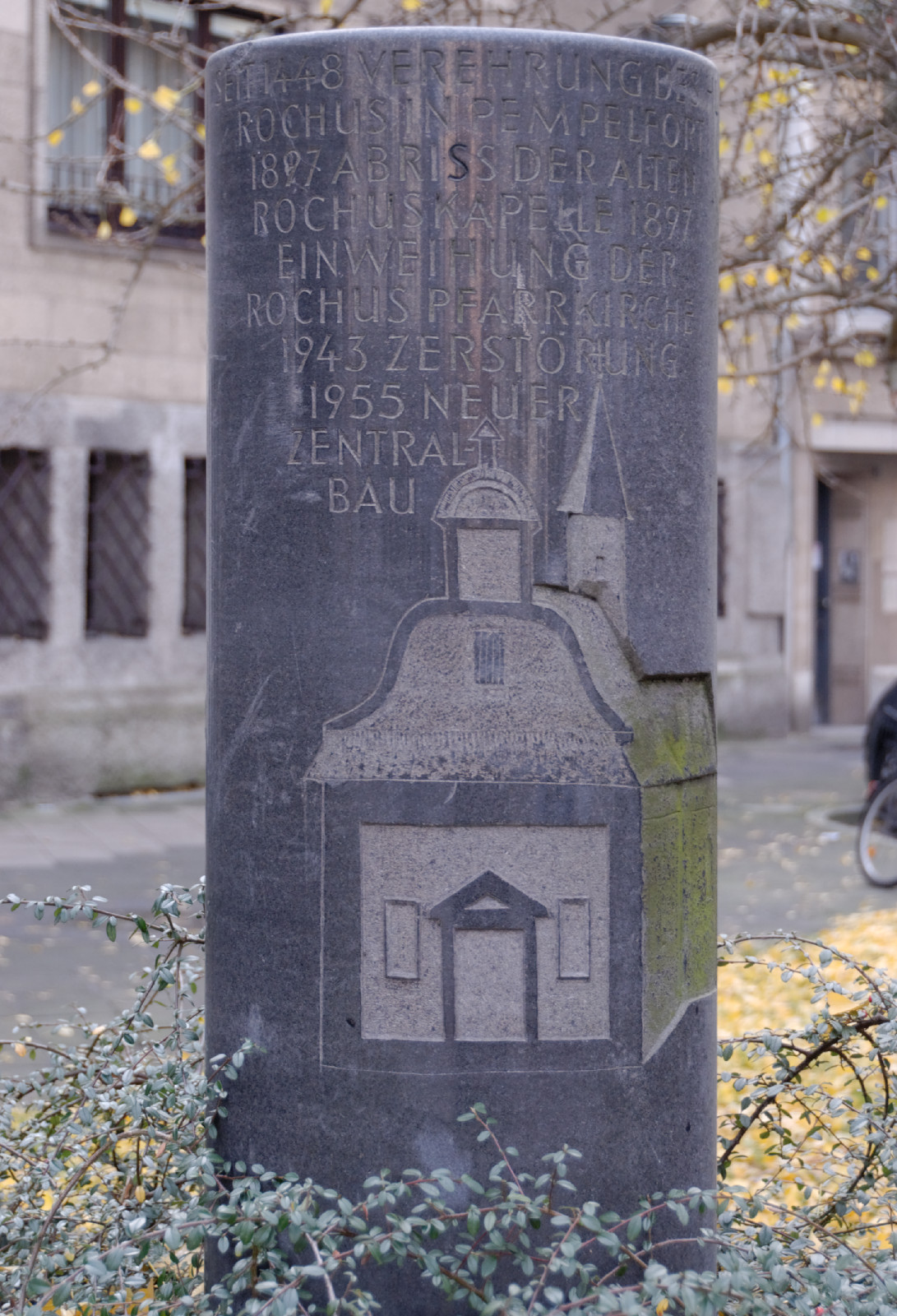
Memorial column for the Chapel of St. Roch

In 1448, the veneration of St. Roch in Pempelfort was documented for the first time. In 1667, the chapel was built to mark the end of a plague epidemic. It was a single-nave building. The ground plan was cruciform and the sacred space was vaulted on the inside. An eight-sided ridge turret rose above the crossing. After the Church of St. Roch was completed in 1897, the chapel was demolished.
