= Düsseldorf-Stadtmitte =

Quarter of Düsseldorf

Coordinates: 51°13′28″N 6°47′13″E

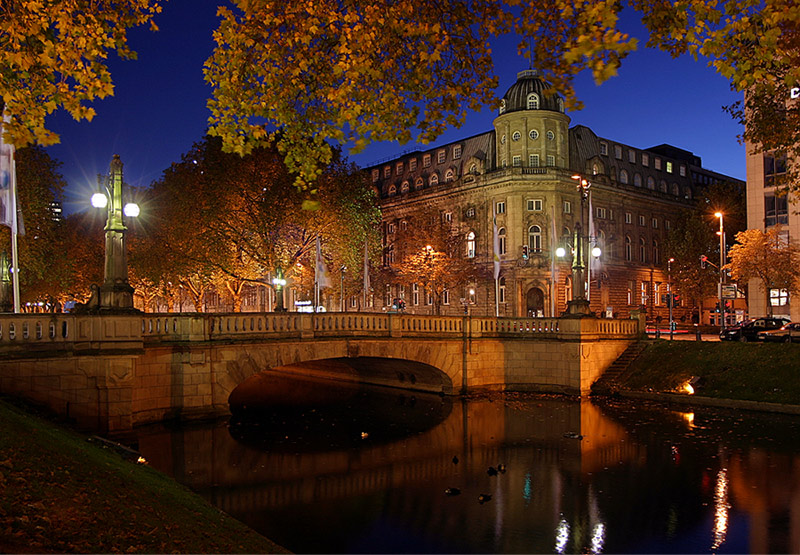
View of Königsallee

Map of Düsseldorf, showing Stadtmitte (in red) within Borough 1 (in pink)

Stadtmitte (German pronunciation: [ˈʃtatˌmɪtə], City Centre) is an urban quarter in the central Borough 1 of Düsseldorf, Germany. Stadtmitte borders with Carlstadt, Pempelfort, Oberbilk and the old town of Düsseldorf: Düsseldorf-Altstadt. Stadtmitte has an area of 1.77 km^{2} (0.68 sq mi), and 14,654 inhabitants (2020).

== List of attractions ==
In the Stadtmitte there are:

- Düsseldorf Hauptbahnhof, the Main Station for Düsseldorf
- the Schadowstraße - one of the highest turnover shopping streets in Europe
- the greatest theatre of Düsseldorf (Schauspielhaus)
- the stock exchange of Düsseldorf
- WestLB, the central bank of North Rhine-Westphalia (Landeszentralbank)
- Thyssen-Haus (Dreischeibenhaus)
- the Königsallee, short Kö, a prominent shopping street.
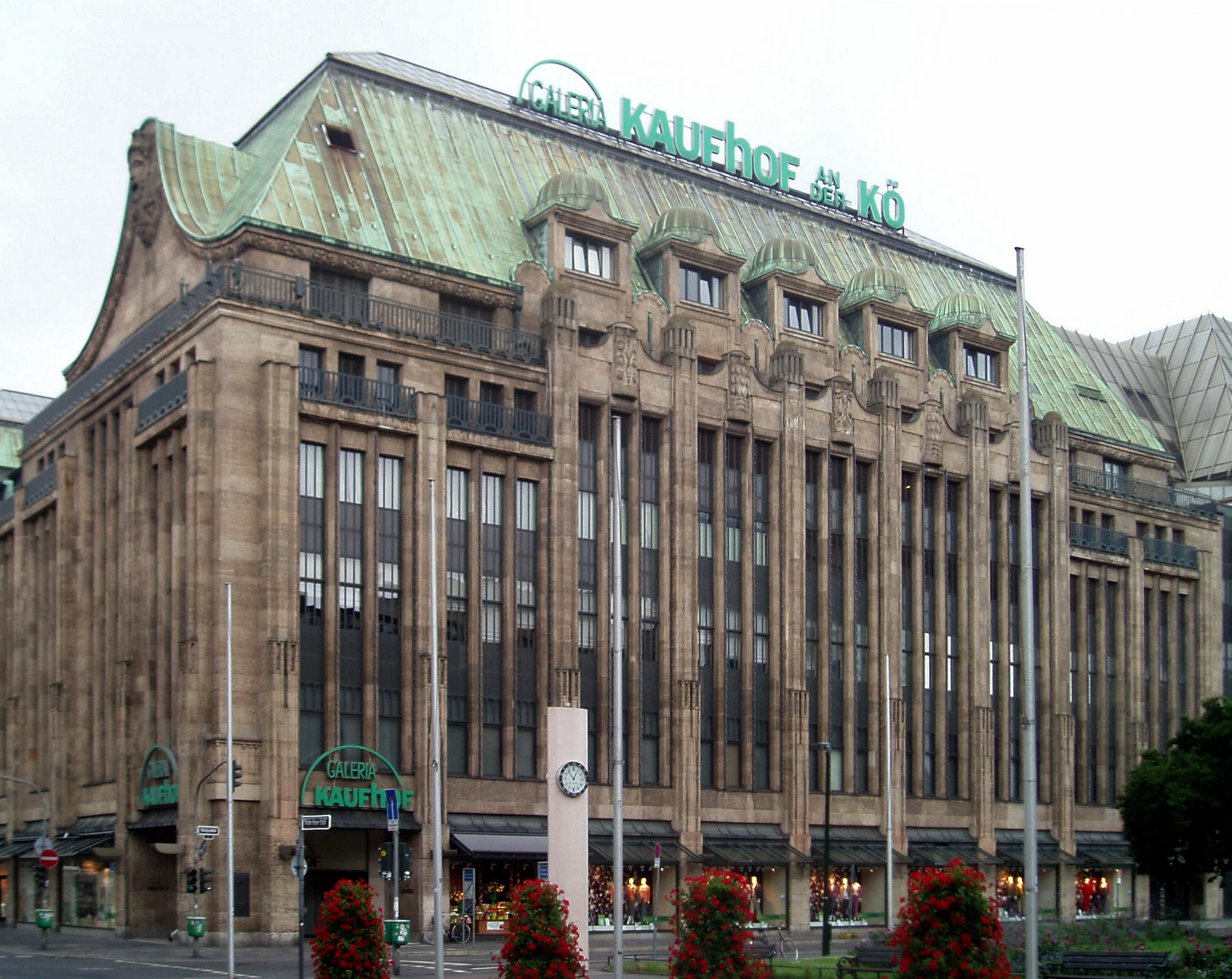
Department store on Königsallee

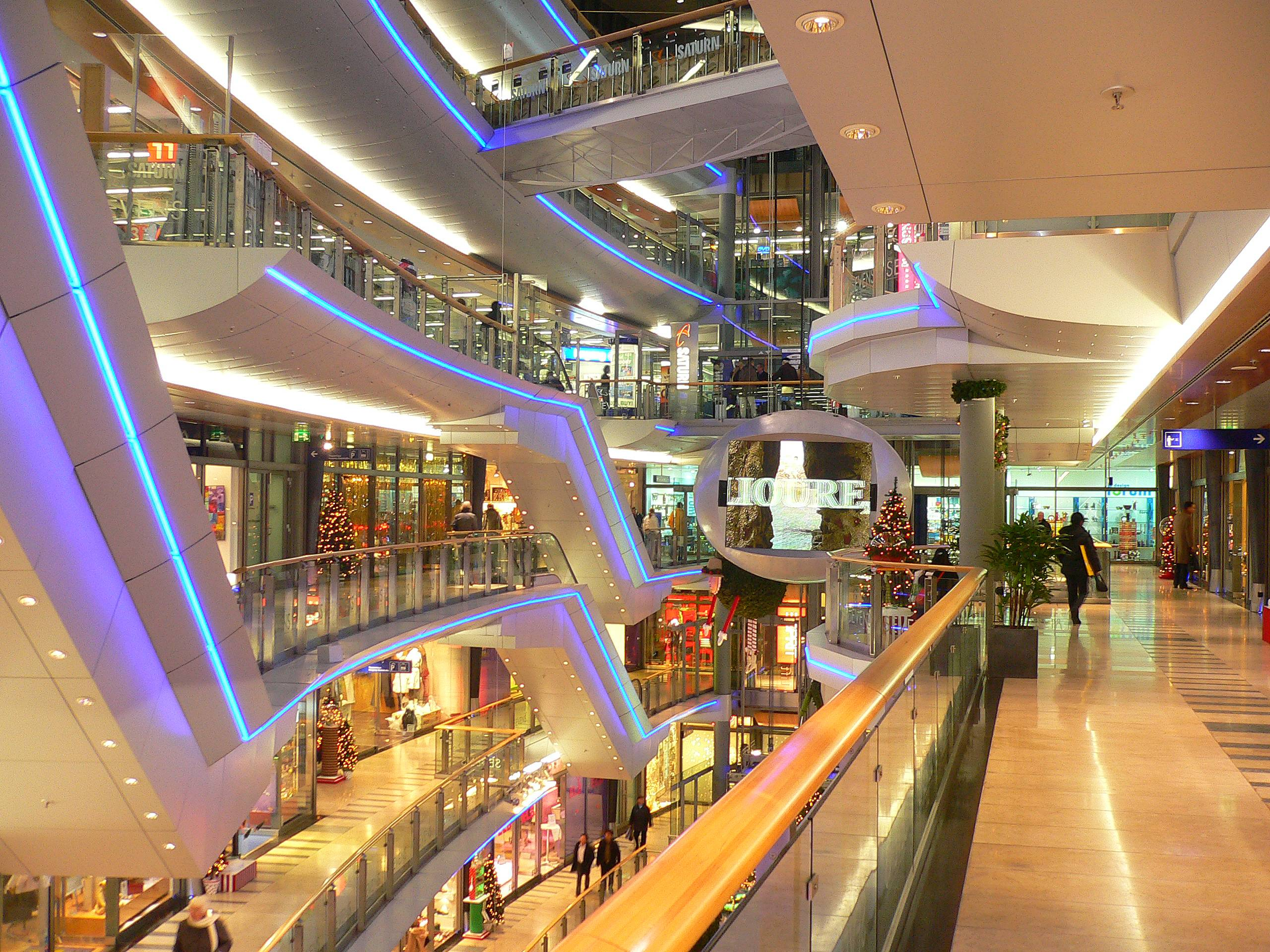
"Sevens" shopping arcade

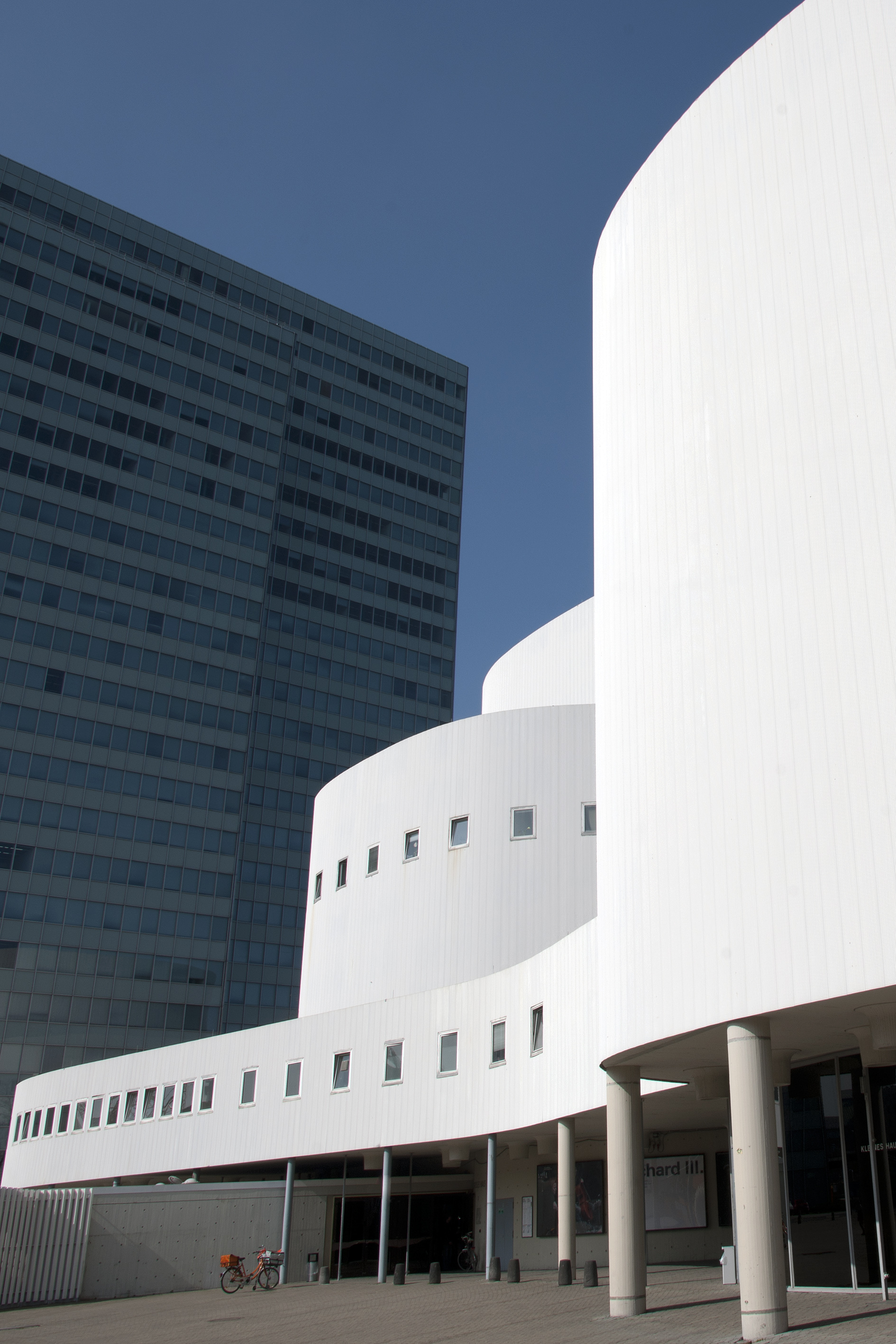
Schauspielhaus

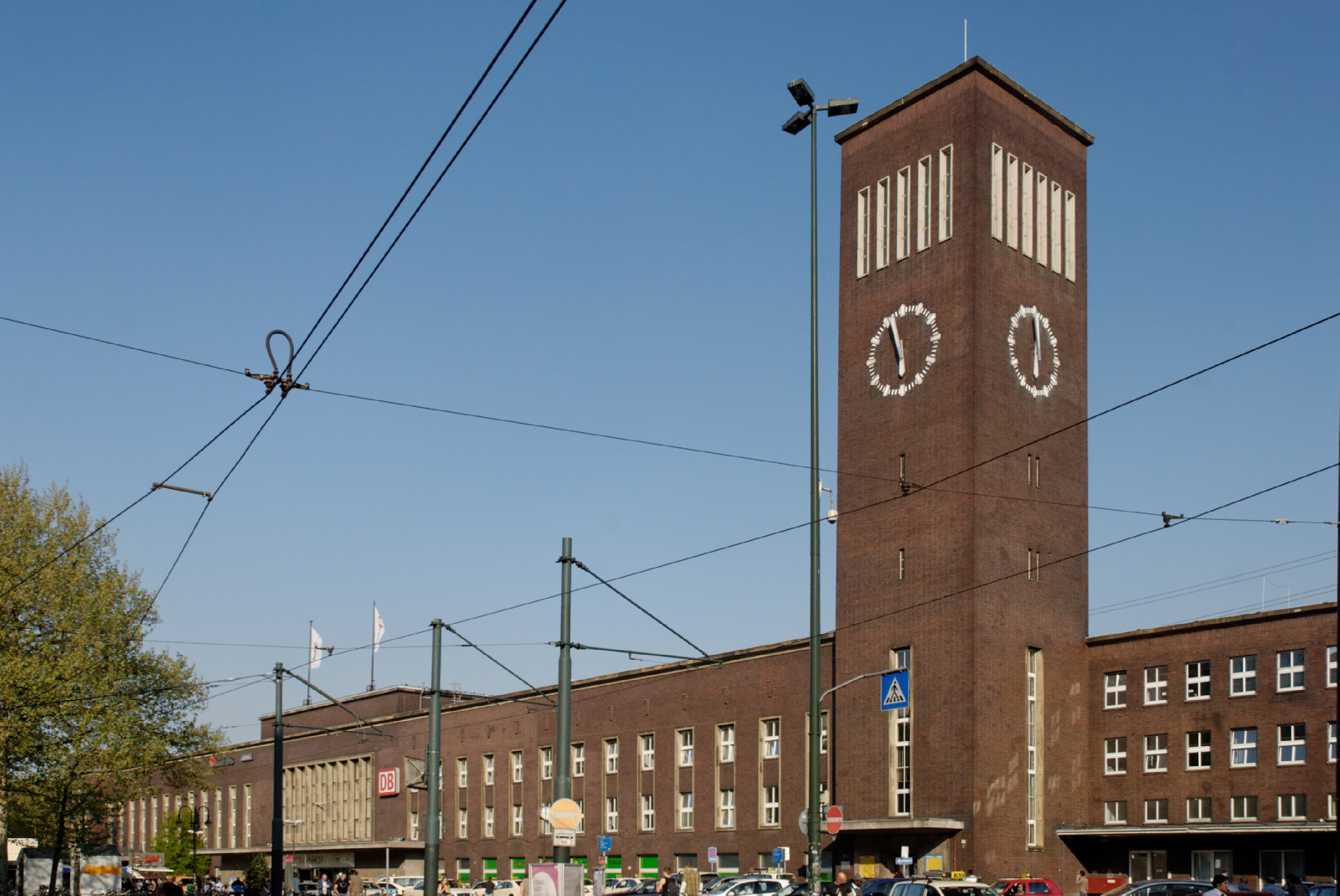
Düsseldorf Hbf (central station)

== Economy ==
All Nippon Airways has its Düsseldorf Sales Office in Stadtmitte.
