= Carlstadt =

Carlstadt may refer to:

- Carlstadt, New Jersey
- Carlstadt, a borough of Düsseldorf
- a German name for Karlovac in Croatia
- Andreas Carlstadt (1486–1541), a Protestant theologian

== See also ==
- Karlstadt (disambiguation)
