= Annie Bersagel =

American long-distance runner and lawyer

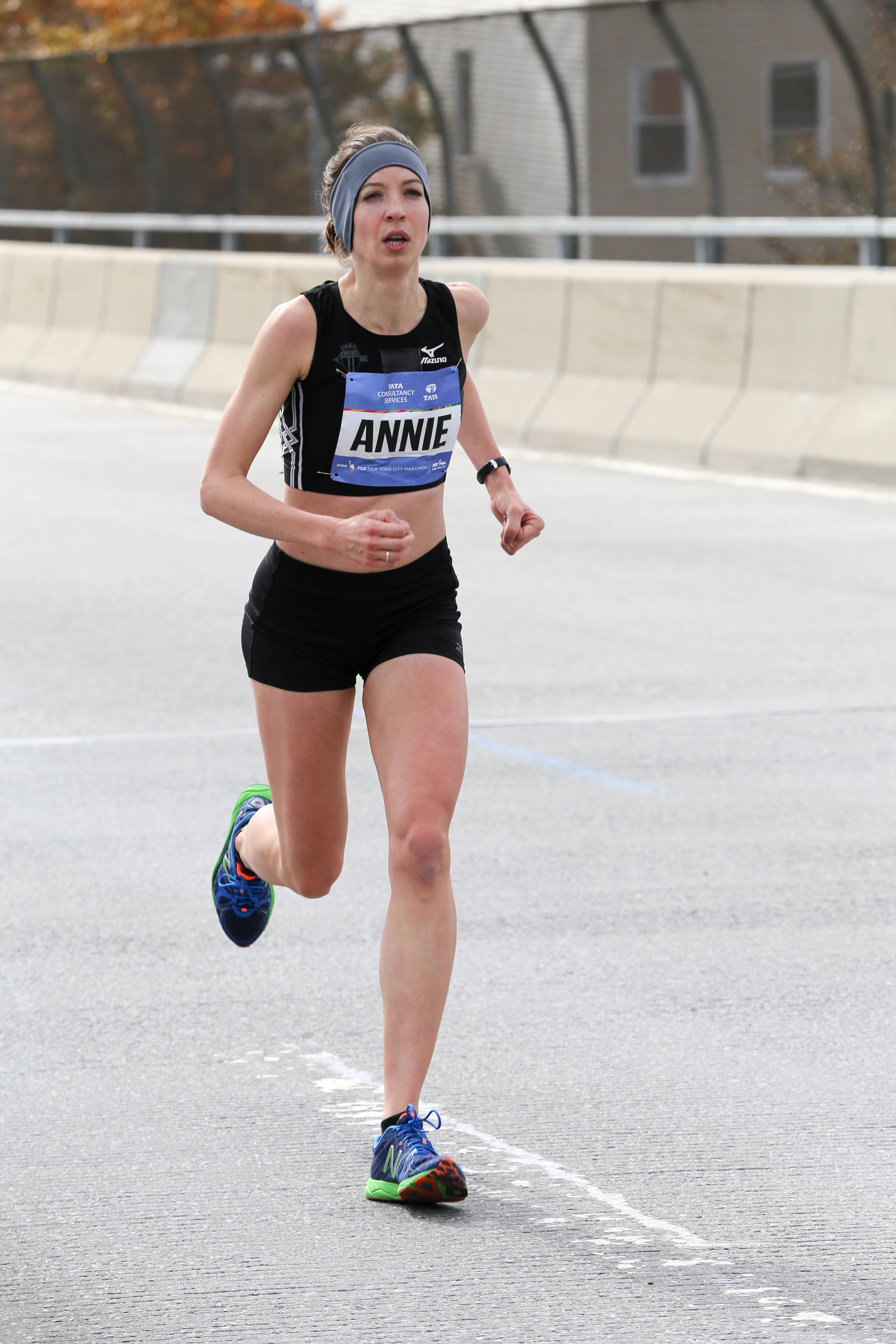

Personal information
- Nickname: Annie Bersagel
- Nationality: American
- Born: March 30, 1983 (age 43) West Union, Iowa
- Height: 5 ft 6 in (168 cm)

Sport
- Sport: Track; Marathon runner Mountain running
- Event(s): 5000 meters, 10,000 meters, Marathon
- College team: Wake Forest University; Stanford Law School
- Turned pro: 2005

Achievements and titles
- Personal best(s): 3000 metres: 9:10.56; 10,000 metres: 32:56; Half marathon: 1:10:10; Marathon:2:28:29

Anne Golden Bersagel (born March 30, 1983) is an American long-distance runner.

== Early life ==
Bersagel attended Greeley Central High School in Greeley, Colorado.

== Wake Forest ==
Bersagel attended Wake Forest University in North Carolina. While there, she was a three-time All-American in cross country, a two-time Academic All-American, a two-time Wake Forest University scholar-athlete of the year, five-time track & field All-American, a two-time Atlantic Coast Conference (ACC) champion in the outdoor 10,000 meters, and was the 2005 ACC champion in the indoor 5000 meters.

Bersagel was the 2006 NCAA Woman of the Year Award winner, in recognition of excellence in academics, athletics, community service and leadership, as well as the 2006 Walter Byers Award winner as the top National Collegiate Athletic Association female scholar-athlete.

Bersagel named to Wake Forest 2015 Hall of Fame Class.

== Elite running ==
After graduating with honors as an economics and politics double major in December 2005, Bersagel began training with Team USA Minnesota. She won the USA Half-Marathon champions held in Kansas City, Missouri on June 3, 2006, with a time of 1 hour 14 minutes 36 seconds.

Bersagel placed 10th in the 2006 USA Cross Country Championships 8 km. In May 2007, she left Team USA Minnesota and the University of Minnesota. Bersagel earned a Fulbright Scholarship to pursue a graduate degree in peace and conflict studies at the University of Oslo. Bersagel has interned at the U.S. Embassy in Oslo, Norway. She was also awarded an NCAA postgraduate scholarship.

Bersagel graduated from Stanford Law School in June 2012.

Bersagel did not enter the Olympic Trials in 2008.

== World stage ==
Bersagel represented the United States during the 2011 Pan American Games for the 10,000m in Guadalajara, Mexico, with a fourth-place finish as the top American in 35:23.31.

Bersagel ran the second-fastest half marathon for a US athlete in 2014 at IAAF World Half Marathon Championships in 70:10.

On April 25, 2015, Bersagel won the Düsseldorf Marathon in a personal best of 2:28:29.

Bersagel was the 4th woman at Loon Mountain race / 2018 US Mountain running Championship and earned a spot on the Team USA Mountain running on July 8. The 2018 Loon Mountain race served as the NACAC Mountain Running Championship.
