= Borough 1 (Düsseldorf) =

Stadtbezirk 1
- Borough of Düsseldorf
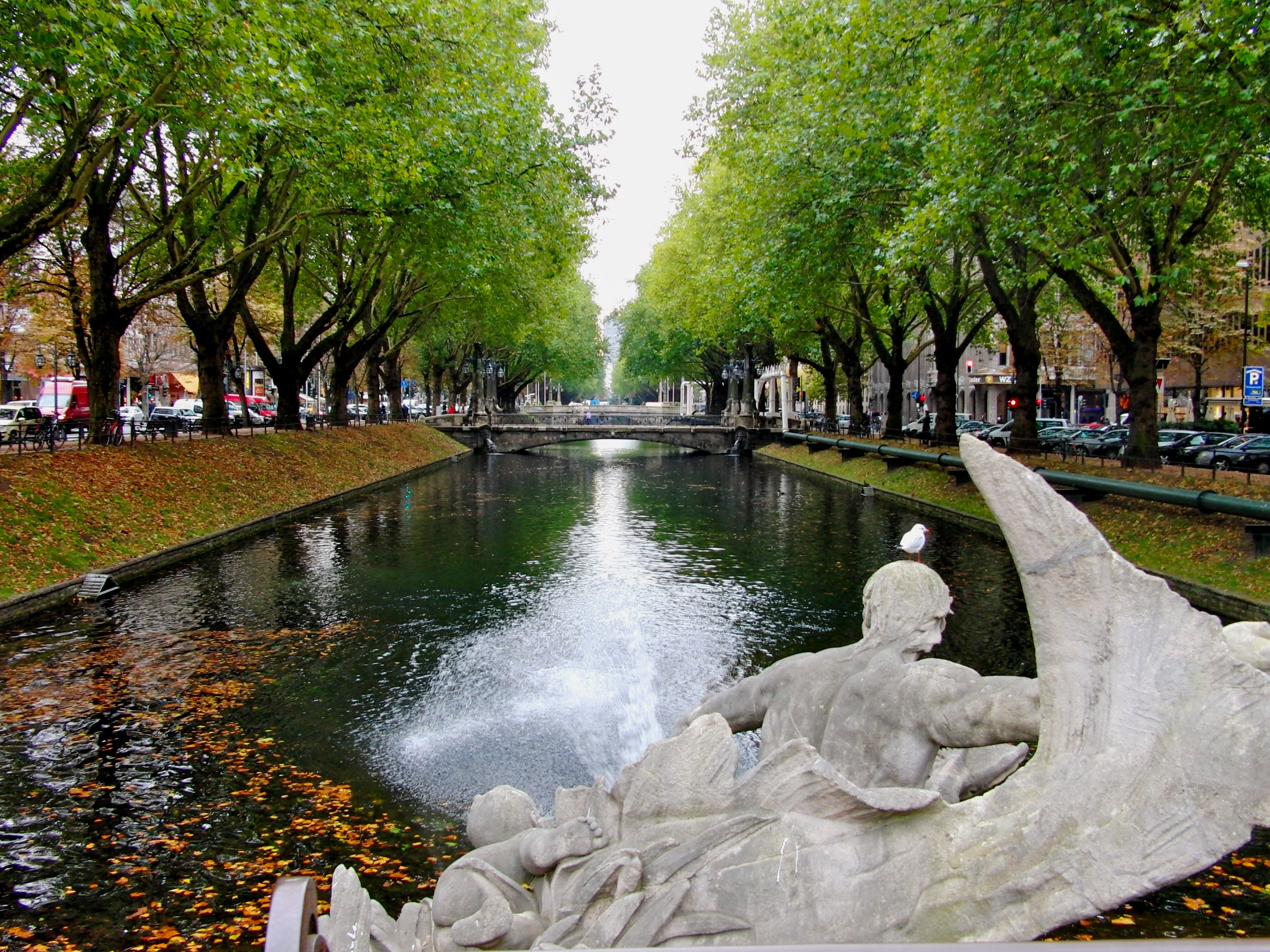
- Triton-Fountain at Königsallee, Stadtmitte

- Location of Stadtbezirk 1 within Düsseldorf
- Interactive map of Stadtbezirk 1
- Location within Germany Location within North Rhine-Westphalia
- Coordinates: 51°13′N 6°46′E
- Country: Germany
- State: North Rhine-Westphalia
- District: Urban district
- City: Düsseldorf
- Subdivisions: 6 quarters

Government
  - Mayor: Annette Klinke (Greens)

Area
  - Total: 11.31 km^{2} (4.37 sq mi)

Population (2020-12-31)
  - Total: 85,936
  - Density: 7,598/km^{2} (19,680/sq mi)
- Time zone: UTC+01:00 (CET)
  - Summer (DST): UTC+02:00 (CEST)

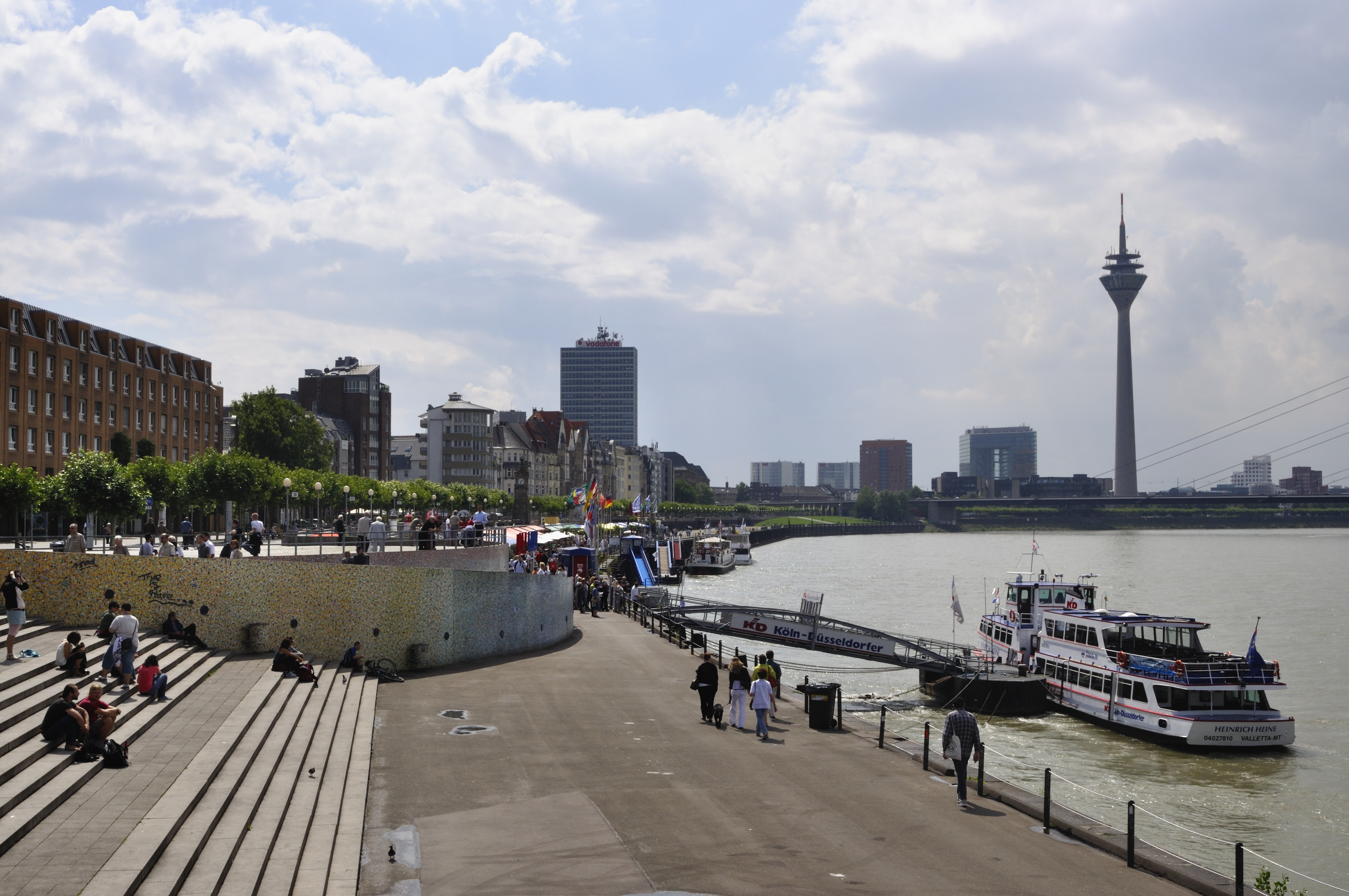
Rheinufer Promenade along the River Rhine. Köln-Düsseldorfer (KD) offer river cruises to Cologne.

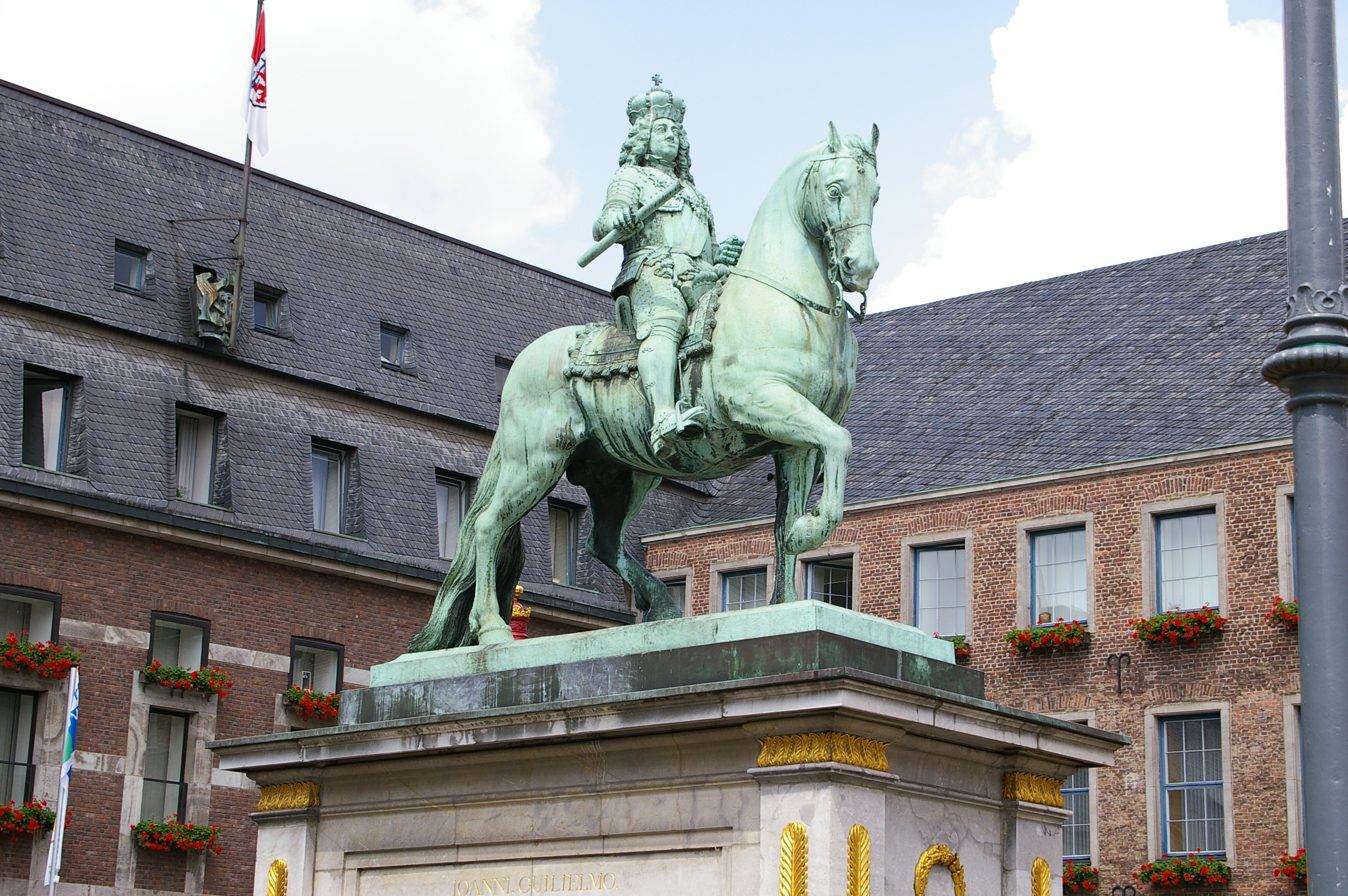
Equestrian statue of Duke Johann Wilhelm (1658 - 1716) at Marktplatz

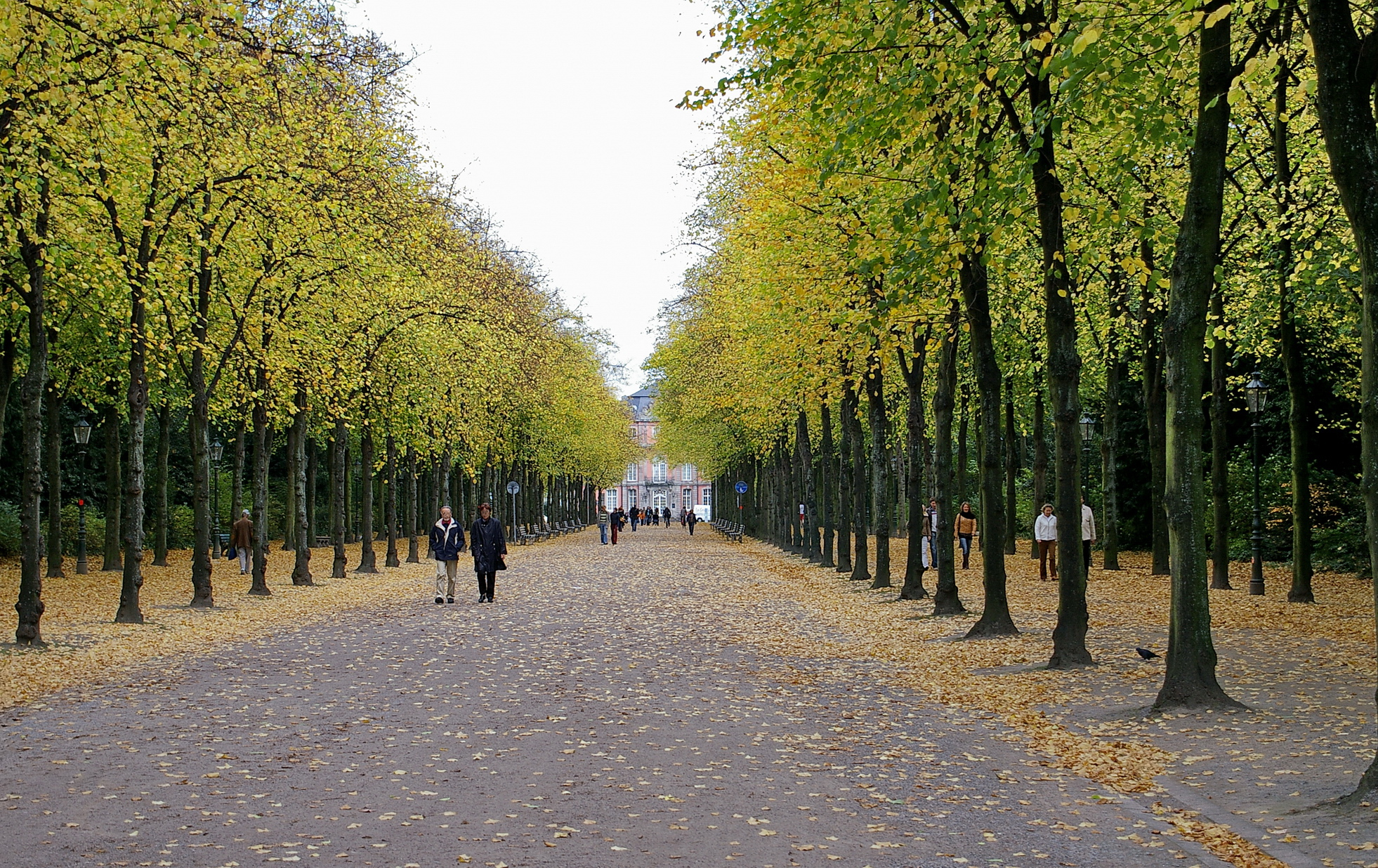
Hofgarten during autumn of 2006

Borough 1 (German: Stadtbezirk 1) is the central borough of Düsseldorf, the state capital of North Rhine-Westphalia, Germany and the city's commercial and cultural center. The borough covers an area of 11.31 square kilometres and (as of December 2020) has about 86,000 inhabitants.

Despite being one of Düsseldorf's smallest boroughs by area, Stadtbezirk 1 includes several distinct quarters: the city's Medieval Altstadt is known as an entertainment district with plenty of Altbier pubs and bars, while the adjacent Baroque-style Carlstadt has a very Bohemian character. Stadtmitte is the city's shopping and central business district, extending into the three Gründerzeit quarters of Pempelfort, Derendorf and Golzheim - the latter three also being popular as both business locations and residential areas. The entire borough has a high density of institutions and enterprises associated with the arts and culture in general.

The borough shares borders (clockwise from north) with Düsseldorf boroughs 5, 6, 2, 3 and - over the Rhine - Borough 4.

== Subdivisions ==
Borough 1 is made up of six Stadtteile (city parts):

#	City part	Population (2020)	Area (km²)	Pop. per km²
011	Altstadt	2,429	0.477	5,398
012	Carlstadt	2,259	0.451	5,020
013	Stadtmitte	14,654	1.77	8,279
014	Pempelfort	33,137	2.70	12,228
015	Derendorf	20,584	3.36	6,072
016	Golzheim	12,873	2.56	5,068

== Places of interest ==
=== Landmarks ===
- Düsseldorf Stock Exchange
- Königsallee
- Kunstakademie
- Marktplatz
- Schlossturm
- Collegiate Church of St Lambertus
- New Synagogue
- Drei-Scheiben-Haus
- Johannes-Church

=== Arts, Culture and Entertainment ===
- Deutsche Oper am Rhein
- Düsseldorfer Schauspielhaus
- Filmmuseum
- Forum NRW
- Hetjens Museum (German museum of ceramics)
- Institut Français Düsseldorf
- Kom(m)ödchen (Political cabaret)
- Kunstsammlung Nordrhein-Westfalen - K20 (Grabbeplatz) and K21 (Ständehaus)
- Kunsthalle Düsseldorf
- Marionettentheater
- Museum Kunst Palast
- Stadtmuseum
- Tanzhaus NRW (theatre for dance)
- Tonhalle Düsseldorf (concert hall for classical music, jazz, pop, cabaret)

=== Shopping ===
- Kö Gallerie
- Schadow-Arkaden
- Sevens Königsallee

=== Parks and open spaces ===
- Hofgarten
- Königsallee
- Rheinpark
- Rheinuferpromenade

== Transportation ==
As the business center of Düsseldorf, Borough 1 is well served by numerous railway stations and highway. Largest train station is Düsseldorf Hauptbahnhof, other stations include Düsseldorf Wehrhahn and a dense net of both Düsseldorf Stadtbahn underground- and Rheinbahn tram-stations. The Rheinufertunnel is part of Bundesstraße 1 and runs some 2 km along the right Rhine side, diverting car traffic away from the streets. Two large bridges cross the river into the left-Rhenish quarter of Oberkassel.

=== Rhine bridges ===
- B 7 Theodor-Heuss-Brücke
- Oberkasseler Brücke

== Economy ==
All Nippon Airways has its Düsseldorf Sales Office in Stadtmitte, Borough 1.

== See also ==
- Boroughs of Düsseldorf
