= Karlstadt =

Karlstadt may refer to:

- Karlstadt, Germany
- Karlovac, Croatia (German name Karlstadt)
- Karlstad, Sweden
- Karlstad, Minnesota

== People with the surname ==
- Andreas Karlstadt (1486–1541), German Protestant theologian and reformer
- Liesl Karlstadt (1892-1960), German actress

== See also ==
- Carlstadt (disambiguation)
- Kallstadt, Germany
