= Walter Brune =

German architect (1926–2021)

Walter Brune (14 February 1926 – 5 November 2021) was a German architect, urban planner, and real estate entrepreneur.

== Professional career ==
Brune was born in Bremen. As a young engineering graduate he became independent after three years of practice in the office of Professor Gustav August Munzer in 1950. He first worked for the heavy industry and built in the early 1950s – as a very young architect – the coal mine "Prosper Haniel", as well as several power plants, winding towers, etc.. In the late 1950s, the store-company Karstadt noticed him. For this group he built department stores for 20 years. The highlight was the design and construction of the Karstadt department store head office in Essen. Numerous buildings for commerce, industry and administration for other companies also fell within this period. For two decades, between 1950 and 1970, he developed alongside the major projects country houses for numerous personalities from business and industry (Helmut Horten, Wolf, Bauknecht, etc.) in the bungalow style, which were introduced in the architectural magazines around the world due to their uniqueness. In his period Walter Brune operated one of the busiest architectural offices in the Federal Republic of Germany, with satellite offices in New York, Tehran, Kabul and in the Netherlands. The World Bank commissioned him in partnership with the renowned American architect Marcel Breuer to design large-scale development projects. For the Shah of Persia, he created the design of a new city on the Caspian Sea (Namak Abroud).

== Entrepreneurial activity ==
Walter Brune put earned money repeatedly in real estate. The building development he conducted already in the 1960s, carried out parallel to his architectural practice. His motivation for this activity was always the worry of being able to pay his many skilled employees because of temporary absence of contract or project delays and the worry of losing them with this. His entrepreneurial activity was less professional goal but a logical consequence of his thinking. The result was until today a large real estate company.

== Development of retail architecture ==
Since the early 1980s, he made himself a name in personal union as an architect, developer, consultant and operator of shopping centers built in an urban area. The insight about the negative impacts of large shopping center (which he himself proposed in 1970 RheinRuhrZentrum in Mülheim an der Ruhr) is the reason for him to develop the concept of a "City Gallery", a multifunctional scale retail architecture adapted to the inner-block structures form, which he first implemented at the "Kö-Galerie" in Düsseldorf. The city of Eindhoven entrusted him with the help of "Heuvel Galerie" to revive their former derelict city center. A symbiosis of old existing structures with a new architecture, adapted to the local tradition of building, which includes retail, services, housing and culture in the form of a concert hall, was the result.

== Advocate for the importance of vibrant inner cities ==
In addition to operating as a designer, developer, he operated for years as an urban fighter for the preservation of living downtown areas in the growing inner cities. Last but not least because of the negative impacts of large and non-integrated shopping center, he is an active publicist, inter alia with the book "Angriff auf die City" (Düsseldorf, 2006).

Awards

- 1960: Award of the BDA (Association of German Architects) for the construction of a Feingusswerkes
- 1987: ICSC European Shopping Center Award "Shopping Center of the Year 1986" for the 1986 completed Kö-Galerie
- 1989: Federal Cross of Merit for his inventiveness, his professional dedication and his willingness to corporate responsibility
- 1991: Bouwforum Leonardo da Vinci for the Heuvel Galerie in Eindhoven / The Netherlands and the 1992 ICSC commendation for excellence for the outstanding project of an urban shopping center
- 1994: ICSC European Shopping Center Award for the redesign of the Rhein Ruhr Center Mülheim
- 1995: ICSC European Shopping Center Award 1995 for the Schadow Arcades Düsseldorf as the best European inner-city shopping center
- 2005: urbanicom Prize for his lifetime achievements as an architect, planner, developer, media and cultural ambassador and champion for the city

== Works (selection) ==
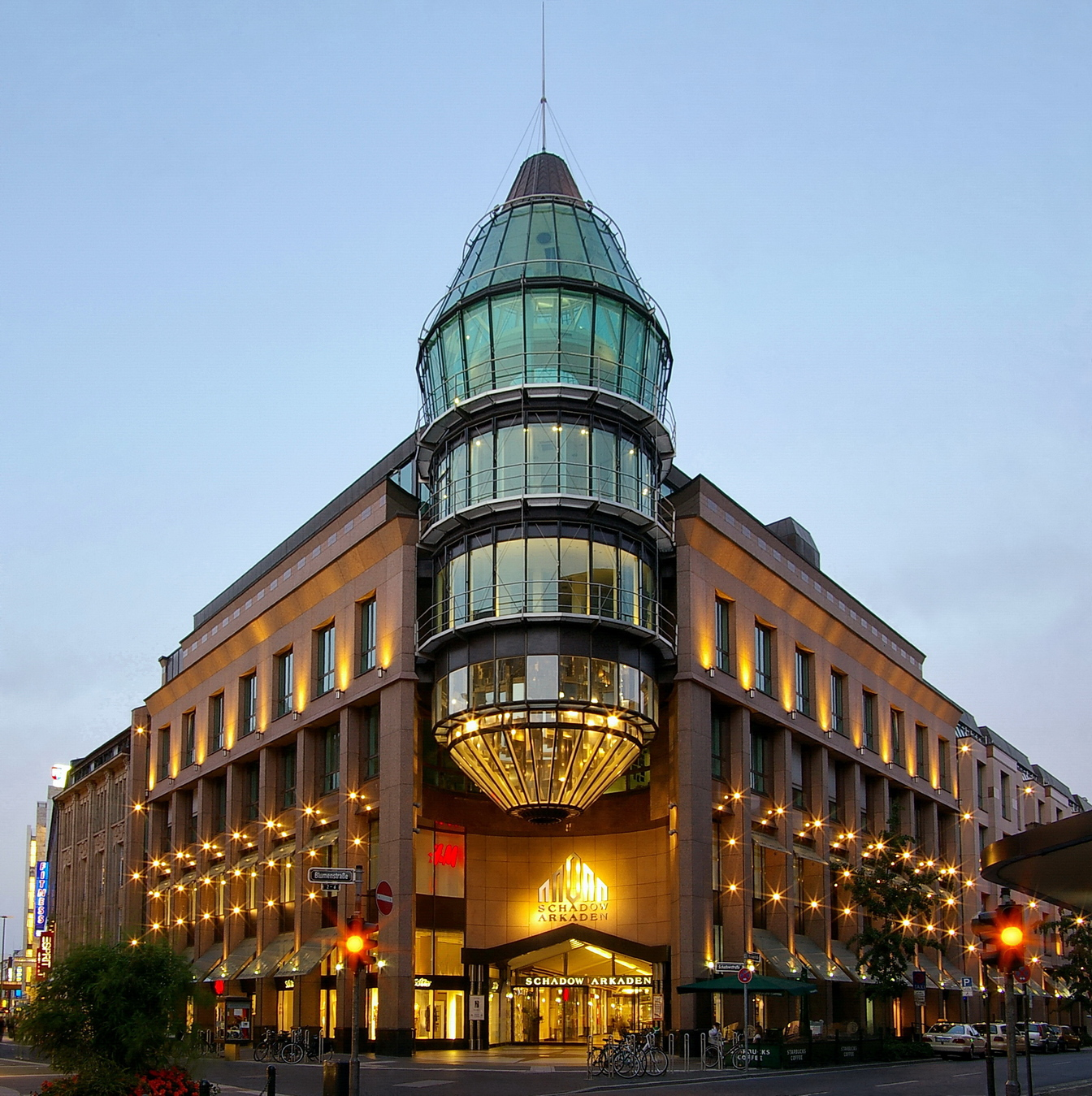
Schadow Arkaden shopping mall, on Schadowstraße, Düsseldorf

- Barbarahof (Residential building), Düsseldorf, 1951
- Zeche Franz Haniel, Bottrop, 1951–55
- House Horten, Düsseldorf, 1956
- House in the Vineyard, Alsace, 1958
- Department store Karstadt Bremerhaven, 1958
- Haus Stoeckel, Ratingen-Breitscheid, 1959
- Outils-Wolf, factory for garden tools, Wissembourg, 1959–60
- House Dr. Berg, Düsseldorf, 1961
- Head office Karstadt, Essen, 1965–69
- House Starke, Essen, 1967
- Residential complex Münsterpark, Düsseldorf, 1970–75
- Kö-Galerie, Düsseldorf, 1983–86
- Heuvel-Galerie, Eindhoven, 1989–92
- Schadow-Arkaden, Düsseldorf, 1988–93
- Königs-Galerie, Kassel, 1992–95

== Bibliography ==
- Walter Brune: Die Stadtgalerie. Ein Beitrag zur Wiederbelebung der Innenstädte. Frankfurt am Main, New York 1996 ISBN 978-3-593-35479-8
- Walter Brune, Rolf Junker, Holger Pump-Uhlmann (Hrsg.): Angriff auf die City. Kritische Texte zur Konzeption, Planung und Wirkung von integrierten und nicht integrierten Shopping-Centern in zentralen Lagen. Düsseldorf 2006 ISBN 978-3-7700-1264-0
- Holger Pump-Uhlmann: Der erweiterte Lebensraum: Bungalows von Walter Brune. JOVIS Verlag Berlin 2008, ISBN 978-3-86859-009-8
- Holger Pump-Uhlmann: From Department Store to 'Stadtgalerie': Buildings for Retail Trade by Walter Brune. JOVIS Verlag Berlin 2011, ISBN 978-3-86859-105-7
