= Borough 2 (Düsseldorf) =

Stadtbezirk 2
- Borough of Düsseldorf
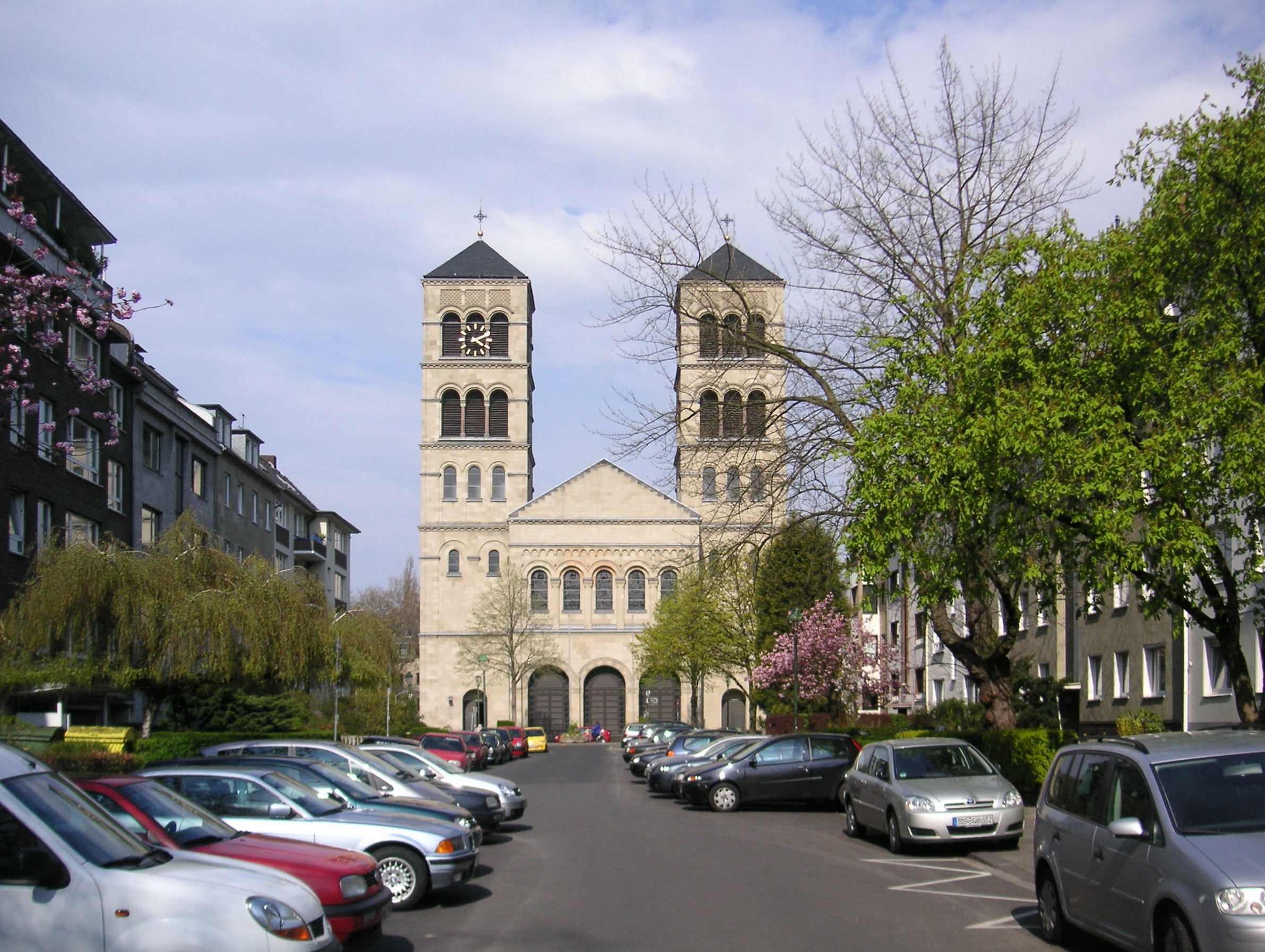
- Pauluskirche, Düsseldorf-Düsseltal

- Location of Stadtbezirk 2 within Düsseldorf
- Interactive map of Stadtbezirk 2
- Location within Germany Location within North Rhine-Westphalia
- Coordinates: 51°12′29″N 6°46′36″E
- Country: Germany
- State: North Rhine-Westphalia
- District: Urban district
- City: Düsseldorf
- Subdivisions: 3 quarters

Area
  - Total: 7.15 km^{2} (2.76 sq mi)

Population (2020-12-31)
  - Total: 64,183
  - Density: 8,980/km^{2} (23,200/sq mi)
- Time zone: UTC+01:00 (CET)
  - Summer (DST): UTC+02:00 (CEST)

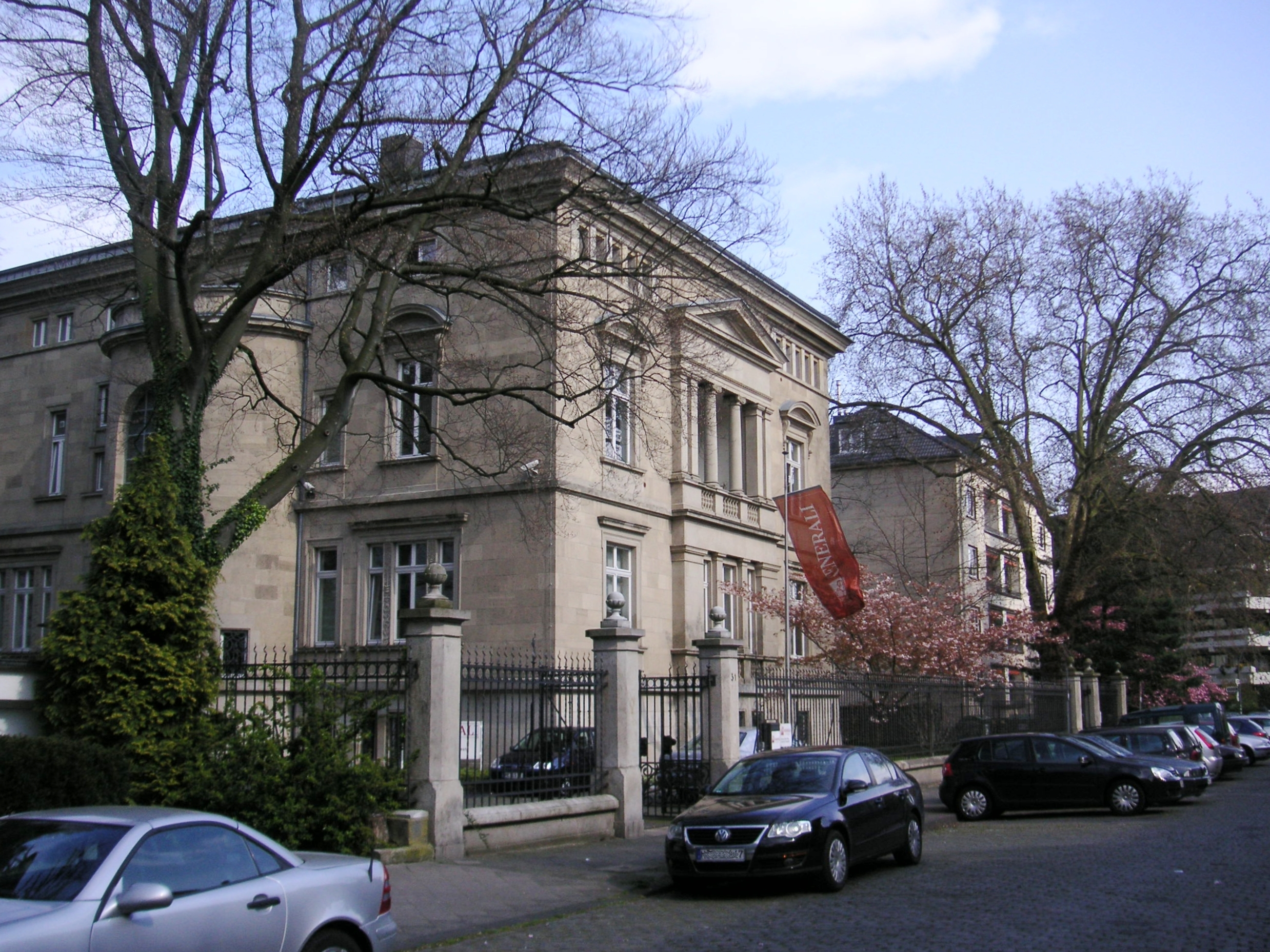
Humboldtstraße, Düsseltal

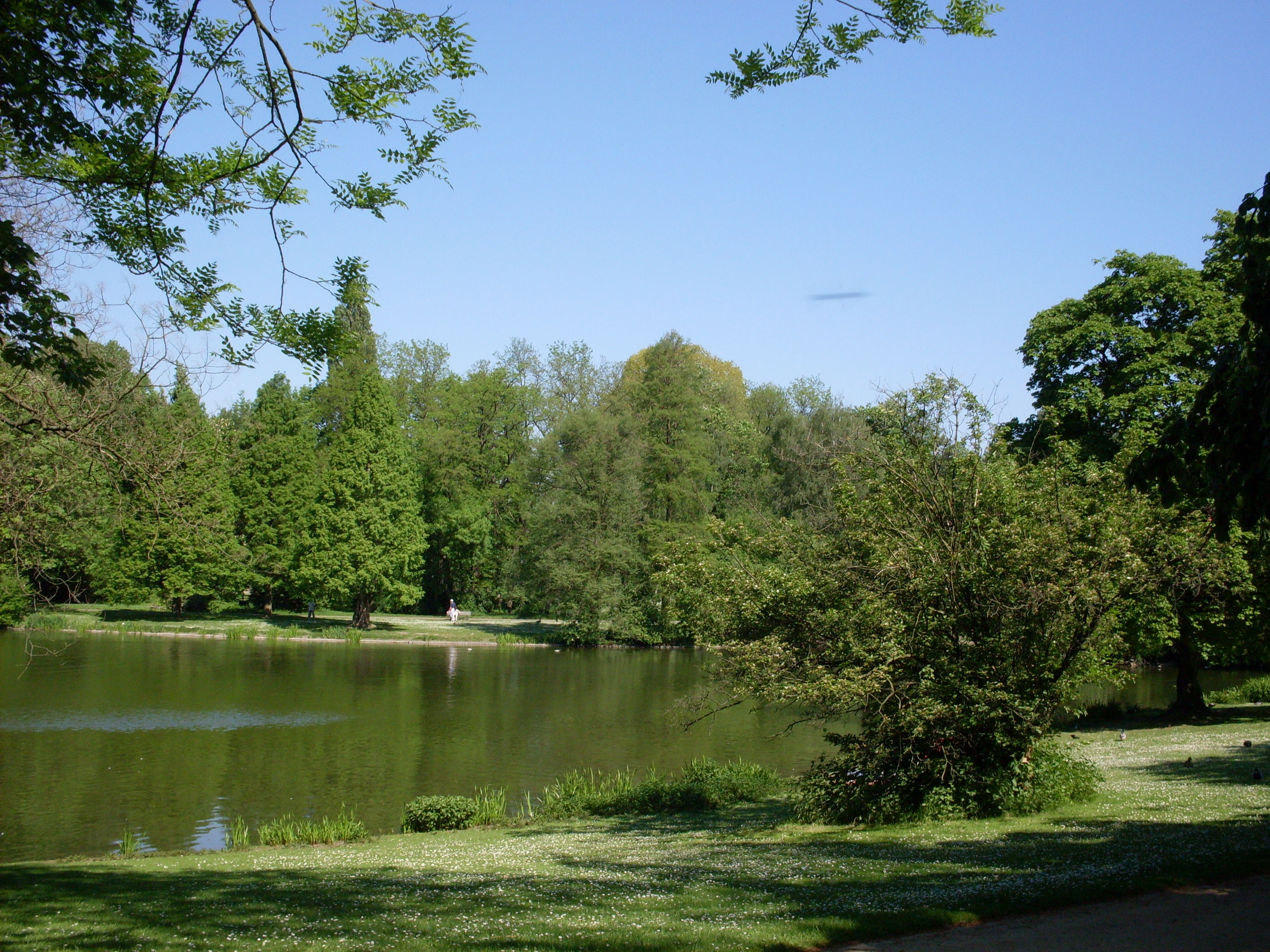
Zoopark (formerly Düsseldorf Zoological Garden) in Düsseltal

Borough 2 (German: Stadtbezirk 2) is a borough of Düsseldorf, the state capital of North Rhine-Westphalia, Germany. The borough covers an area of 7.15 square kilometres and (as of December 2020) has about 64,000 inhabitants.

Borough 2 is the smallest of all boroughs in Düsseldorf and next to the central city borough 1, it is the only of Düsseldorf's boroughs to not touch the city limits. Starting clockwise from North-west to South-west, Borough 2 borders with the following Düsseldorf boroughs: 1, 6, 7, 8 and 3.

== Subdivisions ==
Borough 2 is made up of three Stadtteile (city parts):

#	City part	Population (2020)	Area (km²)	Pop. per km²
021	Flingern-Süd	10,284	1.48	6,856
022	Flingern-Nord	25,867	2.79	9,271
023	Düsseltal	28,032	2.88	9,567

== Places of interest ==
=== Arts, Culture and Entertainment ===
- Eisstadion, Düsseltal

=== Landmarks ===
- Pauluskirche, Düsseltal

=== Parks and open spaces ===
- Zoopark

== Transportation ==
The borough is served by numerous railway stations and highway. Stations include Düsseldorf Zoo, Düsseldorf Flingern and a dense net of both Düsseldorf Stadtbahn underground- and Rheinbahn tram-stations. The borough can also be reached via Bundesautobahn 57 and Bundesstraße 7 and 8.

== See also ==
- Boroughs of Düsseldorf
