= Pempelfort =

Locality of Düsseldorf, Germany

Coordinates: 51°14′17″N 6°47′13″E

map of Düsseldorf, showing Pempelfort (in red) within Borough 1 (in pink)

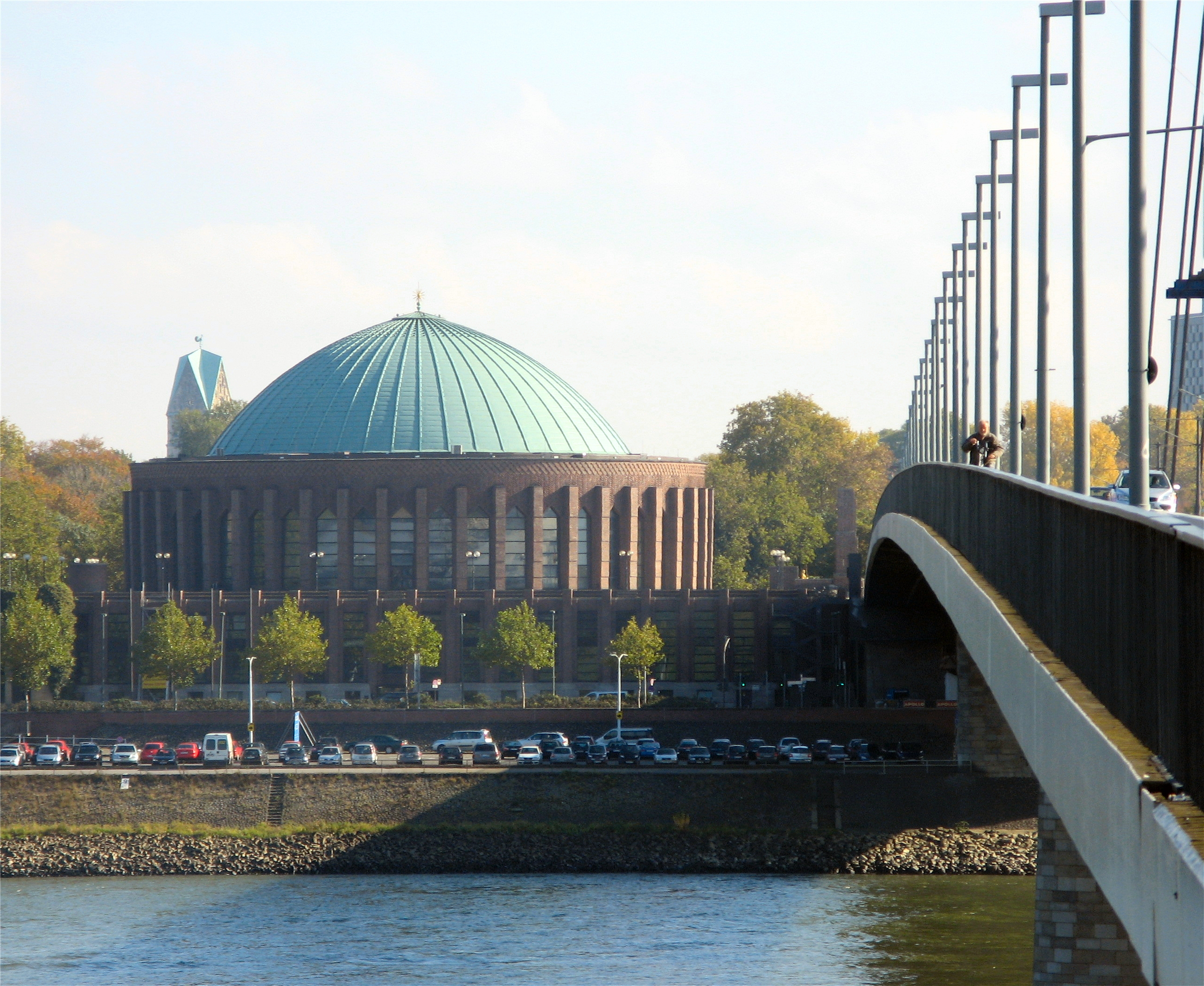
Tonhalle Düsseldorf

Pempelfort (German pronunciation: [ˈpɛmpl̩ˌfɔʁt]) is a city part in the North-east of the central Borough 1 of Düsseldorf.

It borders on Stadtmitte, Derendorf, the Cologne–Duisburg railway, connecting Flingern and Düsseltal, Oberbilk, Golzheim and the river Rhine.

Pempelfort has 33,137 inhabitants (2020) in an area of 2.70 km^{2}, or over 12,000 inhabitants per km^{2}. Some important institutions such as the District Administration / Prefecture of Düsseldorf (Bezirksregierung Düsseldorf) and the Higher Court of Düsseldorf (Oberlandesgericht) are located in Pempelfort. The head offices of the energy company E.ON and the Victoria Insurance company are also in Pempelfort.

There are museums and a music hall in Pempelfort:

- Theatermuseum (Museum of Theatre)
- Museum Kunstpalast (Ehrenhof)
- NRW Forum (Ehrenhof)
- Tonhalle Düsseldorf (Music Hall, Ehrenhof)

The Central Park of Düsseldorf, the Hofgarten, and the Rheinpark are the two green areas in the borough.

The Rochuskirche, a church dedicated to St. Rochus, was partially destroyed in World War II and has only one surviving tower; the rest of the church is in experimental style.
