= Golzheim =

Locality of Düsseldorf, Germany

Coordinates: 51°14′36″N 6°46′21″E

map of Düsseldorf, showing Golzheim (in red) within Borough 1 (in pink)

Golzheim (German pronunciation: [ˈɡɔltsˌhaɪm]) is a quarter of Düsseldorf in Borough 1 on the Rhine, just north of the city center. It is primarily a business and hotel district, but retains some of the old stately villas.

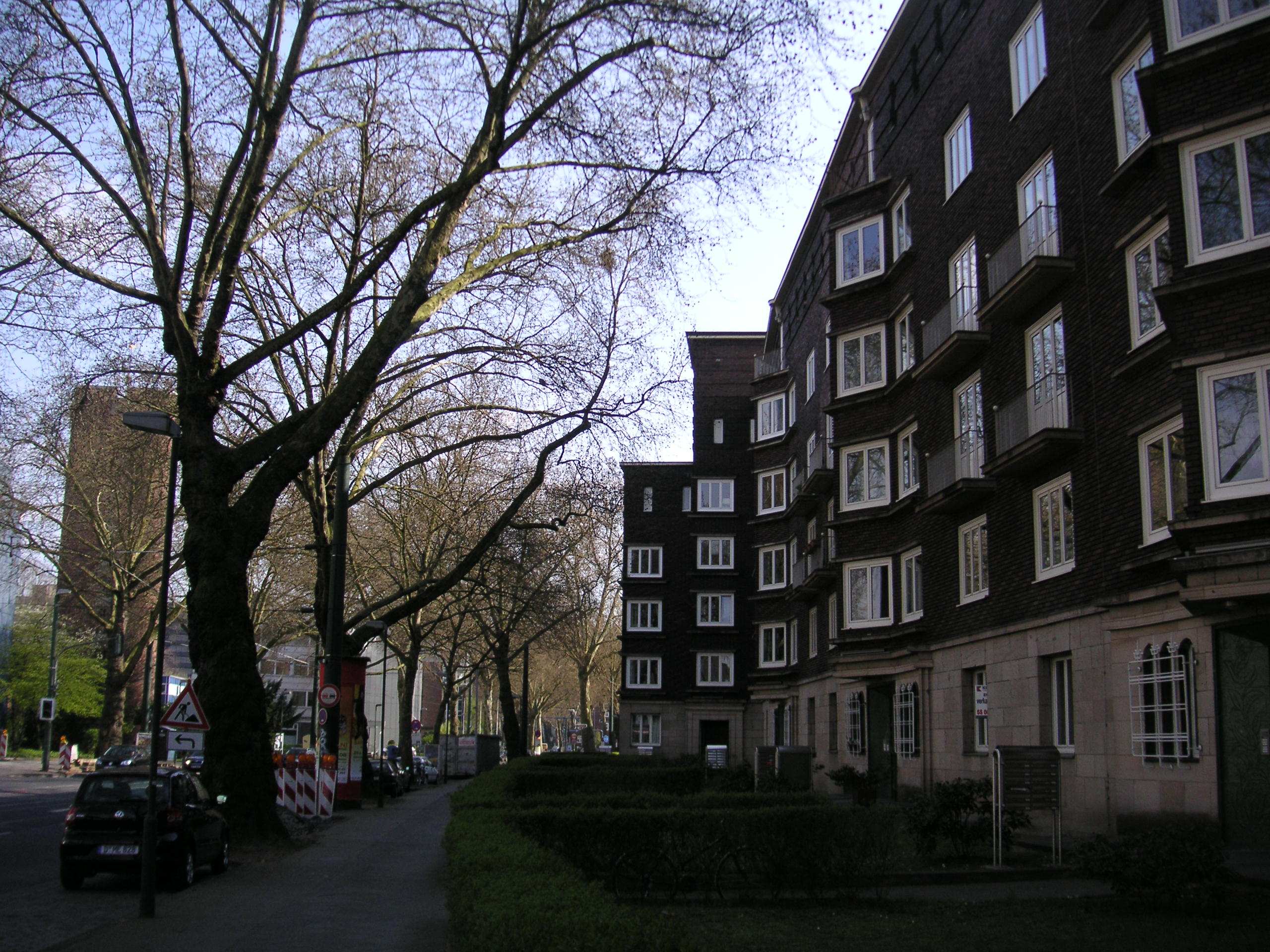

== History ==
The oldest parts of Düsseldorf are to be found in Golzheim and Stockum, but the Golzheim area was not so built-up that it could not accommodate the large international Trade Fair of 1902, and thus was established as the primary Düsseldorf exhibition site. It hosted the international national Health Fair of 1926 and the huge cultural NSDAP Exhibition of 1937. The waterfront on the Rhine, the Rheinpark Golzheim, owes its shape to these exhibitions.

Started in 1947, the annual Düsseldorf Trade Fair was held in Golzheim in the Ehrenhof complex, until the new exhibition grounds were built next to the airport in 1971.

Many of the apartments, surrounding the area of Kaiserswerther Straße and Uerdinger Straße, were used as holiday apartments for members of the German Armed Forces in the 1930s. From the air, gun emplacements can still be seen on top of these apartments and these were used to defend Düsseldorf during World War II.

Since 1958 Golzheim is the place of the New Synagogue of Düsseldorf, which is the religious center for about 7.500 members of the local Jewish community, the third largest in Germany.

== Economy and infrastructure ==
Golzheim is one of the most prestigious office addresses in the city. The tallest building is the Sky Office at 22 stories which was completed in 2006. On the Ehrenhof are the NRW-Forum Kultur und Wirtschaft (North Rhine-Westphalia Forum for Culture and Trade), and the art museum (Museum Kunst Palast). The Tonhalle Düsseldorf (concert hall), located next to Oberkassel bridge on the Rhine, used to be a planetarium. It and the Rheinpark Golzheim are important places for events.

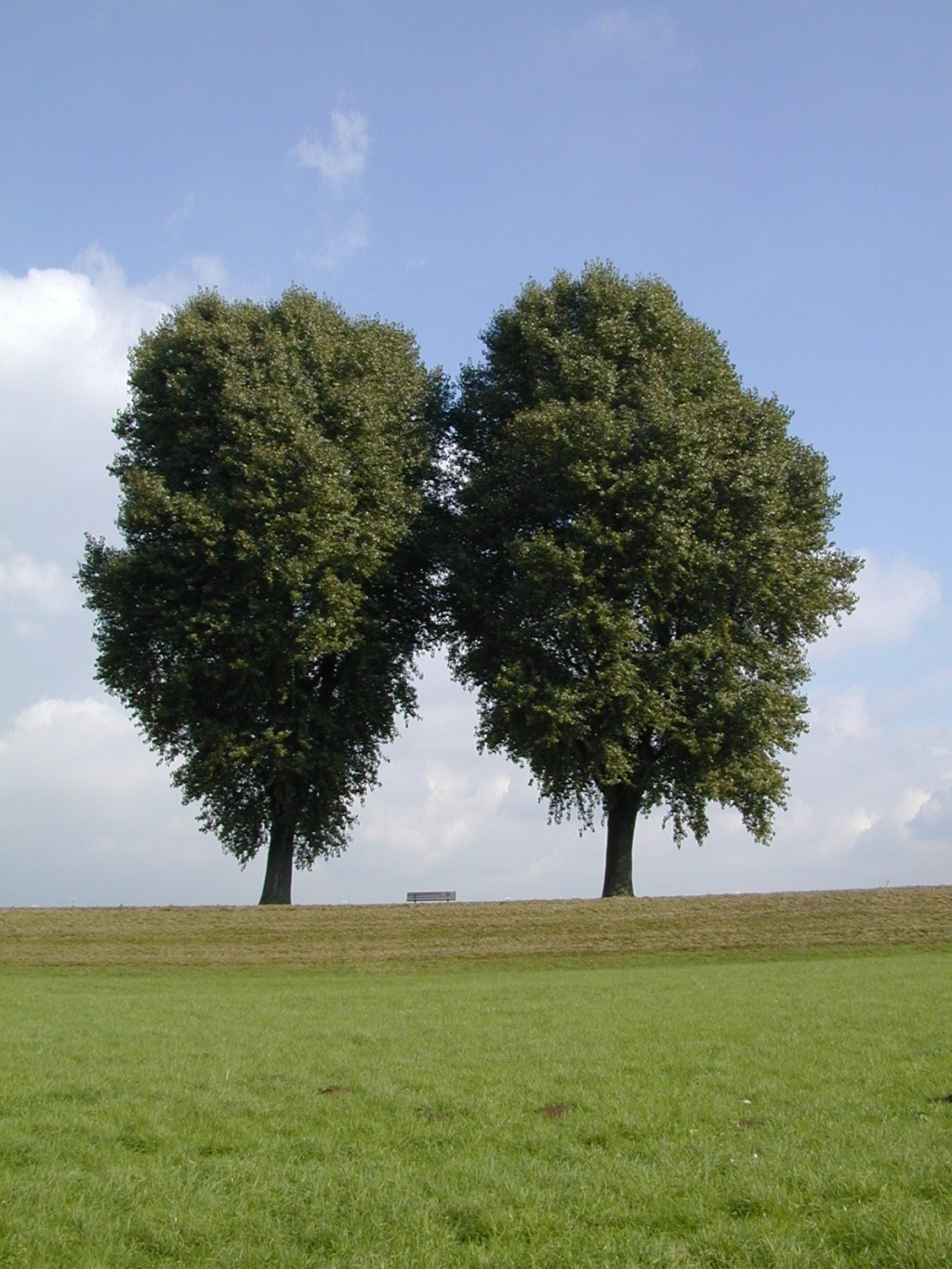
Trees in Rheinpark Golzheim in 2005

The land for the park was reclaimed from an old harbor basin in 1900 in preparation for the 1902 Exhibition, and was used for exhibition and trade fair purposes until 1926. After the international Health Fair of 1926, which had 7.5 million visitors, the area was turned into a park. Originally called "Kaiser-Wilhelm-Park", the Rheinpark Golzheim is not a classical park, but is more of a greenbelt, 24 hectares, between Cecilienallee and the Rhine, from the Oberkassel bridge to the Theodor Heuss bridge, with arranged copses of trees and plenty of open lawn for sunbathing and amateur volleyball games. The Circus Roncalli is located year-round in the park, and in the summer a local brewery sponsors an open-air cinema.

== Geography ==
Golzheim has an area of 2.56 km^{2} (0.99 sq mi), and 12,873 inhabitants (2020). Golzheim borders on the Rhine to the west, on Pempelfort to the south, on Kaiserswerth to the north, and on Derendorf to the east.
