= New Synagogue (Düsseldorf) =

Orthodox synagogue in Düsseldorf, Germany

- German: Leo Baeck Saal
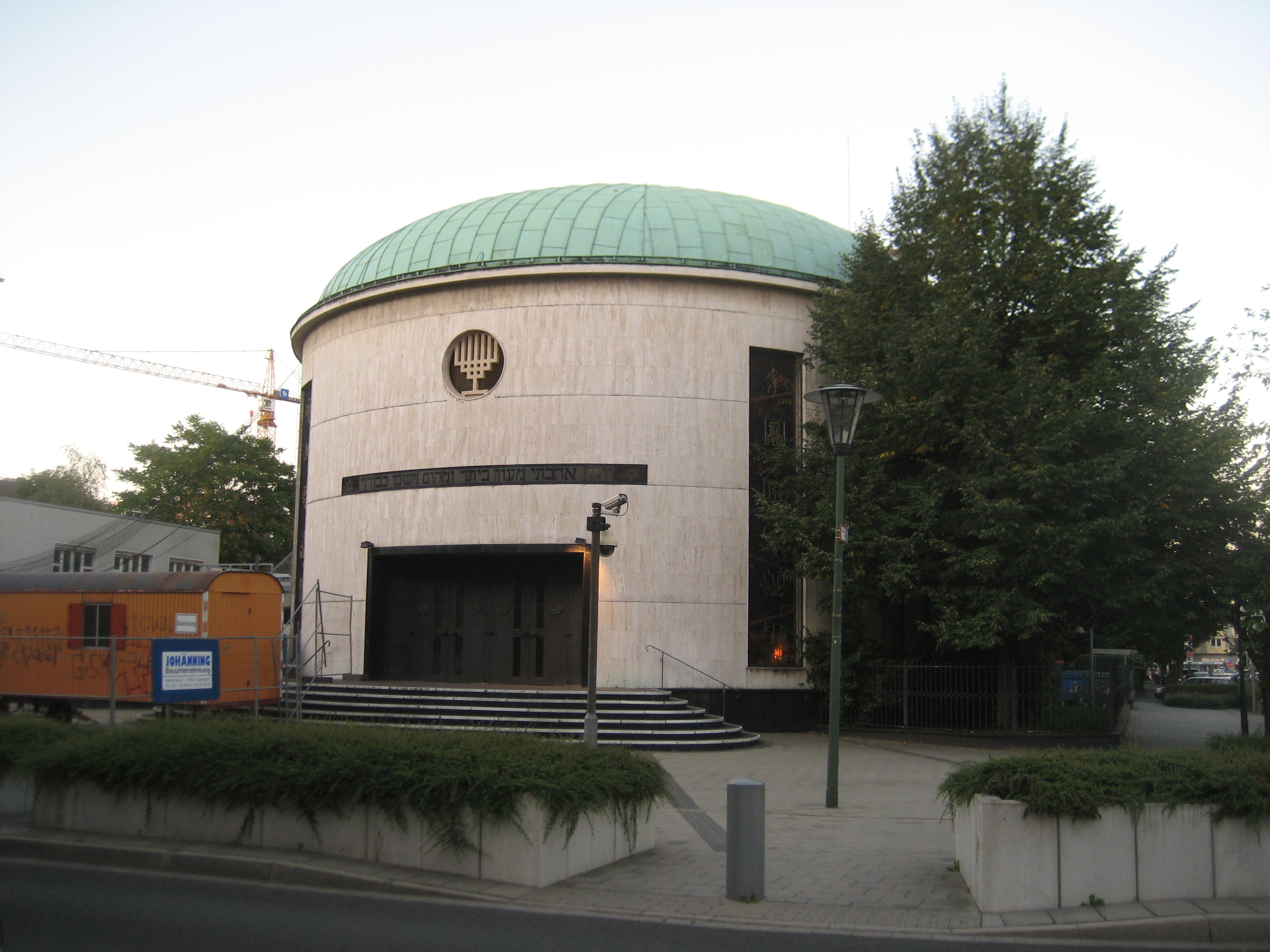
- Street view of synagogue exterior

- Location of the synagogue in North Rhine-Westphalia

Religion
- Affiliation: Orthodox Judaism
- Rite: Nusach Ashkenaz
- Ecclesiastical or organisational status: Synagogue
- Status: Active

Location
- Location: Zietenstraße 50, Düsseldorf, Golzheim, North Rhine-Westphalia 40476
- Country: Germany
- Coordinates: 51°14′35″N 6°46′43″E

Architecture
- Architect: Hermann Zvi Guttmann
- Type: Synagogue architecture
- Established: c. 1900 (as a congregation)
- Completed: 1958
- Materials: Concrete

Website
- jgdus.de (in German)

The New Synagogue (German: Leo Baeck Saal) is an Orthodox Jewish synagogue, located at Zietenstraße 50, in Düsseldorf, in the Golzheim district of the state of North Rhine-Westphalia, Germany.

== History ==
The first synagogue, built in 1905, with approximately 1,000 seats, was pillaged and burned by SA men during the Kristallnacht in 1938.

Designed by Hermann Zvi Guttmann, the current synagogue was inaugurated in September 1958 and is named in honour of Rabbi Leo Baeck, who served as a pulpit rabbi in Düsseldorf.

=== Arson attack ===
On October 2, 2000, two Arab immigrants committed an arson attack against the synagogue, and the building was firebombed with three Molotov cocktails. The perpetrators remained unknown for over two months, and most media suspected the attack was done by far-right antisemites. The following day, Paul Spiegel, leader of the Central Council of Jews in Germany, called for a clear sign of solidarity with the Jewish victims.

The perpetrators, a 20-year-old Palestinian, and a 19-year-old Moroccan, were identified and arrested on December 6, 2000. Both admitted they wanted to protest against the Israeli occupation policy through the attack.

Since 2000, there is a constant police watch over the synagogue.

== See also ==
- History of the Jews in Germany
- List of synagogues in Germany (in German)
