= Tausendfüßler =

Coordinates: 51°13′33″N 6°46′58″E

The Tausendfüßler (German: millipede) was an elevated street in Düsseldorf from 1961 to 2013.

== Construction ==
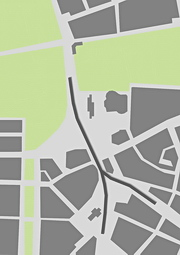

The concept of the bridge was a kind of swinging Y: The traffic flowed (only in only direction) from the north on three tracks in a soft curve. In the middle of the bridge the traffic split. Two tracks went to the east and followed the curve in direction to the Düsseldorf main station, two other tracks (the incoming middle track was split) followed a soft curve in the other direction, together with the first curve an S-curve in southern direction.

Its length was 536 meters, 391 meters on its main direction north to south, 145 meters in the east direction. On its three-tracks part it has a width of 25 meters.

It was constructed in the years 1961 to 1962, following a concept of automotive mobility in Düsseldorf from the 1950s.

The Tausendfüßler belongs to a building ensemble from the early 1960s together with the Schauspielhaus Düsseldorf (City Theatre) and the Dreischeibenhaus (a skyscraper).

The architect of the Tausendfüßler was Friedrich Tamms, a professor on architecture and a member of the city council.

In December 1993 the Tausendfüßler was listed in the list of city monuments in the category Technical monuments, buildings and equipment for road.

== Demolition ==
It was demolished in 2013, as part of the Kö-Bogen project.
