= Derendorf =

Locality of Düsseldorf, Germany

Coordinates: 51°14′38″N 6°47′33″E

Map of Düsseldorf, showing Derendorf (in red) within Borough 1 (in pink)

Derendorf (German pronunciation: [ˈdeːʁənˌdɔʁf]) is a quarter of Düsseldorf, Germany, part of the central Borough 1. It is located north of Pempelfort and Golzheim, west of Mörsenbroich and south of Unterrath.

Derendorf has an area of 3.36 km^{2} (1.30 sq mi), and 20,584 inhabitants (2020).

Derendorf was mentioned as a settlement first time in 1100. In 1384 Derendorf became a part of Düsseldorf. There has been a slaughterhouse in Derendorf since 1602 but the main growth of Derendorf was in the time of Industrial Revolution.

Derendorf is traditionally an industrial area of Düsseldorf, inhabited mostly by a working-class population. The steelworks of Rheinmetall, the slaughterhouse and the brewery Schlösser are located here .

Many inhabitants of Derendorf are immigrants from Turkey, and the borough houses the central mosque of the Muslims in Düsseldorf.

== See also ==
- Düsseldorf-Derendorf station
