= Flingern =

Borough of Düsseldorf, Germany

Coordinates: 51°13′37″N 6°48′48″E

map of Düsseldorf, showing Flingern-Nord (in red) within Borough 2 (in pink)

Flingern (German pronunciation: [ˈflɪŋɐn]) is a quarter of Düsseldorf, part of Borough 2. Located northeast of Düsseldorf (proper), it is divided into two Stadtteile today: Flingern-Nord and Flingern-Süd. While Flingern-Nord has a younger population and is more attractive to middle-class families, Flingern-Süd is still mostly home to working-class people. Flingern has an area of 4.27 km^{2} (1.65 sq mi), and 36,151 inhabitants (2020).

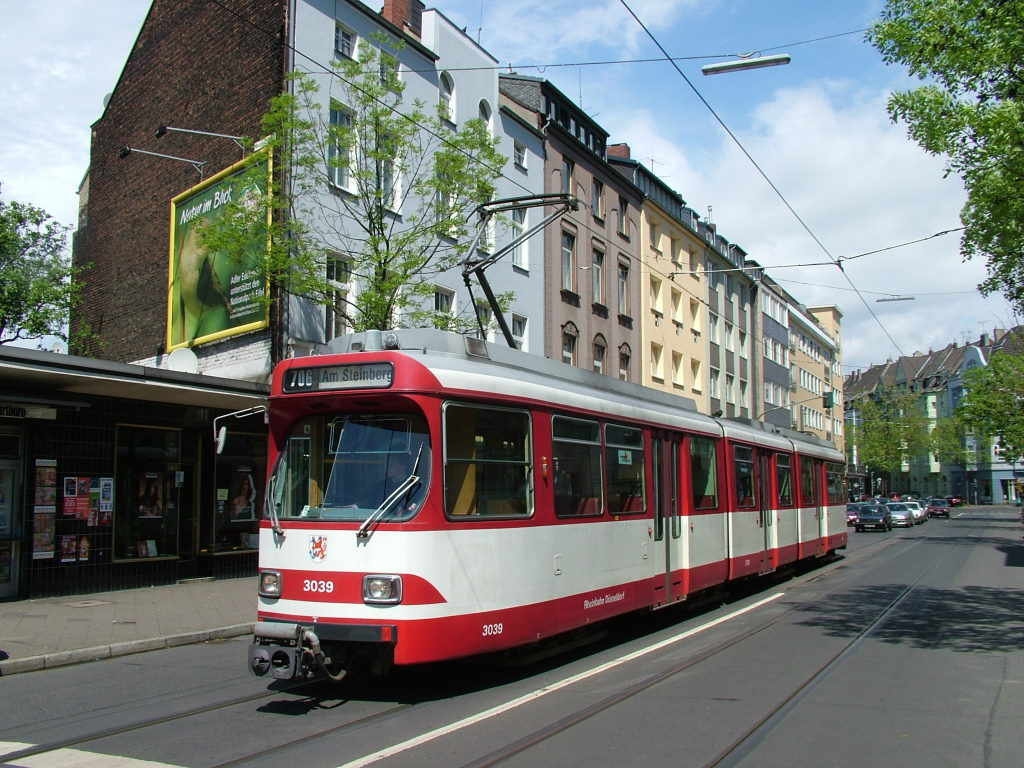

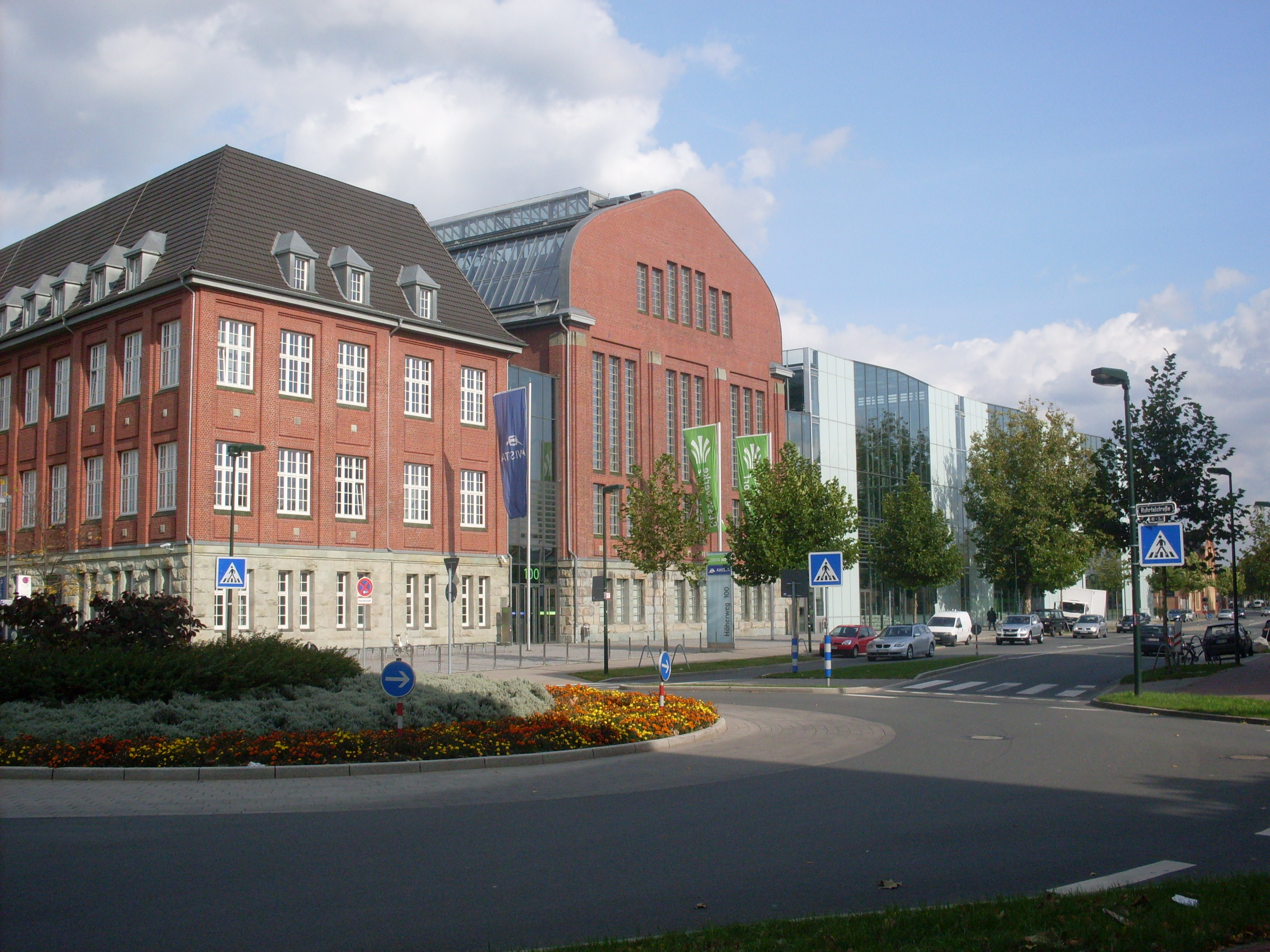

Flingern was first mentioned in 1193 as a forested area that was ruled by the Knights Hayc of Flingern. In the 13th and 14th centuries the City of Düsseldorf grew on the grounds of the Knights Hayc von Flingern. By the end of the 14th century the knights lost their influence.

Jan Wellem, Elector Palantine, constructed the Flinger Steinweg which was a paved road leading from Düsseldorf through Flingern to Gerresheim.

During the Industrial Revolution Flingern became an industrial and working class town and to this day it has many old and new factories. Only the old facade remains of the old baths of the early 20th century, which has been converted into a modern wellness center on the inside. An old steel factory was converted to a popular discothèque called Stahlwerk and was one of the early venues playing Techno music in the 1990s.
