= Düsseldorf-Carlstadt =

Quarter of Düsseldorf

Coordinates: 51°13′22″N 6°46′16″E

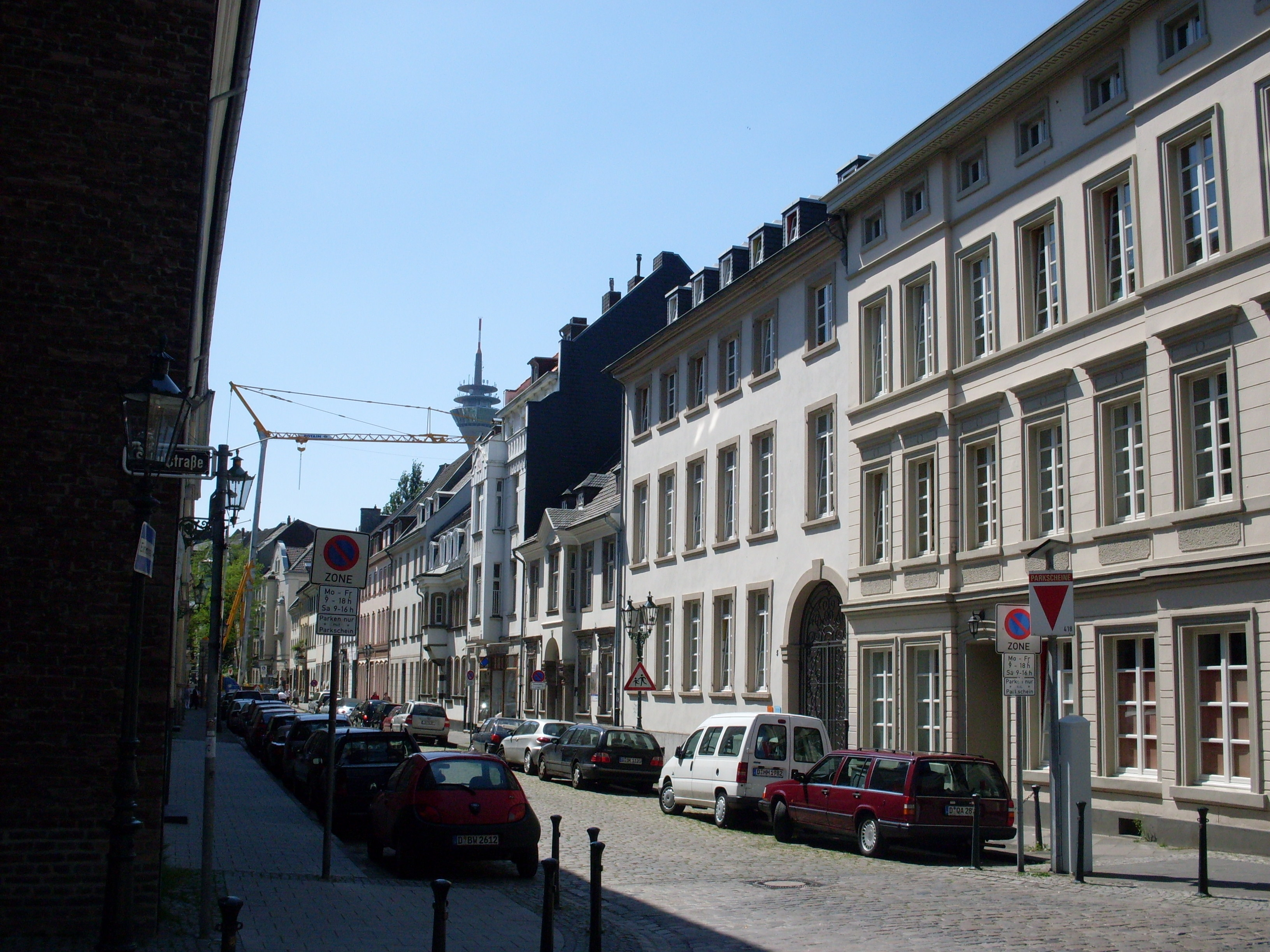
Zitadellstraße in Carlstadt

map of Düsseldorf, showing Carlstadt (in red) within Borough 1 (in pink)

Carlstadt (German pronunciation: [ˈkaʁlˌʃtat]) is a quarter of Düsseldorf and belongs to the central Borough 1. It lies south of the Old Town (Altstadt) and was named after the Duke Carl-Theodor, who founded this borough.

Carlstadt has an area of 0.45 km^{2} (0.17 sq mi). It is the smallest borough of Düsseldorf. It has 2,259 inhabitants (2020).

Its economical life is mainly based on upper class shops. One of the three European central offices of Vodafone is in Carlstadt. The Heinrich Heine Institute and the Robert Schumann Society are in Carlstadt. Clara and Robert Schumann lived for a couple of years in Carlstadt. Well-known is the Carlsplatz, the central market place of Düsseldorf in Carlstadt.
