= Altstadt (Düsseldorf) =

Quarter of Düsseldorf, Germany

Coordinates: 51°13′44″N 6°46′25″E

Düsseldorf townhall and the statue of Jan Wellem.

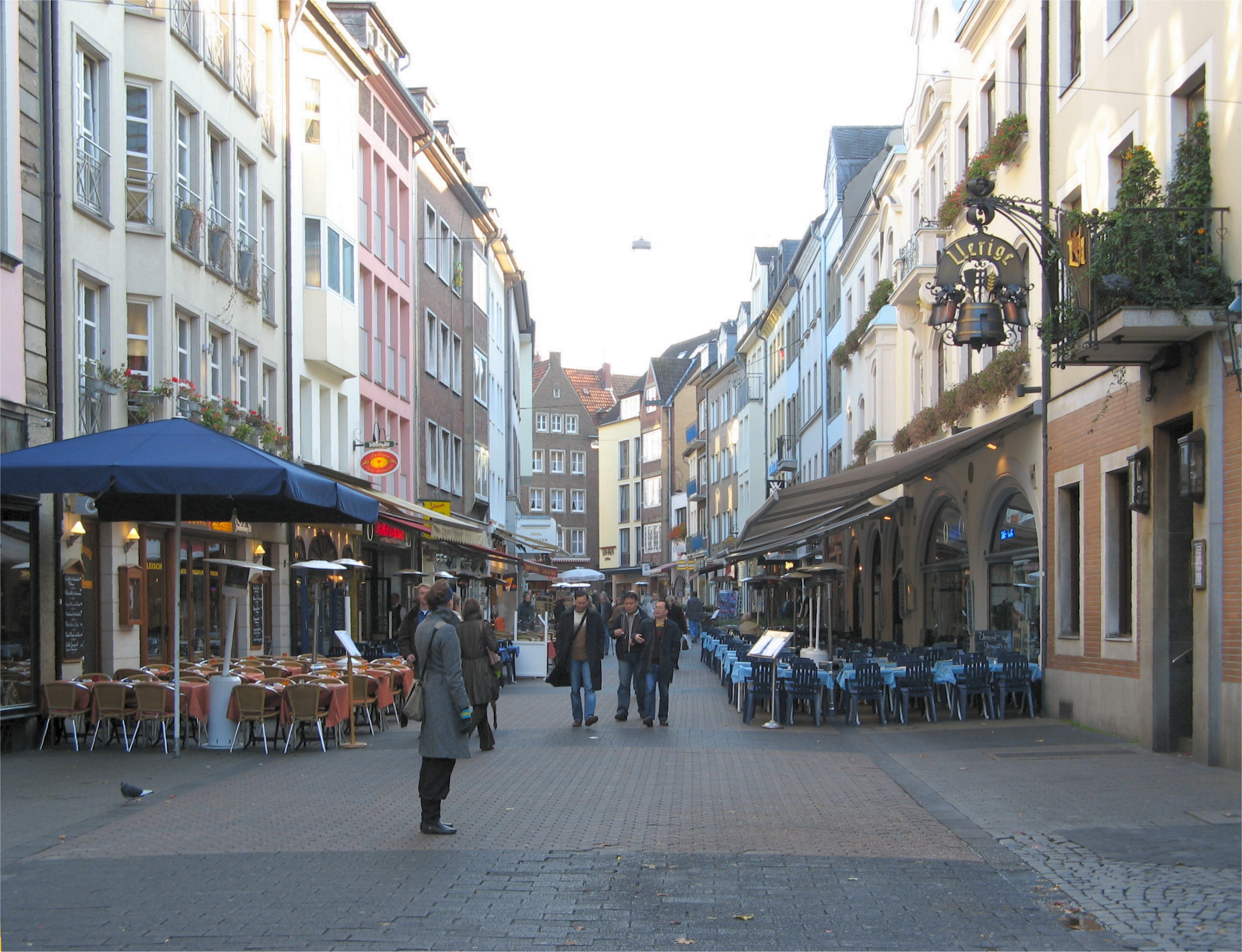
Street in Altstadt

map of Düsseldorf, showing Altstadt (in red) within Borough 1 (in pink)

The Altstadt (German pronunciation: [ˈaltˌʃtat], lit. 'old town') is one of the 50 quarters (Stadtteile) of Düsseldorf, Germany; it belongs to central Borough 1. The Düsseldorfer Altstadt is known as "the longest bar in the world" (längste Theke der Welt), because the small Old Town has more than 300 bars and discothèques; supposedly, each establishment's bar-counter connecting to one next door.

Düsseldorf is famed for its special beer, Altbier ("old beer"), brewed from an old traditional recipe, which is only produced in a few places in the world since the end of the 19th century.

The Old Town has an area of 0.48 square kilometer (which is less than a quarter of a percent of the whole city) and has 2,429 inhabitants (2020), less than half a percent of the population of Düsseldorf. The density of population is thus 5,398 inhabitants/km^{2}.

== Main sights ==
- Basilica St. Lambertus
- Schlossturm - housing the shipping museum
- The Old City Hall (Rathaus)
- Equestrian statue of Jan Wellem on the Market place
- St. Ursula-Gymnasium, old Grammar School
- Rhine Tower
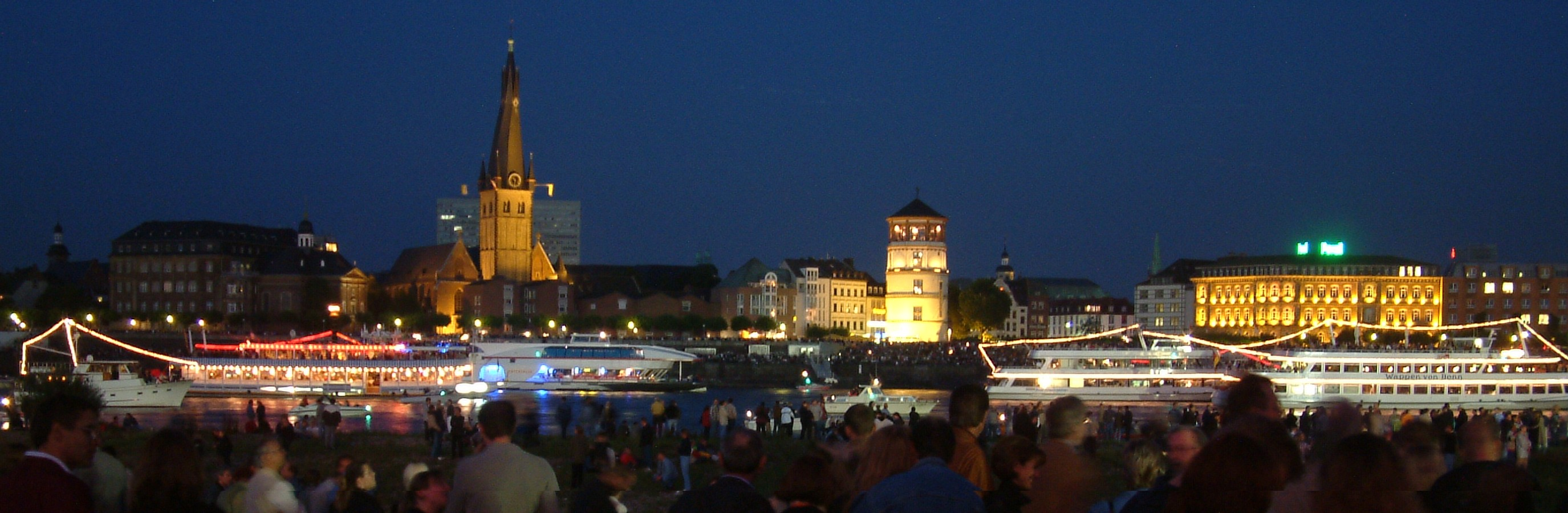
A panorama of the Altstadt.
