= Ernst Huhn =

German architects

- Born: 1894
- Died: 1964 (aged 69–70)
- Occupation: Architect
- Organization: Association of German Architects

Ernst Huhn (1894–1964) was a German architect who first rebuilt and later designed cinemas, theatres and inns, including the Schauspielhaus Bad Godesberg, Germany's first new theatre after the Second World War

== Life ==
Huhn was one of the close collaborators of the architect Wilhelm Kreis for a long time during his Düsseldorf years (1908–1926). From the end of the 1920s, Huhn emerged, especially in the area of the Rhineland, as an architect for cinema and theatre buildings as well as inns. He worked in Düsseldorf and was a member of the Association of German Architects. He reported on some of his buildings in the trade journal Bühnentechnische Rundschau.

== Projects ==
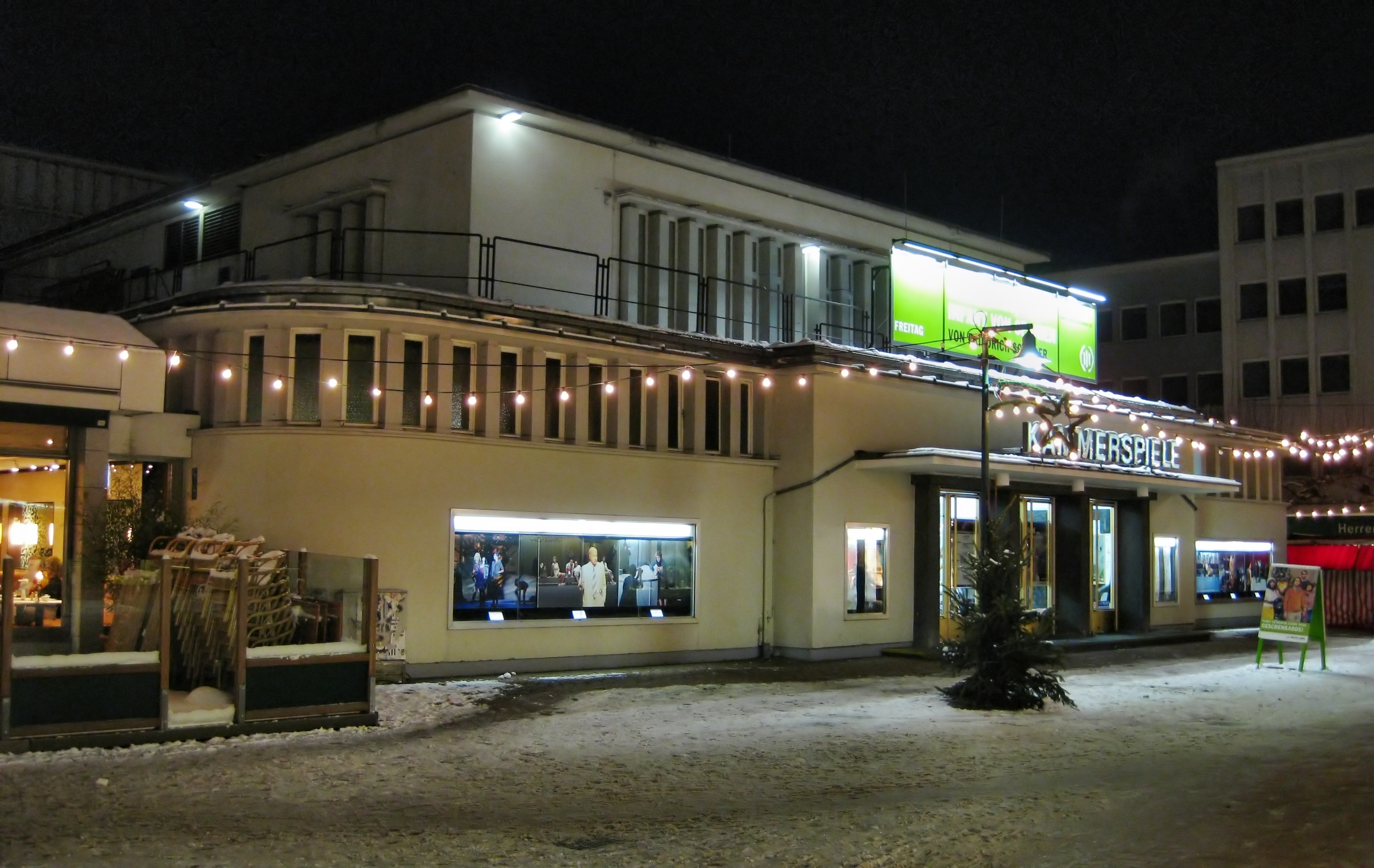
Schauspielhaus Bad Godesberg, 2010

- 1926: Ice pavilion at the GeSoLei exhibition in Düsseldorf
- 1928: Odeon cinema, rebuilding a ball room nn Düsseldorf-Unterbilk
- 1928: Nationaltheater cinema, rebuilding the Kaiser-Friedrich-Halle in Viersen, Heierstraße 2
- 1935: Apollo-Theater (Siegen)
- 1936: Capitol cinema in Bielefeld.
- 1936: Rebuilding Hotel Fürstenhof hotel in Cologne.
- 1949: Modernising Europa-Palast cinema in Düsseldorf, Graf-Adolf-Straße (location of the Arabisches Café Düsseldorf until 1938)
- 1949: Reconstruction of Modernes Theater (UFA cinema)“ in Wuppertal
- 1950: Reconstruction of the Apollo-Theater in Düsseldorf (with more than 3000 seats)
- 1951: Reconstruction of Viktoria-Theater cinema in Hagen
- 1951–1952: Schauspielhaus Bad Godesberg, Germany's first new theatre after the Second World War
- 1953: Theater am Aegi in Hanover (together with Hans Klüppelberg and Gerd Lichtenhahn)
- 1954: Stadttheater Remscheid
- 1954: Atlantis-Palast cinema in Duisburg-Marxloh, Weseler Straße 66
- 1954–1956: Opernhaus Düsseldorf (together with Julius Schulte-Frohlinde and Paul Bonatz)
- 1955: Kino Ufa-Palast in Cologne, Hohenstaufenring
- around 1960: Wohn- und Geschäftshaus with cinema in Cologne, Kaiser-Wilhelm-Ring 30–32
- until 1963: Studiohaus of Firma Rosenthal in Düsseldorf, Königsallee / Graf-Adolf-Straße (together with Günter Huhn)
