= Landesfunkhaus Niedersachsen =

Broadcast centre in Hanover, Lower Saxony, Germany

State Radio House of Lower Saxony
- Landesfunkhaus Niedersachsen
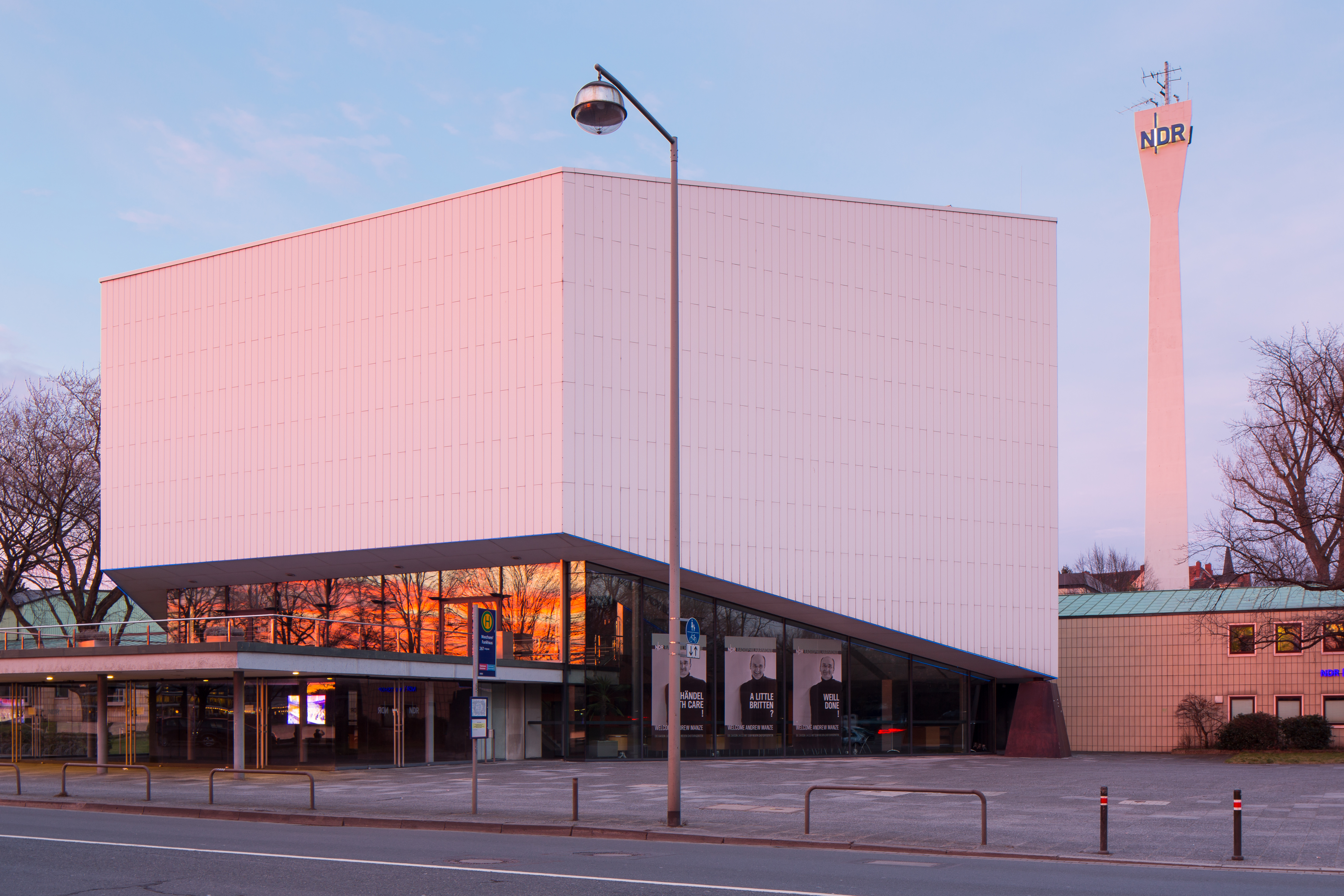
- Exterior of the large broadcasting hall (Großer Sendesaal), with the antenna tower in the background
- Interactive map of the State Radio House of Lower Saxony area
- Former names: Hanover Radio House (Funkhaus Hannover)

General information
- Location: Hanover, Germany
- Coordinates: 52.36069°N 9.74175°E
- Inaugurated: 20 January 1951
- Owner: Norddeutscher Rundfunk

Design and construction
- Architects: Friedrich Wilhelm Kraemer; Gerd Lichtenhahn; Dieter Oesterlen

The State Radio House of Lower Saxony (German: Landesfunkhaus Niedersachsen) is a group of buildings owned by the public broadcaster Norddeutscher Rundfunk in Hanover, the state capital of Lower Saxony, Germany.

The broadcaster is based in Hamburg, but has facilities in the capitals of other states that it serves. The building group is situated at the Rudolf von Bennigsen Esplanade on the eastern shore of the Maschsee. When it was built in 1949–1952, it was known as the Hanover Radio House (Funkhaus Hannover). In addition to administrative buildings and an antenna tower, it includes two halls for public concerts: the large broadcasting hall (Großer Sendesaal) opened in 1963, and the small broadcasting hall (Kleiner Sendesaal).

== History ==
The history of broadcasting in Hanover dates back to 1924 when the first radio programs were aired from a factory building of the engineering firm Hanomag. After World War II, that building was in the British zone. A new office (Rundfunkbüro) was opened in the Anzeiger-Hochhaus in 1945, and first concerts were aired from buildings of the Pädagogische Hochschule (school of education). Regular broadcasting, now by the Nordwestdeutscher Rundfunk (NWDR) began in 1948, including symphony concerts and the series Funkbilder aus Niedersachsen (radio images from Lower Saxony), which began with the second Export-Messe.

Plans for a new Funkhaus began end of 1948. Rudolf Hillebrecht, responsible for municipal building, voted for the location, to set an example for buildings along the lake. After a competition, designs by Friedrich Wilhelm Kraemer, Gerd Lichtenhahn and Dieter Oesterlen were combined. The first buildings were completed in 1950, and inaugurated on 20 January 1951. Due to the advanced technical equipment of the complex, it was immediately called the most modern Funkhaus in Europe. In 1955 the NWDR was split in the NDR in Hamburg and the Westdeutscher Rundfunk (WDR) in Cologne. A redaction team of the NDR was installed in the Funkhaus in 1958.

Oesterlen designed the concert hall Großer Sendesaal which was built from 1960 to 1963. From 1 January 1981, the complex was called Landesfunkhaus Niedersachsen. In 1989, it became a registered monument of the Deutsche Stiftung Denkmalschutz.
