= Steigenberger Parkhotel Düsseldorf =

Hotel in Düsseldorf, Germany

Steigenberger Icon Parkhotel
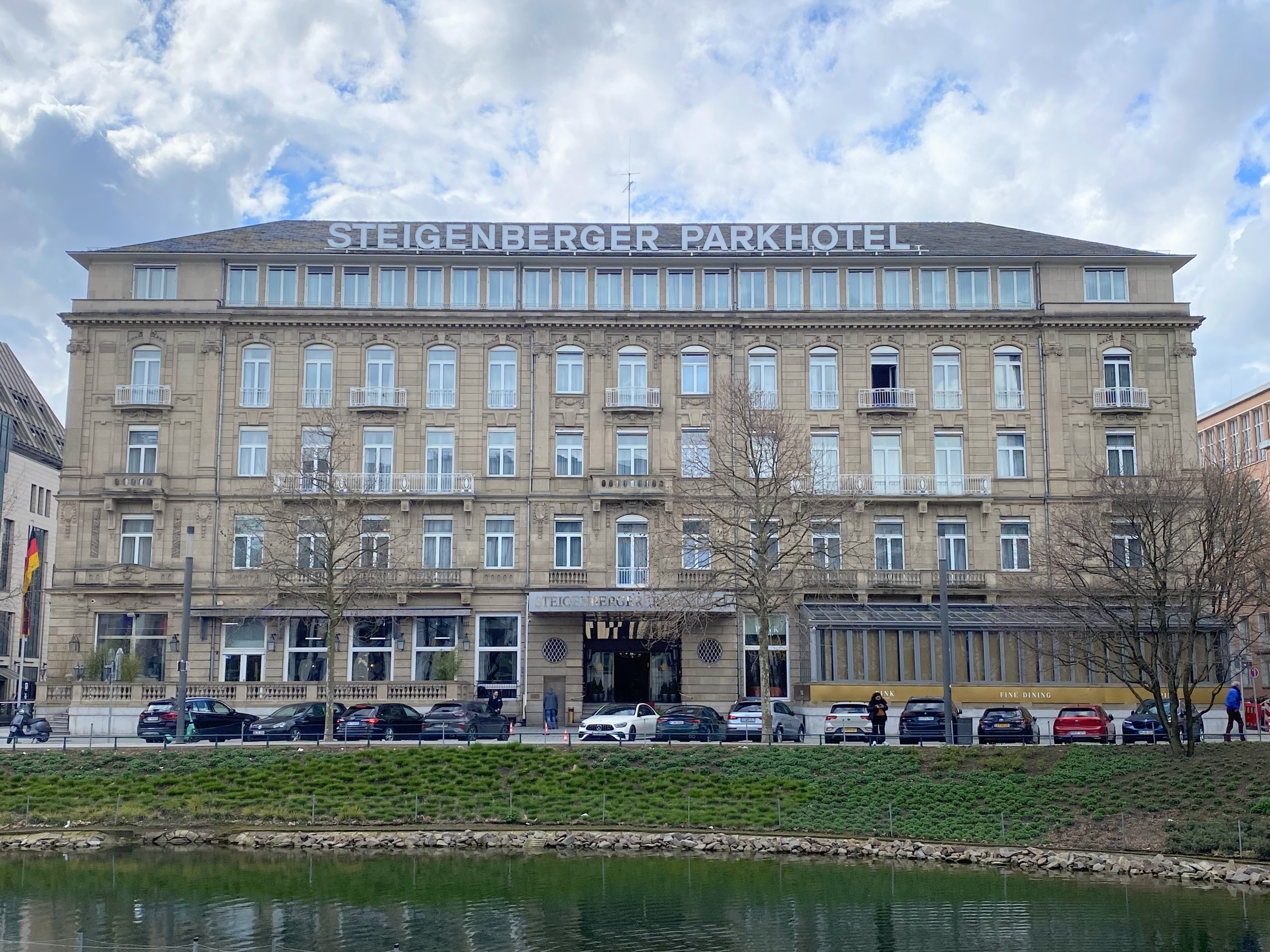
- Hotel chain: Steigenberger Hotels

General information
- Location: Düsseldorf, Germany, Königsallee 1a
- Coordinates: 51°13′36″N 6°46′42″E
- Opening: 1902

Other information
- Number of rooms: 119
- Number of suites: 11
- Number of restaurants: 1

Website
- www.steigenberger.com

The Steigenberger Icon Parkhotel (originally the Parkhotel) is a 5-Star Steigenberger Hotel in Düsseldorf, Germany, located on the city's famous Königsallee and next to the Hofgarten and the opera house.

== History ==
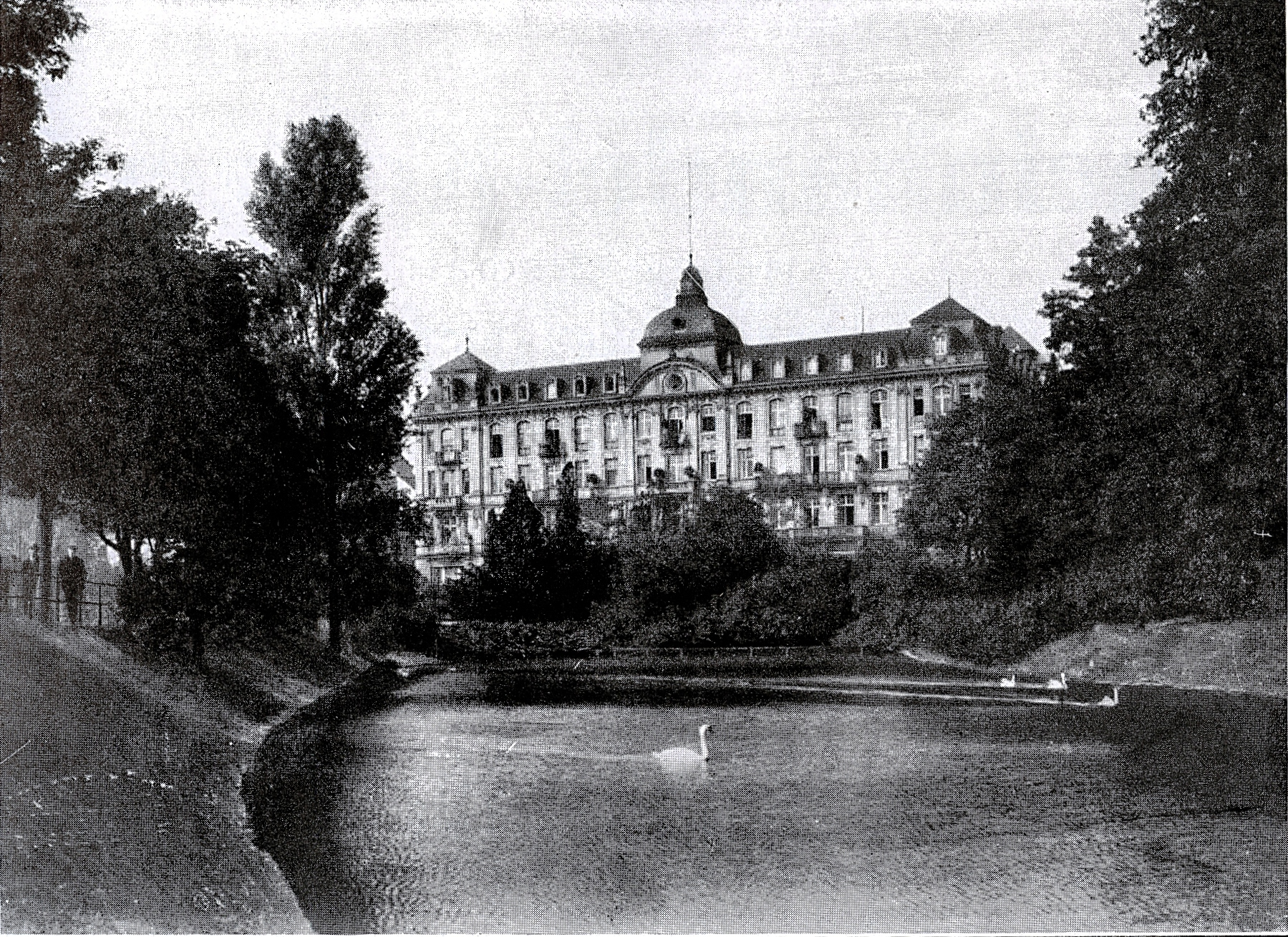
Parkhotel, circa 1909

The Parkhotel opened in 1902 to accommodate guests visiting the city for that year's Industrial and Commercial Exhibition. It was badly damaged by air raids in 1944, with the top floors burned out. From 1945 to 1951, it was used as offices by first the American and later the British occupying forces. From 1951 to 1953, it housed the headquarters offices of Mannesmann. Steigenberger Hotels bought the property in 1953 and renovated it, adding a new top floor.

== See also ==
- Breidenbacher Hof
