= Funkhaus =

Funkhaus may refer to:

- Funkhaus Berlin, a cultural, entertainment, and recording complex
- Funkhaus Europa, former name of a German public radio station
- Funkhaus Hannover, former name of a German radio broadcast facility
- Funkhaus Lebanon, an electronic music center and teaching facility
