= Hans Klüppelberg =

German architect

Hans Klüppelberg (25 May 1904 – 31 May 1962) was a German architect.

== Life ==
Klüppelberg was born in 1904 in Moscow during the Czarist era, where his father worked as a civil engineer. In 1910, the family first moved to Remscheid, then to Hanover in 1912. There Hans Klüppelberg attended the Humboldtschule Hannover until his Abitur in 1922. He then began a commercial apprenticeship, during which a doctor friend discovered Klüppelberg's talent for drawing. Thus, Klüppelberg came into contact with the architect Adolf Falke, who taught him how to draw. During this time, a lifelong fatherly friendship develops between the two men

In 1924, Klüppelberg himself began studying architecture at the University of Hanover, where he completed his main state examination in 1928. He then worked in various architectural offices for several years until - after the seizure of power by the Nazis - he became self-employed in 1934.

In 1939, the year World War II began, Klüppelberg was conscripted into service as an employee at the Heeresbauamt Hannover, but was able to avoid this job after a successful application to the UFA film company in Babelsberg. From then on, he built halls and functional buildings for the German film industry at various locations. During these years under the Nazi regime, Klüppelberg secretly delegated various planning tasks to his former mentor, the architect Adolf Falke, who had in the meantime been banned from the profession and was therefore forced to remain inactive. Although this transfer of work was not visible to the public, the two men were always in danger of being exposed and politically punished by the Nazi regime.

After the war, Klüppelberg returned to Hanover in 1945, where he resumed his work as a freelance architect. Even before the founding of the Federal Republic of Germany, he was admitted to the Association of German Architects on 9 January 1947 (BDA).

Klüppelberg soon also worked as a member of the "expert-(building maintenance) advisory board" of the state capital of Hanover.

Klüppelberg died in Hanover at the age of 58.

== Constructions ==
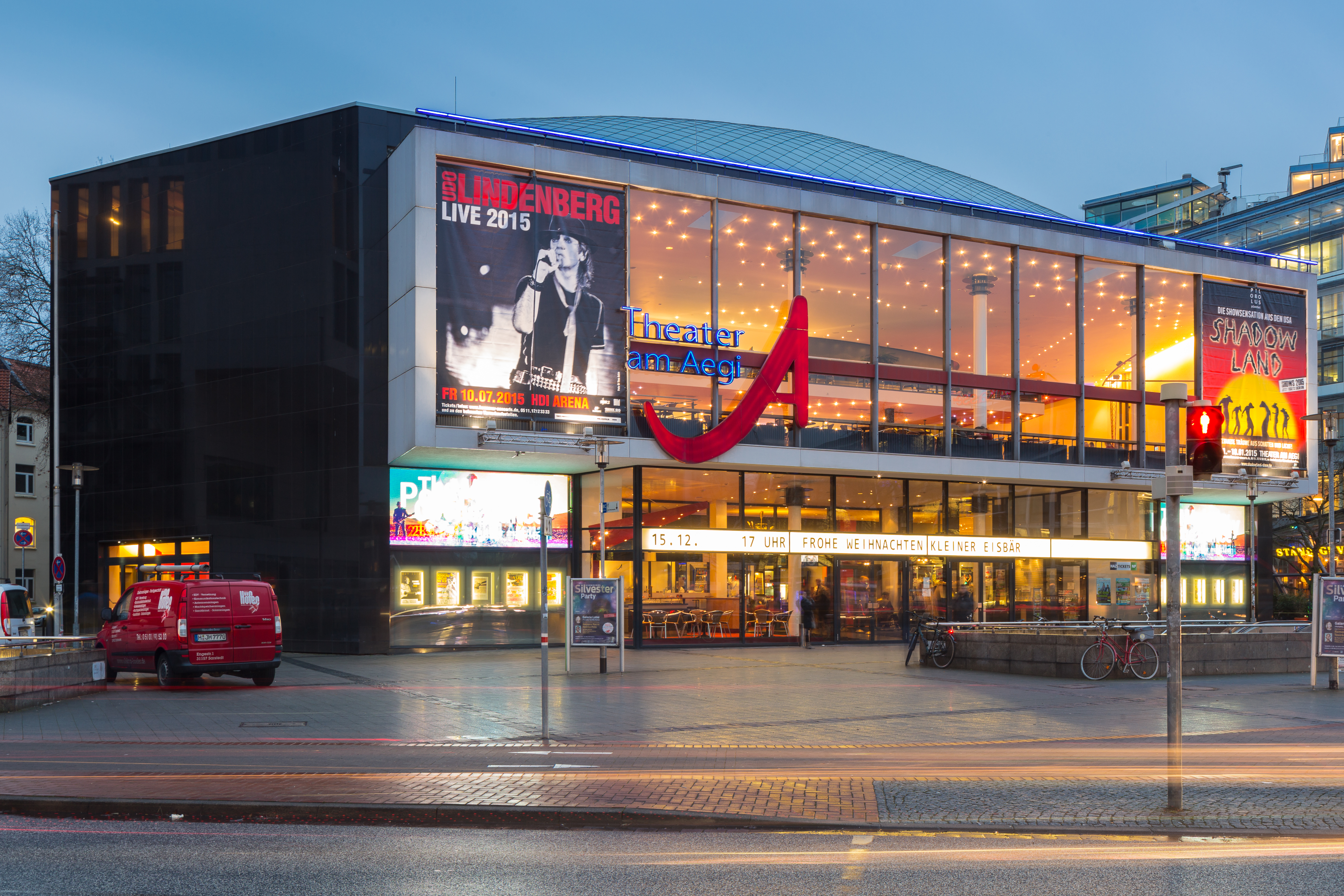
Completed in 1953, the Theater am Aegi; Photo from the end of 2014

- 1953, with Ernst Huhn and Gerd Lichtenhahn: Theater am Aegi.
- 1954:
  - Schünemannbau at Kröpcke
  - 20 April: Opening of the Maschseegaststätte, previously released by the British Zone and then rebuilt and extended by Gerd Lichtenhahn and Klüppelberg.
- 1955:
  - Mietswohnhäuser Riepestraße 1 - 8 and Hildesheimer Straße 220/212 (with Gerd Lichtenhahn).
  - with Gerd Lichtenhahn: three-storey commercial building in the Steintorblock.
- 1956:
  - Unmarried people's home of the Sozialwerk der Bauhandwerker (Social Association of Building Craftsmen), "Haltenhoffstraße 226".
  - Commercial building Jo Schmidt, Kurt-Schumacher-Straße Ecke Goseriede
  - with Gerd Lichtenhahn: Administrative building of the Philips Deutschland, Volgersweg Ecke Hinüberstraße.
- 1959: Retirement home Am Mittelfeld 100.
- different revenue houses and single-family detached homes.
