= Königsallee (Düsseldorf) =

Boulevard in Düsseldorf, Germany

Coordinates: 51°13′23″N 6°46′45″E

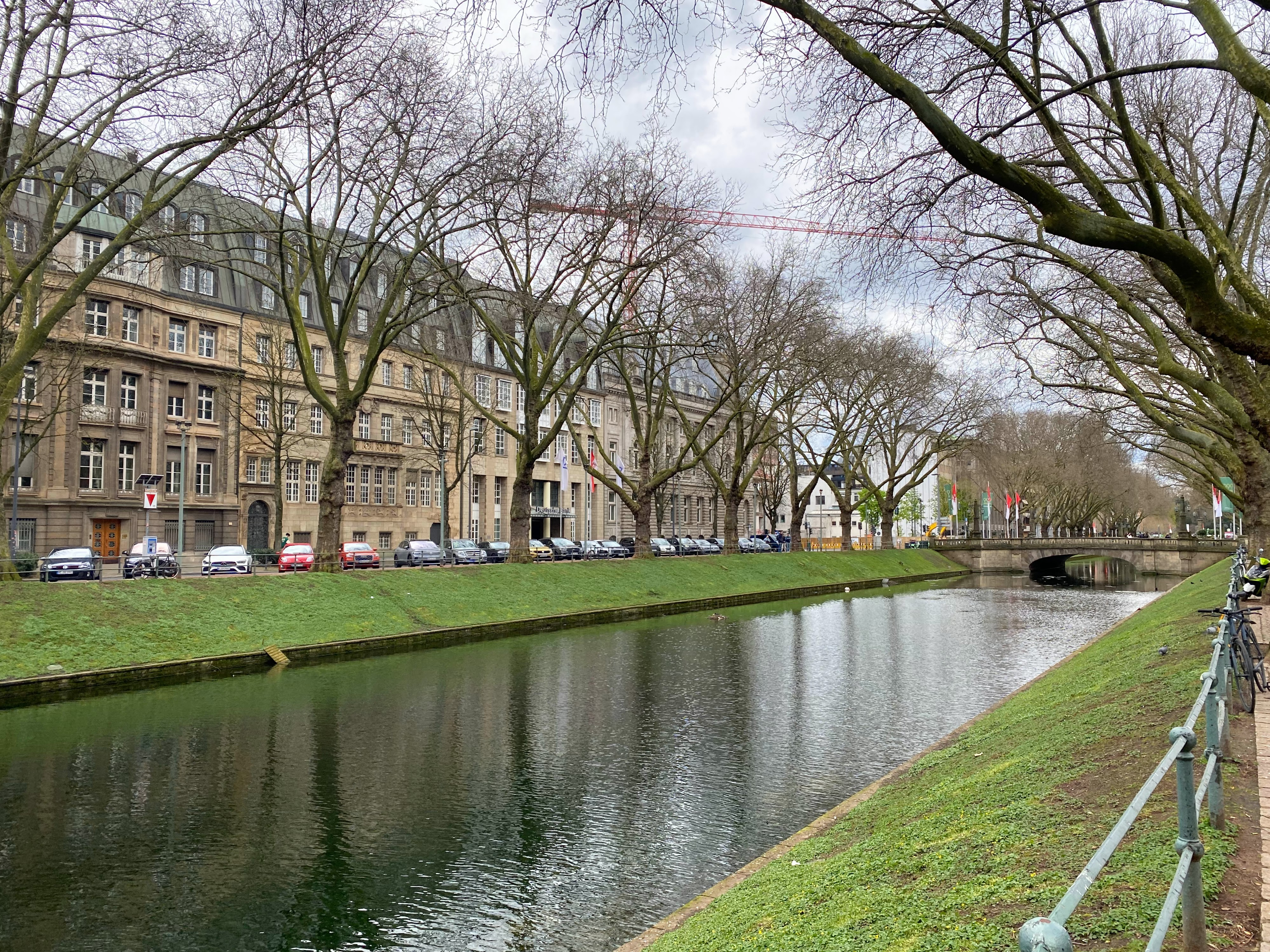
- View of the Königsallee's eastern side across the canal
- Interactive map of Königsallee
- Former names: Neue Allee, Mittelallee, Kastanienallee
- Length: 1,000 m (3,300 ft)
- Location: Stadtmitte, Düsseldorf, Germany
- Nearest metro station: Steinstraße/Königsallee
- North end: Elberfelder Straße
- Major junctions: Theodor-Körner-Straße—Schadowstraße; Benrather Straße—Steinstraße; Graf-Adolf-Straße—Bahnstraße
- South end: Luisenstraße

Construction
- Inauguration: 1804

Other
- Designer: Caspar Anton Huschberger

The Königsallee (German pronunciation: [ˈkøːnɪçsʔaˌleː]; literally "King's Avenue") is an urban boulevard in Düsseldorf, state capital of North Rhine-Westphalia, Germany. The Königsallee is noted for both the landscaped canal that runs along its center, as well as for the fashion showrooms and luxury retail stores located along its sides.

Nicknamed Kö (German pronunciation: [køː]) by locals, the Königsallee is one of Germany's busiest upscale shopping streets.

== Location ==
The Königsallee is some 1 km long and lies in the district of Stadtmitte. It stretches from Hofgarten, Düsseldorf's main park, to Carl-Theodor-Straße and Luisenstraße on its Southern end. At Hofgarten, the Königsallee reaches onto Landskrone, a peninsula of the park's lake. Adjacent to Königsallee are the Altstadt, Düsseldorf's old quarter, and Schadowstraße, Germany's shopping street with the highest sales revenues.

The canal is some 31 m wide and fed by water from the Düssel, from which the city got its name. The entire boulevard is some 80 metres (260 ft) wide and may be perceived as an urban esplanade. The Eastern side of Königsallee is entirely commercial, with numerous upmarket flagship stores and block-internal shopping arcades leading to and from the boulevard. Most of the Western side is quieter, given that it predominantly has offices, bank branches and hotels. Cafés and restaurants are located on both sides.

== History ==
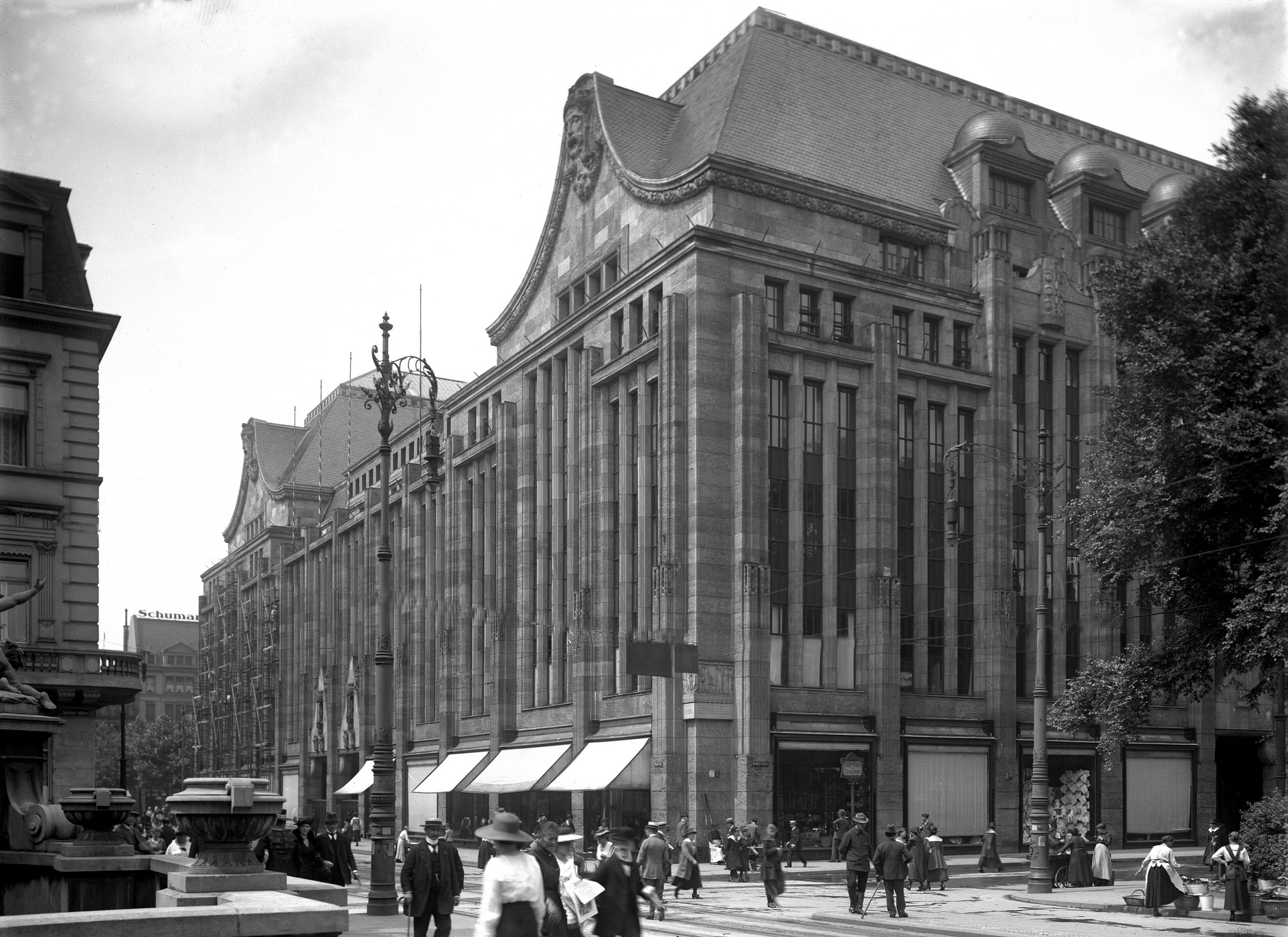
Warenhaus L. Tietz (1910)

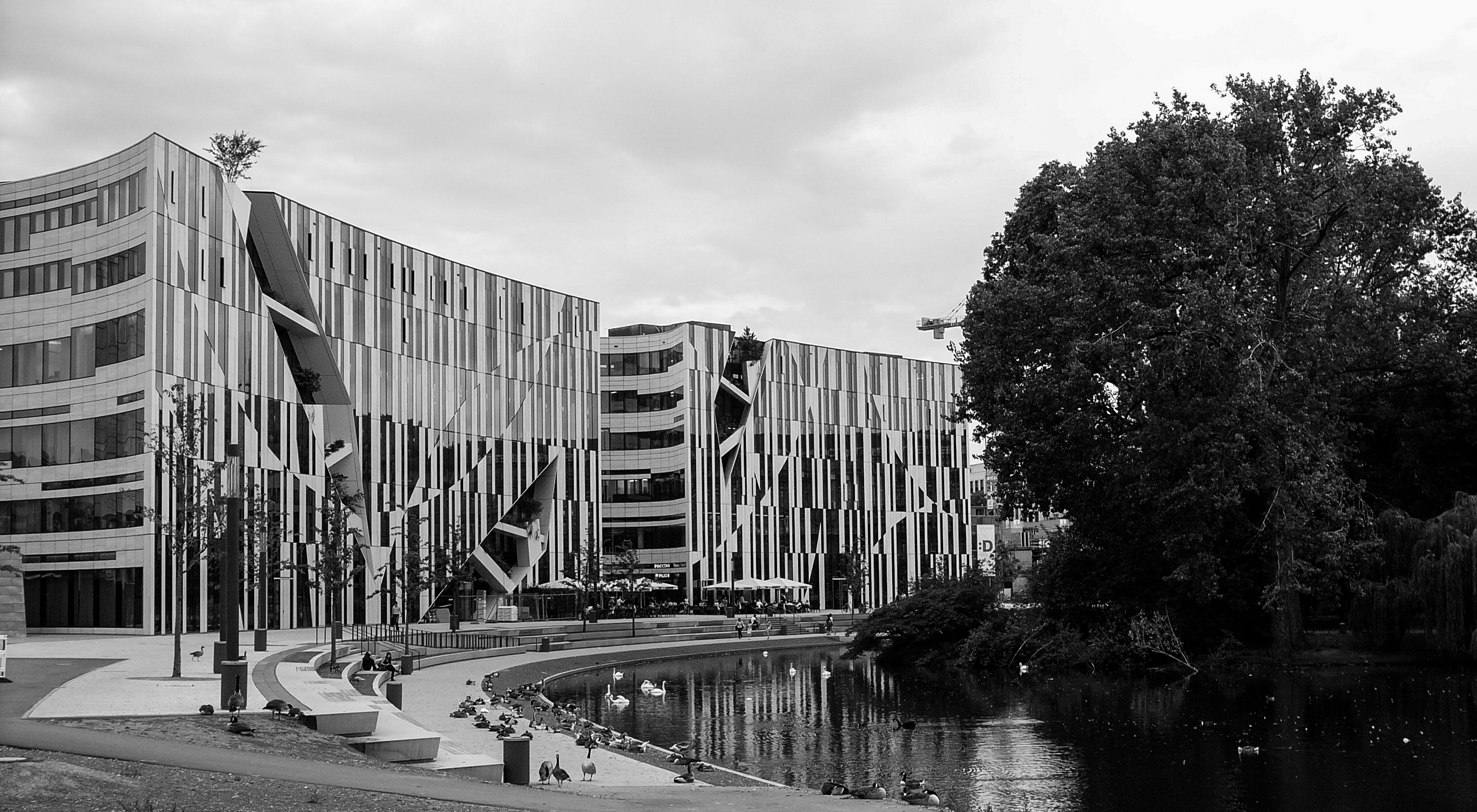
Kö-Bogen (2014)

By the end of the 18th century, Düsseldorf was a small Baroque town and capital of the Grand Duchy of Berg. Following the Treaty of Lunéville, the Duke was to have Düsseldorf's fortifications removed, which turned out to give room for a more generous urban plan. This plan included a Classicism esplanade, designed by architect to the court Caspar Anton Huschberger, in co-operation with landscape architect Maximilian Friedrich Weyhe and hydraulic engineer Wilhelm Gottlieb Bauer.

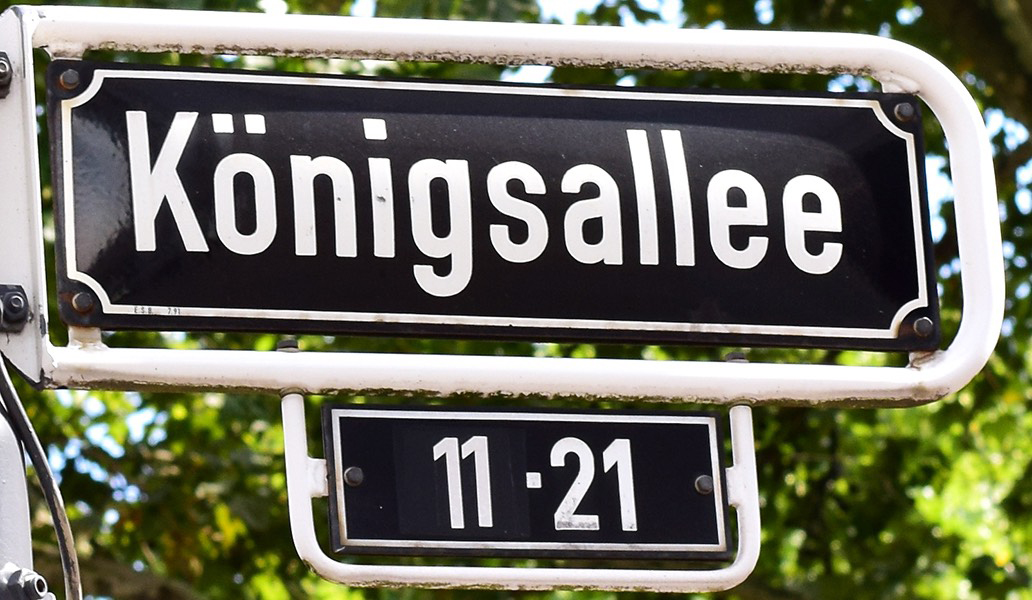
Königsallee street sign

The canal and boulevard were completed between 1802 and 1804. Hotel Breidenbacher Hof was opened in 1812; other buildings followed shortly after. The canal which runs through the center of the boulevard is 31 metres (102 ft) wide and up to 5 metres (16 ft) deep. The canal is fed by the Düssel, which was diverted to provide the necessary water. Two iron bridges cross the canal. On the suggestion of the landscape architect, Chestnut trees (German: Kastanien) were planted along the canal and the boulevard was therefore given the name "Kastanienallee" accordingly. After an incident in 1848, when horse manure was thrown at King Frederick William IV of Prussia, the street was renamed Königsallee (meaning King's Avenue) as a gesture of reconciliation.

Düsseldorf lost its independence to Prussia for most of the 19th and early 20th century, but the city remained an important international centre of the arts, and Königsallee its foremost boulevard. After 1946, Düsseldorf's new weight as state capital of the economically most powerful state of Germany, and the city's location at the heart of the largest metropolitan region in Germany, caused the German fashion industry to consolidate Düsseldorf as one of the world’s fashion capitals. An open-air fashion show on Königsallee initiated the first Igedo Fashion Fair in 1949, which over the years grew to become one of the world's largest fashion fairs. Since 1981 the biannual Düsseldorf Fashion Shows are held as Collection Premiers Düsseldorf (cpd) - primarily at Messe Düsseldorf Exhibition Centre, but showrooms are throughout the city.

During the Cold War, East German plans for the invasion of West Germany and German reunification under the German Democratic Republic foresaw that the street would be renamed Karl-Marx-Allee.

The Northeastern section has recently been redeveloped with a 40,000 m^{2} office and retail complex called Kö-Bogen, designed by architect Daniel Libeskind. The first sections were opened in 2014.

== Assortment ==
Many major designers have a presence on Königsallee, so that a roll call reads like a "who's who" of the international fashion industry. Products offered range from luxury fur coats to high-end electronics for audiophiles, and the gamut in between. The following list is an overview of some of the most notable stores. An extended scope and range of shops, brands and services goes on other nearby streets.

=== Stores ===
- Abercrombie & Fitch
- American Apparel
- Bally Shoes
- Barbara Frères
- Bose Corp.
- Bulgari
- Burberry
- Calvin Klein
- Cartier
- Chanel
- Comptoir de Cotonniers
- Eickhoff
- Ermenegildo Zegna
- Escada
- Esprit
- Etienne Aigner
- Giorgio Armani S.p.A.
- Gucci
- Guerreiro
- Harry Winston
- Herbert Stock
- Hermès
- Hugo Boss
- Jil Sander
- JOOP!
- Karen Millen
- Kiton
- Kookai
- Lacoste
- Laurèl
- Longchamp
- Loro Piana
- Louis Vuitton
- Massimo Dutti
- Max Azria
- Max Mara
- Marc O'Polo
- Philipp Plein
- Porsche Design
- Prada
- Salvatore Ferragamo Italia S.p.A.
- Swarovski
- Tiffany & Co.
- Tod's
- Tom Tailor
- United Colors of Benetton
- Villeroy & Boch
- Willy Bogner
- Zara

=== Hotels ===
- Breidenbacher Hof
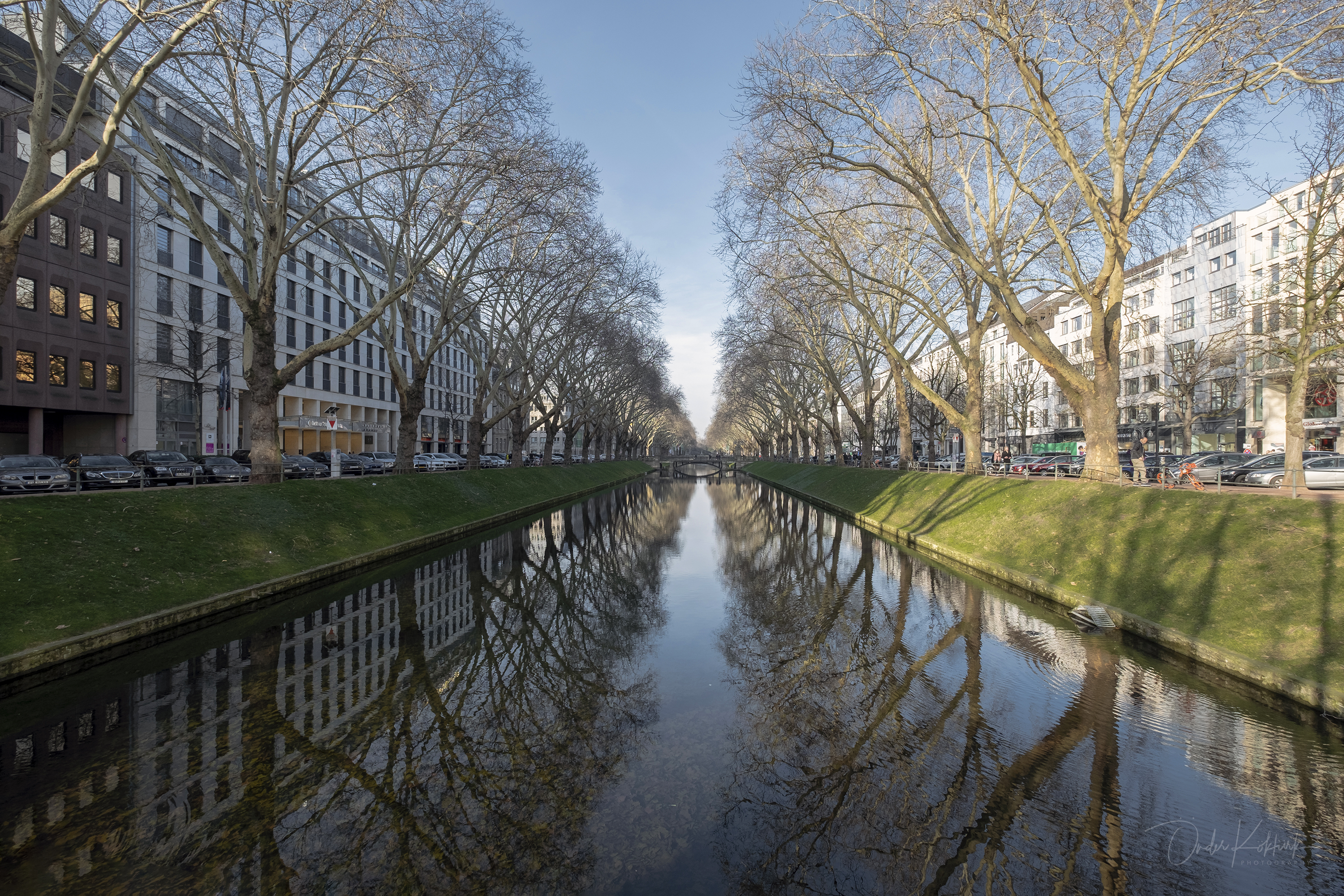
- Another view of Königsalle
  InterContinental
- Steigenberger Parkhotel

== In popular culture ==
The Königsallee is referred to in Herbert Grönemeyer's 1984 hit Bochum. The singer compares it to the Königsallee in Bochum (an unimpressive thoroughfare) and infers that "big money" counts in Düsseldorf, but "the heart" in Bochum.

== Places of interest nearby ==
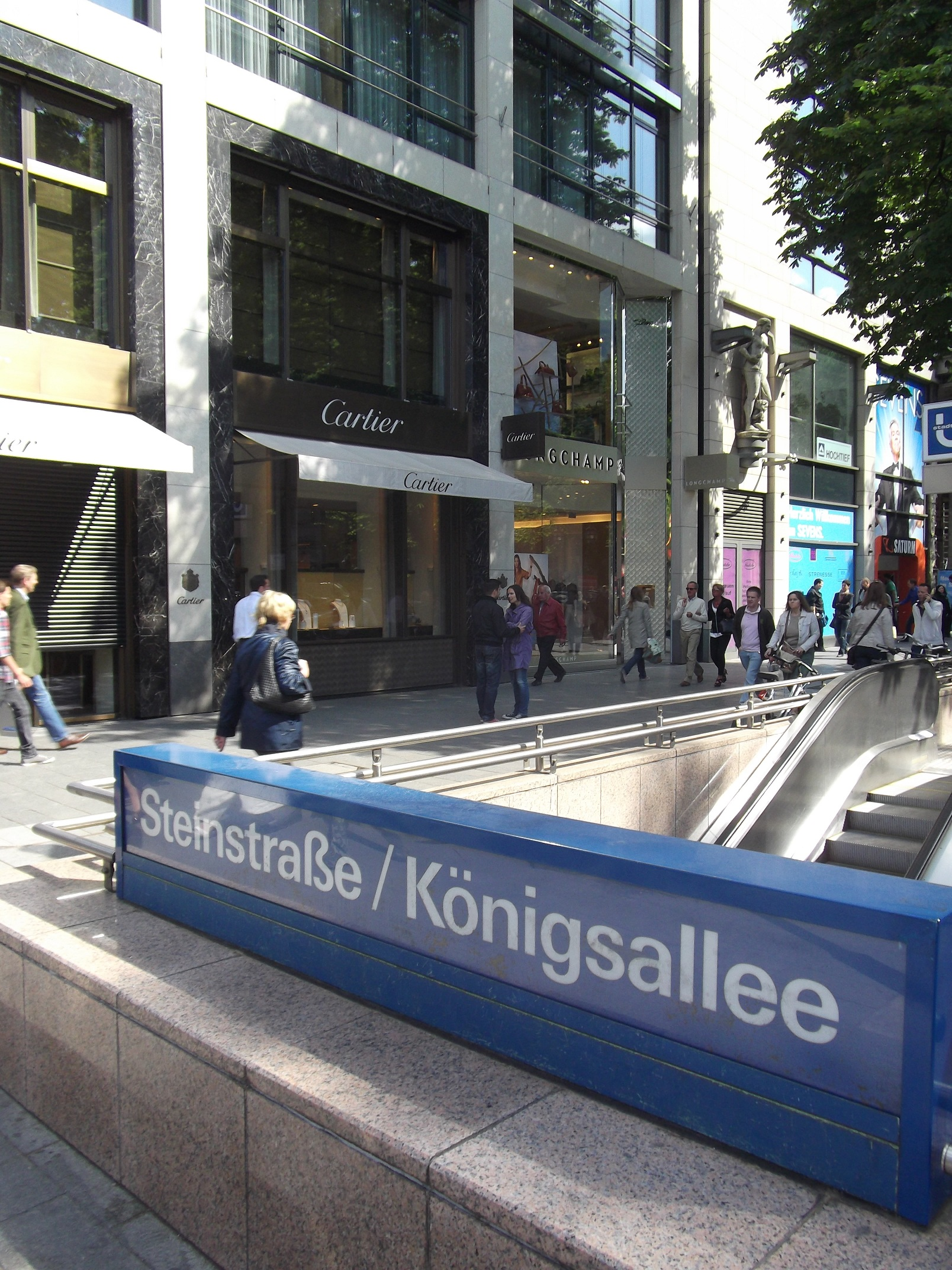
Entrance to the U-Bahn station of Steinstraße/Königsallee

- Düsseldorfer Schauspielhaus, theater
- Deutsche Oper am Rhein, opera house
- Kunstsammlung Nordrhein-Westfalen K20 and K21
- stilwerk Düsseldorf

== See also ==
- District 1, Düsseldorf
- NRW Forum
- List of leading shopping streets and districts by city
- List of canals in Germany
