= Schauspielhaus Bad Godesberg =

German theatre

Coordinates: 50°41′00″N 7°09′14″E

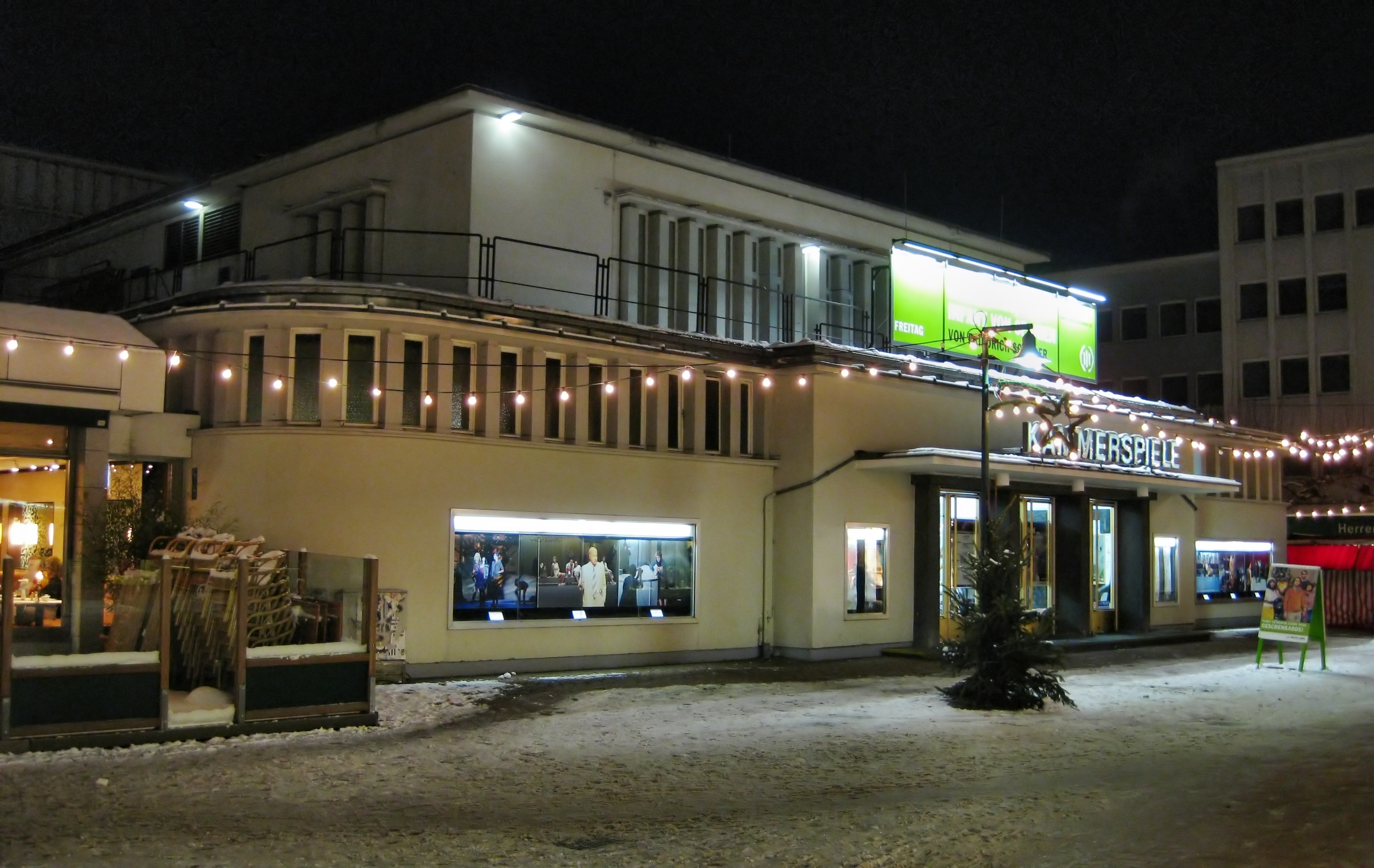
The entrance to the Schauspielhaus (then still "Kammerspiele") seen from Theaterplatz, 2010

The Schauspielhaus Bad Godesberg (formerly "Kammerspiele Bad Godesberg") is the largest theatre in the city of Bonn and the first new theatre building in the Federal Republic of Germany in the post-war period. The building was constructed in the Bad Godesberg city centre in the early 1950s. It now belongs to the Alt-Godesberg district of Bonn and is located at Theaterplatz 9 / Am Michaelshof 9 (originally Friedrich-Ebert-Straße, since 1956 Michaelstraße 9, today Am Michaelshof 9); it is under Denkmalschutz.

== History ==
Although Bad Godesberg had hardly been destroyed in the Second World War, the provision of housing for refugees and federal employees who had moved there placed a considerable burden on the budget of the town, which had not yet been incorporated into Bonn at the time, in the post-war period. For lack of sufficient funds, the city administration decided in the early 1950s to first build a modern theatre building instead of the city hall, which was also needed. This building, known as the Stadttheater, was the first new theatre building in the Federal Republic of Germany after the war. It was built according to plans by the Düsseldorf architect Ernst Huhn under the direction of the municipal building authority within eight months in 1951/52.

On 28 March 1952, the theatre was festively opened with a performance of the magic flute. Federal President Theodor Heuss was present and had the building's modern stage and cinema technology explained to him during a tour. The picture and sound system had been supplied by the Düsseldorf UFA trading company; the other equipment included two Ernemann-X projectors of right-hand design with attached slide equipment, arc lamp rectifiers of 75 amps each and a sound film rack amplifier system of type MX with reserve amplifier. The auditorium originally had 738 seats; the seating was supplied by Schröder & Henzelmann from Bad Oeynhausen. The theatre space was dominated by grey and green tones.

The theatre's first director was Ernst Rademacher, followed by Fritz Kucht and Josef Loschelder.

The theatre was operated by guest ensembles and was also – for better utilisation – to be run as a cinema according to a council decision from 1951. Several phases of reconstruction followed, in 1962 the theatre was temporarily closed for renovation and in 1967 the audience capacity was reduced to 684 seats.

Just as the federal government financially supported many of Bonn's and Bad Godesberg's institutions, the Godesberg city administration also received subsidies for the operation of the municipal theatre. According to an agreement from 1970, 58.7 % of the theatre's loss compensation was taken over by the federal government. Thanks to the efforts of the members of the Bundestag Hugo Hauser and Horst Ehmke, the federal subsidy for the maintenance costs was even increased to 70 % in 1980. In 1986, structural adjustments were made to the building as part of its incorporation into the umbrella organisation Theater Bonn – since then known as Kammerspiele. In 2008, the city financed new seating; today it seats 473 spectators. In 2008, the Bonn city council placed the theatre under a preservation order. The scope of protection concerns the exterior building and the box office hall. The workshop hall adjoining the building is not protected.

=== Renaming ===
The new acting director Jens Groß, who was hired in 2018, suggested renaming the Godesberg Kammerspiele to "Schauspielhaus". This was implemented at the start of the 2018/2019 season and celebrated with the annual theatre festival on 9 September 2018. The festival has so far taken place in and in front of the Bonn Opera House.

=== Discussions about closing the theatre ===
The closure and change of use of the theatre building has been regularly discussed since 2006. In 2014, Lord Mayor Jürgen Nimptsch pleaded for the abandonment of the Bad Godesberg theatre as a municipal venue. The city administration proposed to the city council that plays be staged in the Bonn Opera in the future. In addition to the high running costs, upcoming renovation costs in the Godesberg house for stage technology and electrics amounting to several million euros were referred to as justification. The costs alone for the necessary renovation of the stage machinery were estimated at around two million euros. Some of the high costs for transporting sets and scenery between the depot on the grounds of Halle Beuel, the house in Bad Godesberg and the opera house on the banks of the Rhine could also be avoided if the two were merged.

In 2015, it was then decided to make the Godesberg House the central venue for plays in Bonn. The municipal theatre, which until now played in the Halle Beuel, has since used the Schauspielhaus in Bad Godesberg. It had to leave the Beueler Halle to make room there for the performances of the Pantheon-Theater, which was not financed by the city and which in turn had to move out of the Bonn-Center to be demolished. The Schauspielhaus thus received a guarantee of continued existence beyond 2018.

== Architecture ==
The building, measuring around 30 metres × 70 metres, extends along the street Am Michaelshof to the Theaterplatz, where it has its main entrance and which it dominates by its appearance. The building, covered with a flat roof, is staggered in different heights, depending on the use of the individual building components. The imposing storefront is designed with bands of narrow, highly rectangular, slit-like windows. The corners of the building are rounded.

The justification for the application for protection as a monument read:

- The staggered theatre building with flat roofs is characteristic of the construction method and formal design of a progressive architectural concept of the post-war period.
