= Adolf Falke =

German architect

Adolf Falke (28 January 1888 in Brome – 6 June 1958) was a German architect, draughtsman, designer, stage designer and municipal politician.

== Life ==
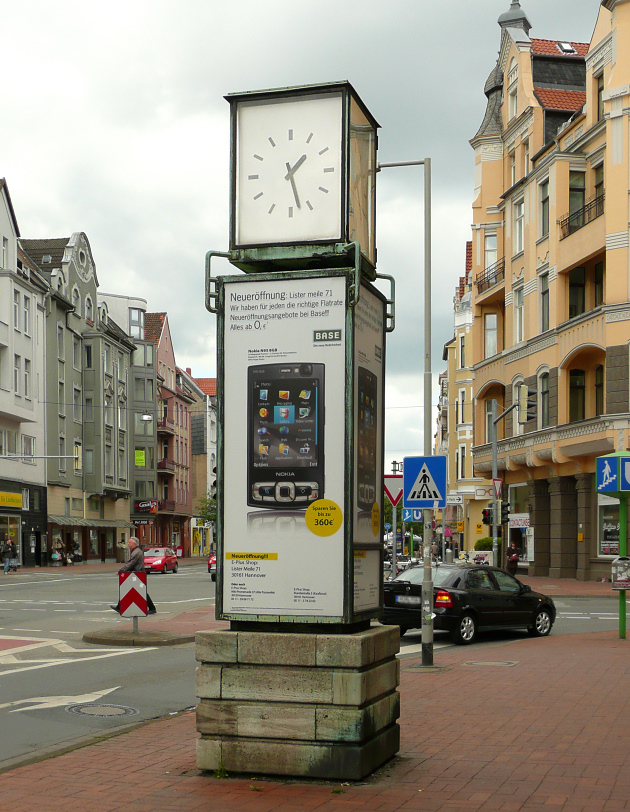
One of the ten preserved futurist "Falke-Uhren" in Hanover, here at Lister Platz

After attending a village school near Gifhorn, Falke contracted polio at the age of eight, which resulted in a shortened leg as a lifelong disability. However, the cantor of the village school supported him and enabled Falke to attend the Leibnizschule Hannover. After his Abitur in 1910, Falke studied architecture at the Gottfried-Wilhelm-Leibniz-Universität Hannover and at the Technical University of Munich from 1910 to 1914. In Hanover, he became a member of the Bauhütte zum Weißen Blatt. Because of his walking disability, he was not drafted as a soldier during World War I, but was able to work as an employee in the construction office of the Keksfabrik Bahlsen with the sculptor and architect Bernhard Hoetger on the plans for Bahlsen's TET-Stadt.

From 1919, Falke ran his own architectural practice and was appointed as a member of the Bund Deutscher Architekten in 1920. In his office, Falke taught the later architect Hans Klüppelberg how to draw, from which a lifelong friendship developed. The later Stadtbaurat Rudolf Hillebrecht also wanted to design in a "modern" way and therefore, after his studies, initially worked for Falke from 15 August 1933 to 15 February 1934, from which a paternal-friendship relationship developed.

In 1926, Falke won the competition for a so-called "standard clock": according to his futurism type design, the city of Hanover placed around 20 "Falke-Uhr" in the city. Even today, of the listed buildings "Reklameuhren", ten copies are exposed in various locations in Hanover.

Around 1930, Falke was decisively involved in the construction of the housing estate Liststadt in Hanover. This is acknowledged on a city plaque. During the Third Reich, however, Falke was Berufsverbot by the Reich Chamber of Culture in 1937, as he was married to the Jewish Therese Danziger. Nevertheless, he was able to continue working secretly, and was rewarded for this with publicly invisible commissions from former clients and friends.

As early as September 1945, Falke was commissioned by the British military government to prepare an association of architects. After a good year, the Bund Deutscher Architekten (Association of German Architects), which had been brought into line by the Nazis in 1934, was re-founded in Lower Saxony on 1 November 1946, and Falke held its chair until 1956. In addition, Falke was a member of the Expert Advisory Board ("Baupflege-Beirat") of the city of Hanover. The former councillor Falke fulfilled his former pupil Rudolf Hillebrecht's wish for a letter of recommendation for the British military authorities and thereby played a decisive role in Hillebrecht's further career.

During the reconstruction of the Café Kröpcke as a provisional building for the Export Messe 1947, Falke was one of the participants in a limited architectural competition, which was finally won in 1948 by the design of Dieter Oesterlen.

Falke worked until the last year of his life. He died at age 70 and was buried at the Stadtfriedhof Nackenberg.

== Honours ==
- In 1999, the city of Hanover honoured Falke by naming a newly created street in Kirchrode as Adolf-Falke-Weg.

== Realisations ==
Falke not only designed commercial buildings, but also furniture, lamps and jewellery. In addition, he created stage designs for the Kestnergesellschaft and the Schauspiel Hannover. The following are known of his works:

- until 1919: Involvement in the planned "Bahlsen" project. TET-Stadt with Bernhard Hoetger.
- 1922/1923: Warehouse for Ferdinand Sichel in Hanover.
- 1926: Garage for Daimler-Benz in Hanover.
- 1926: Interior design of a sales shop for the Bahlsen compagny on Kurfürstendamm in Berlin.
- 1926: siegreicher Wettbewerbsentwurf für eine Normal- bzw. Reklameuhr in Hannover (Typenentwurf der so genannten „Falke-Uhren“).
- 1929: Housing group at the Karl-Peters-Platz in Hanover.
- 1929–1931: Residential development of the Liststadt in Hanover, between the Podbielskistraße and the Defreggerstraße. on the site of the TET City formerly planned there.; with artists' studios, which then for example Grethe Jürgens used.

From 1948 onwards, Falke built various commercial buildings in the centre of Hanover, including:

- Commercial building for Hans Westermann KG in the Karmarschstraße.
- 1949: Reconstruction of the Head office of the Sachse & Heinzelmann bookshop, Georgstraße/Windmühlenstraße
- Commercial building Knoop.

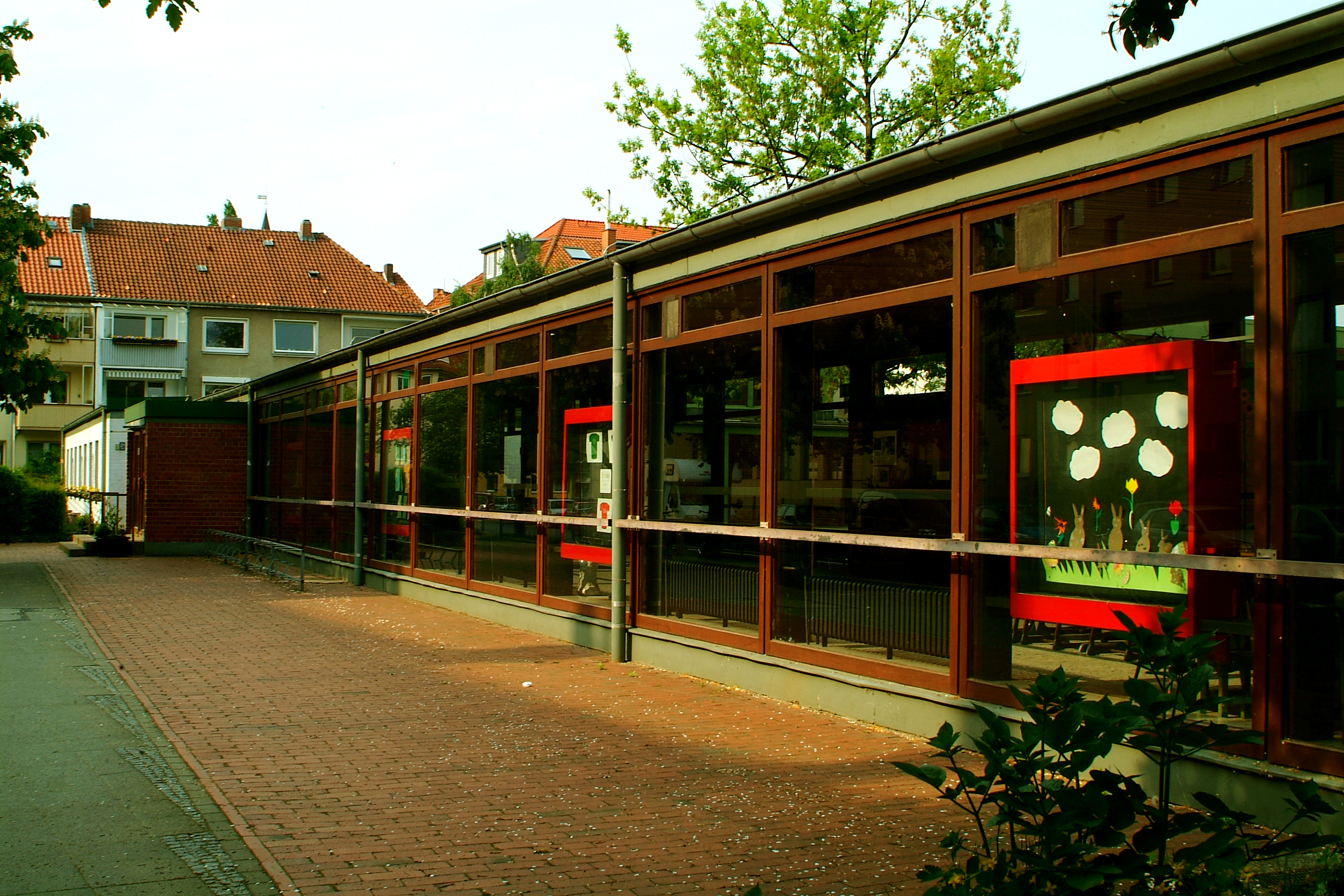
Connecting tract of the Grundschule Meterstraße in Hannover Südstadt

- Commercial building for the Villa Heutelbeck fashion house.
- 1951: Falke's own home in the Schopenhauerstraße in Hanover.
- 1951: Commercial building for the I. G. von der Linde lingerie and fashion business.
- 1952: jüdisches Altersheim in Hanover.
- 1953: Buchhandlung Schmorl & von Seefeld in Hannover, Bahnhofstraße 14.
- 1957: Commercial building for the Hannoversche Presse.
- 1957: Design of a synagogue for Hanover.
- 1958: Draft for the Grundschule Meterstraße in Hanover (together with Rudolf Klein, Ausführung 1959–1960).
