= Eickhoff =

The surname Eickhoff may refer to:

- Anthony Eickhoff, journalist, editor, author, lawyer
- Bennet Eickhoff (born 1995), German footballer
- Frauke Eickhoff, German judoka
- Gottfred Eickhoff, sculptor
- Jerad Eickhoff (born 1990), American baseball player
