= Internationales Essener Pop & Blues Festival =

1969 music festival in Germany

The Internationales Essener Pop & Blues Festival was a three-day music festival held 9–11 October 1969 at the Grugahalle in Essen, Germany. Some of the artists that performed included Fleetwood Mac, Yes, Free, Deep Purple, Pink Floyd, Muddy Waters, Champion Jack Dupree, the Pretty Things and Tangerine Dream.
