= Grugahalle =

Multi-purpose hall in Essen, Germany

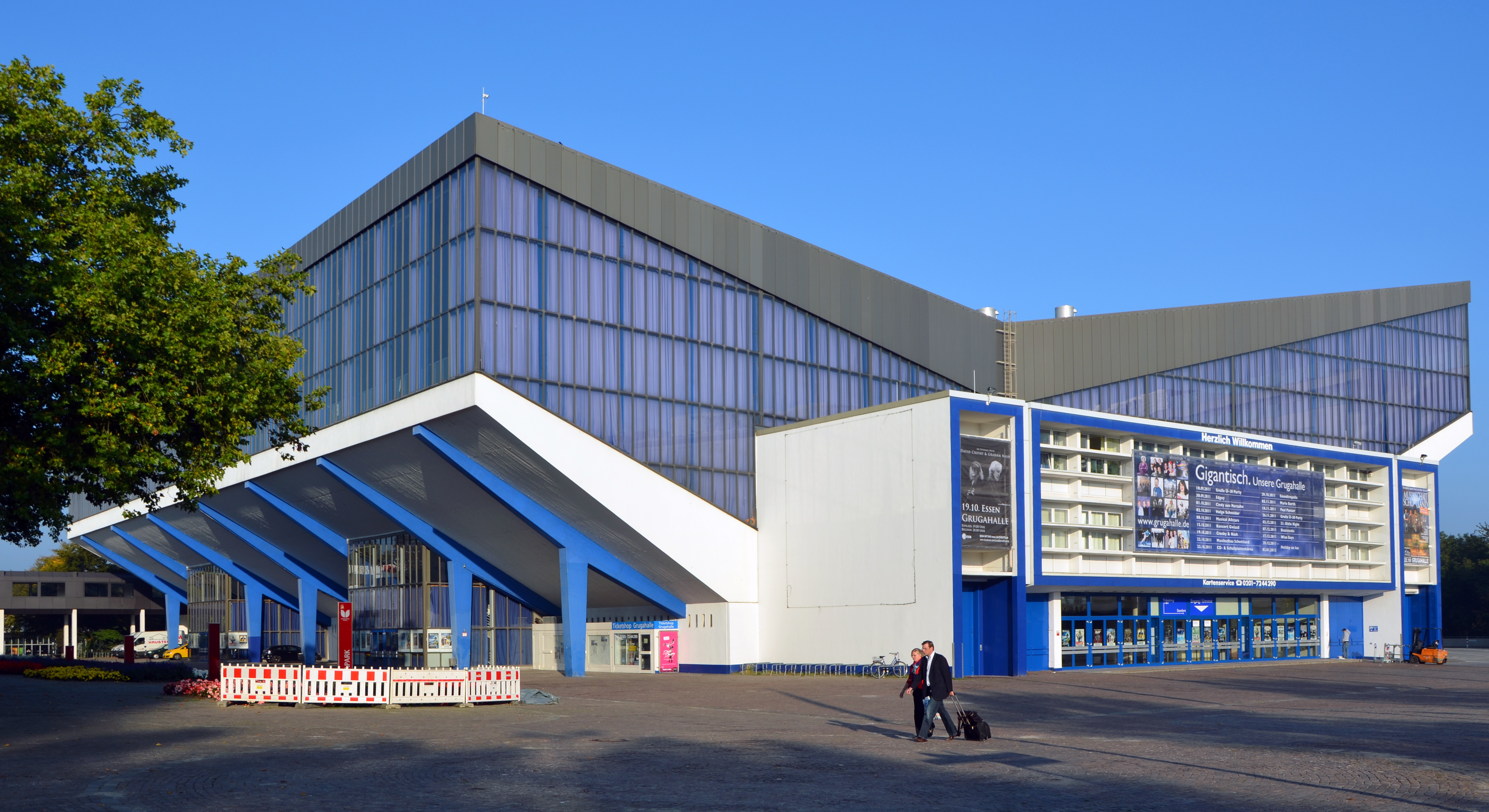

- Location within North Rhine-Westphalia
- Address: Messeplatz 2 Essen; Germany
- Coordinates: 51°25′52″N 6°59′52″E
- Operator: Messe Essen GmbH
- Capacity: 7700 (seated), 10,000 (unseated)
- Type: Arena
- Events: Concerts, sporting events, political events, AGMs

Construction
- Groundbreaking: October 1956
- Opened: 25 October 1958
- Renovated: 1995
- Architects: Ernst Friedrich Brockmann, Gerd Lichtenhahn

Website
- Grugahalle.de

The Grugahalle is a multi-purpose indoor arena located at the edge of the Botanischer Garten Grugapark in Essen, Germany. Opened on 25 October 1958, its seating capacity is about 7,700 people and about 10,000 for unseated events. The building was heritage-listed in 2000.

The Grugahalle is the venue for concerts, sport events, political rallies, annual general meetings of large companies, and live screenings of significant sport events. Notable past events include the concert of Bill Haley and accompanying riots three days after the hall's opening. The Essener Jazztage (Essen Jazz Days) from 1959 to 1961 brought international performers like Ella Fitzgerald, Oscar Peterson, and the Dave Brubeck Quartet to the city. Later, The Beatles, The Rolling Stones, The Beach Boys, Led Zeppelin, The Who, Status Quo, Rush, ABBA, The Grateful Dead and many other groups included the Grugahalle in their tours. Frank Zappa and The Mothers of Invention gave their first concert in Germany there in front of an audience of 13,000 during the Internationale Essener Songtage in 1968. This was followed in 1969 by the Internationales Essener Pop & Blues Festival which included Fleetwood Mac, Yes, Free, Deep Purple, Pink Floyd, Muddy Waters, Champion Jack Dupree, the Pretty Things, Queen and Tangerine Dream.

In September 1971, the Grugahalle was the venue for most of the games of the 1971 European basketball championship. In November 1987, the World Judo Championships were conducted there. Several handball clubs, including TUSEM Essen, used the hall for their home games from 1970 to 2005.

The Grugahalle was the main venue for the 82nd Katholikentag in September 1968, and in 1969 for the convention of the German Communist Party. Later that year, Willy Brandt, Helmut Schmidt, and Franz Josef Strauß held rallies for the 1969 West German federal election. In 1994 the European Council summit convened there.
