= Hannover Concerts =

German concert agency

Hannover Concerts is a concert agency from Hanover. The company is considered one of the largest concert promoters in northern Germany.

== History ==
Hannover Concerts was founded in 1979 (Note: Other sources: 1978) by Michael Lohmann and Wolfgang Besemer, who died in 2014. In the same year, the agency's first concert took place in the Kuppelsaal in Hanover. In 1982, the agency brought the Rolling Stones to Hanover, beating Hamburg. The concert by the English rock band was also the first open-air concert in the old Niedersachsenstadion.

In 1986, Lohmann and Besemer converted the Capitol from a cinema into a concert and party venue. In 2001, the concept of an open-air stage, the Gilde Parkbühne Hannover, was created, and in 2005, the agency took over the Stadionsporthalle, today's Swiss Life Hall, where the company's headquarters are also located. During the Football World Cup 2006, the agency hosted the public and private screening at Waterlooplatz.

== Activities ==
The agency organises more than 400 events annually and operates, among others, the Theater am Aegi, the Capitol, the Gilde Parkbühne Hannover and the Swiss Life Hall. Until 2016, Hannover Concerts was responsible for concerts and catering at the Löwenbastion at the Maschseefest. Supra-regional activities include the Papenburg Festival on the grounds of the Meyer Werft shipyard in Papenburg, the Mercedes Benz Open-Air in Bremen and other open-air concerts in Rostock, Wolfsburg, Hildesheim or Braunschweig.

Performances organised by Hannover Concerts have included Genesis, Michael Jackson, Marius Müller-Westernhagen, Tina Turner, Madonna, Pink Floyd Coldplay, Bruce Springsteen, U2, AC/DC, Rammstein, Guns n' Roses, Eminem, Helene Fischer, Depeche Mode, Pink, David Guetta and Robbie Williams.

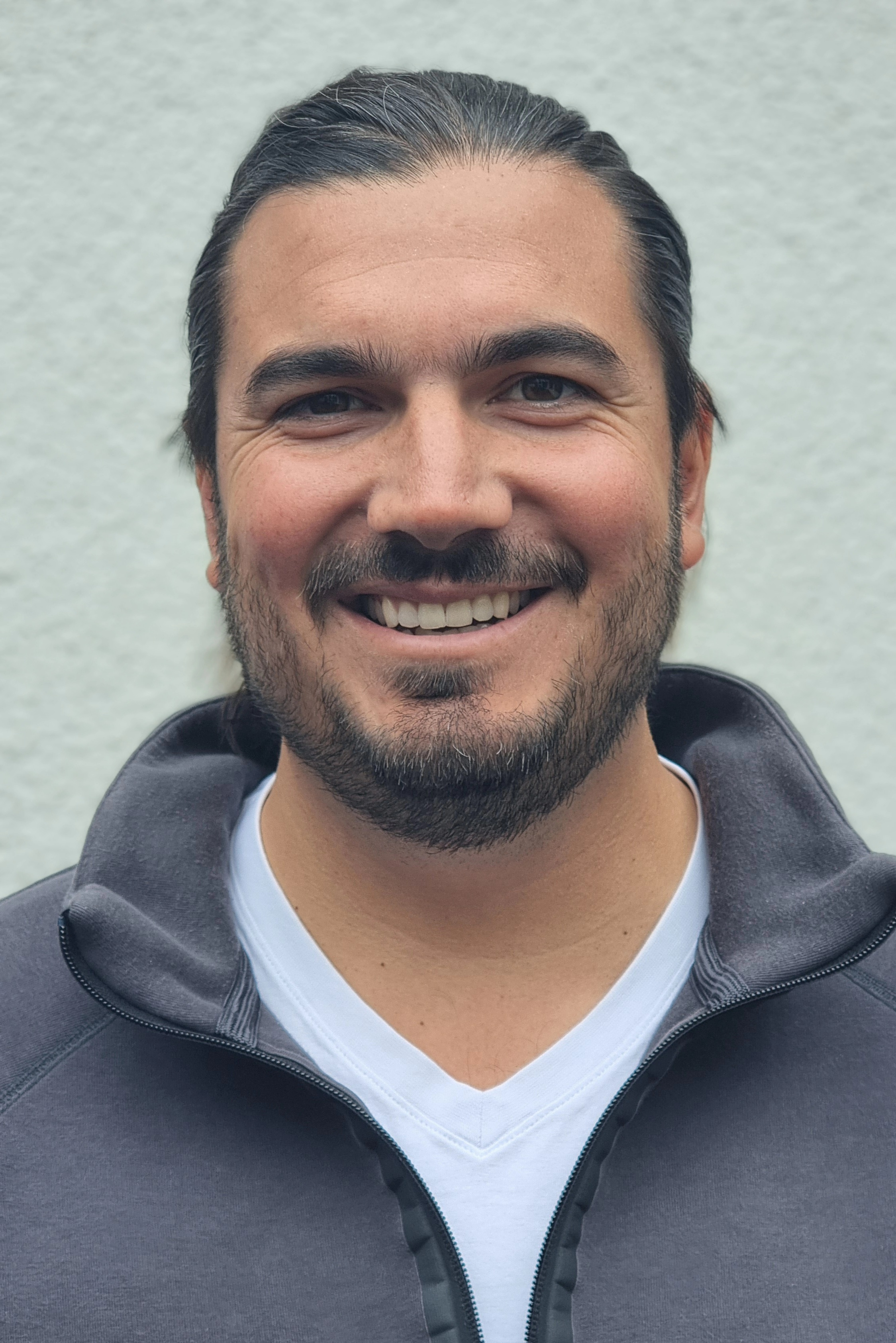
Managing director Nico Röger

In 2014, Nico Röger joined the management after the unexpected death of Wolfgang Besemer. In June 2018, there was an expansion of the management with Benjamin Chatton.
