= Gerd Lichtenhahn =

German architect (1910–1964)

Gerd Otto Lichtenhahn (15 January 1910 – 21 August 1964) was a German architect and member of the Association of German Architects (BDA).

== Life and realisations ==
Born in Essen, Lichtenhahn was the son of the architect Karl August Lichtenhahn, who was employed by the city of Essen. The father enabled him (as well as the younger daughter Renate) after attending a secondary school and an arts and crafts school in Basel (both children had Swiss citizenship), from 25 September 1925 he began attending the Untersekunda (UII, 10th grade) of the reform educational Landerziehungsheim Schule am Meer on the East Frisian Islands Juist, from which he left on 18 July 1926 without graduating, to continue his school career there from 14 January 1927. On 24 January 1929, he left there prematurely without graduating, the school-leaving examinations took place annually in March.

He later studied architecture and lived and worked in Hanover. There he was responsible in an architectural partnership with Ernst Friedrich Brockmann for the construction of the Europahalle, built in 1950, and the Leuchtenhochhaus and the Elektrohalle, completed in 1958, all on the Hannover Fairground.

Together with Ernst Brockmann, Lichtenhahn won the architectural competition to build the Grugahalle in Essen, which was completed in 1958. He maintained his own office in Essen for this purpose. His further designs contributed to the Gruga expansion with regard to the Bundesgartenschau 1965 there. This included in particular the construction of the Grugabad which he planned independently and which was opened in 1964. His designs also included the Hövel primary school in Essen-Altenessen.

Essen's Gildenplatz - renamed Kennedyplatz in 1963 in memory of the assassinated US president - was redesigned according to Lichtenhahn's plans and featured an elongated, terraced fountain on its eastern long side (demolished in 1989). He also designed several residential buildings on Lanterstraße in Essen-Bergerhausen.

Lichtenhahn died in Hanover at the age of 54.

== Buildings and drafts ==
- 1950: Europahalle on the Hanover Fairground (with Ernst Brockmann).
- 1953: Theater am Aegi (with Hans Klüppelberg).
- 1953: durch die British Zone freigegebene, dann durch Lichtenhahn und Hans Klüppelberg umgebaute und erweiterte Maschseegaststätte in Hannover
- 1955: Mietswohnhäuser Riepestraße 1–8 and Hildesheimer Straße 220/212 in Hanover (with Hans Klüppelberg).
- 1955: Geschäftsgebäude im Steintorblock in Hanover (with Hans Klüppelberg).
- 1956: Verwaltungsgebäude der Philips Deutschland, Volgersweg/Ecke Hinüberstraße in Hannover (with Hans Klüppelberg).
- 1956: Kleiderfabrik Odermark in Goslar (with Ernst Brockmann).
- 1958 Leuchtenhochhaus and Elektrohalle auf dem Messegelände Hannover (with the architects Ernst Brockmann, Fr. Hüper and E. Teerling).
- 1958: Grugahalle in Essen (with Ernst Brockmann)
- 1960er Jahre: Gestaltung Kennedyplatz in Essen
- 1964: Grugabad in Essen
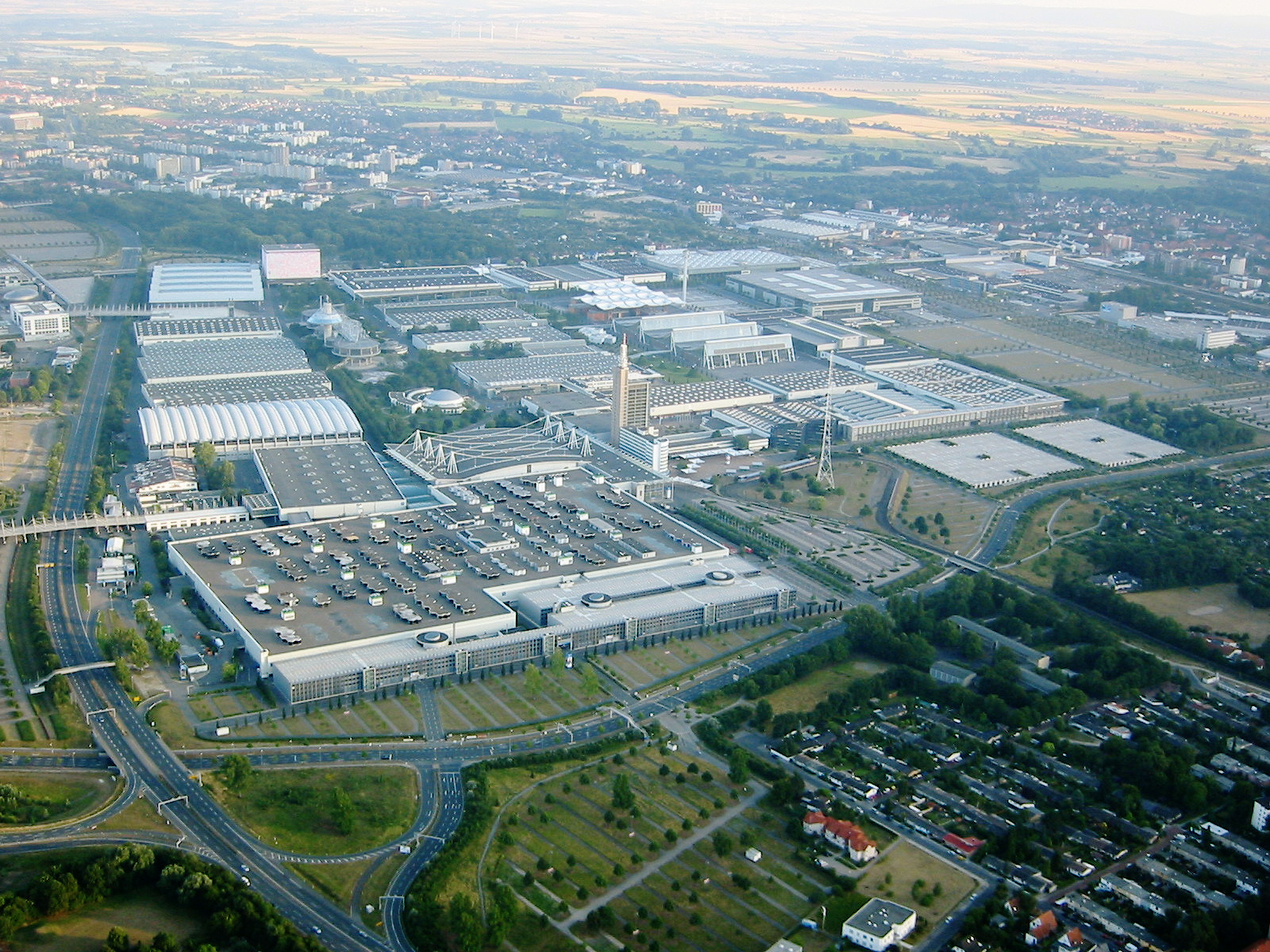
Hanover Fairground

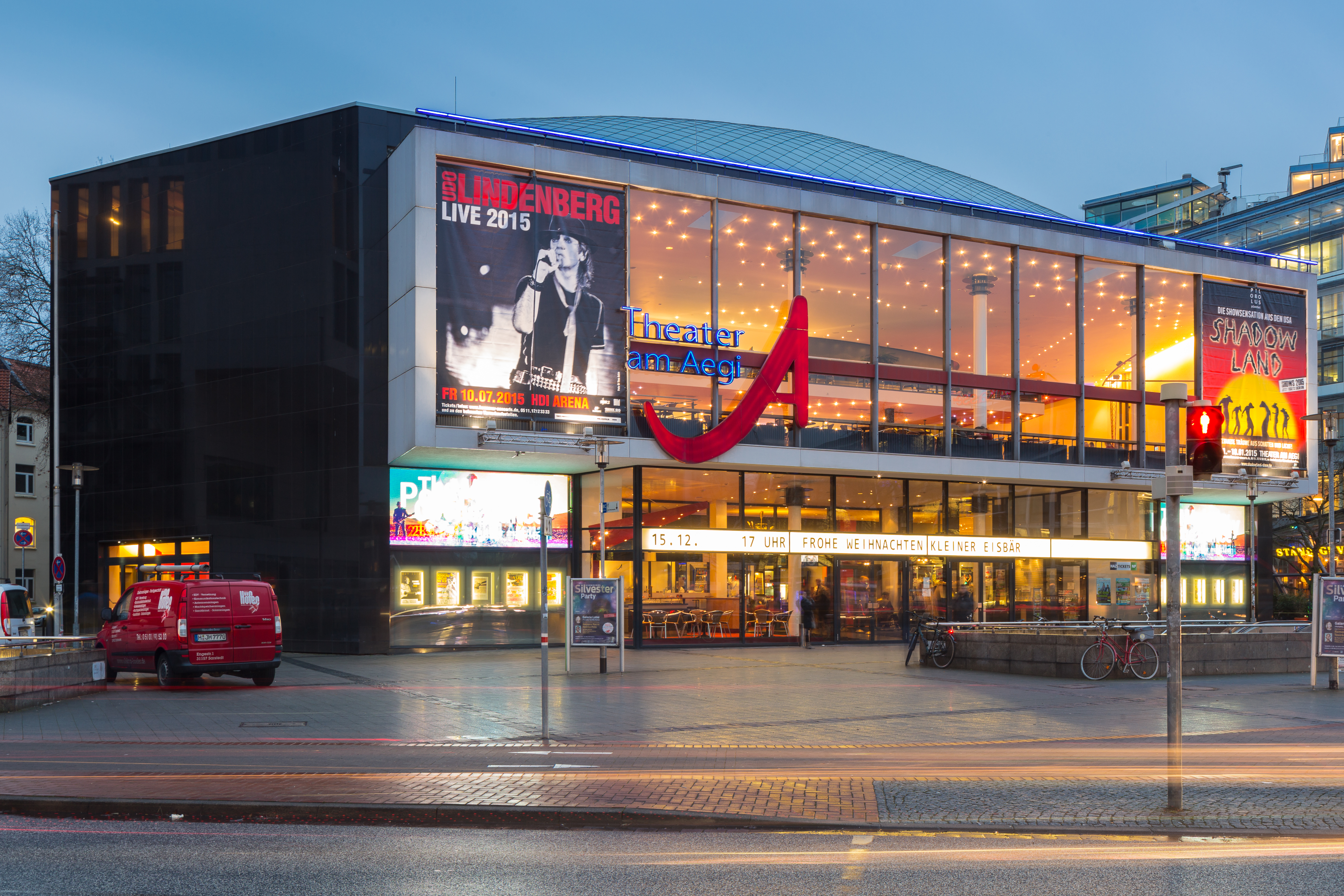
Theater am Aegi in Hanover

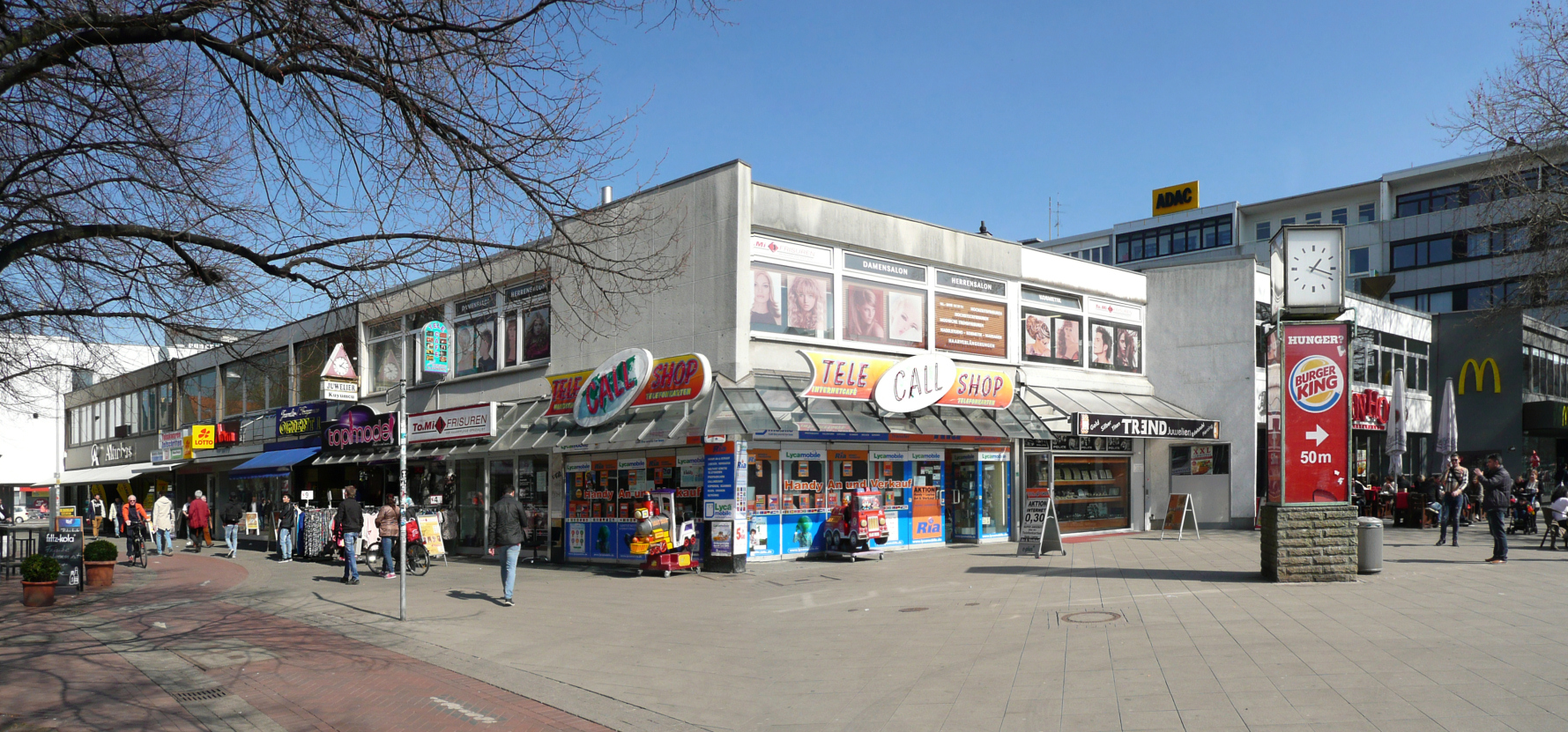
Building in Steintorblock in Hanover

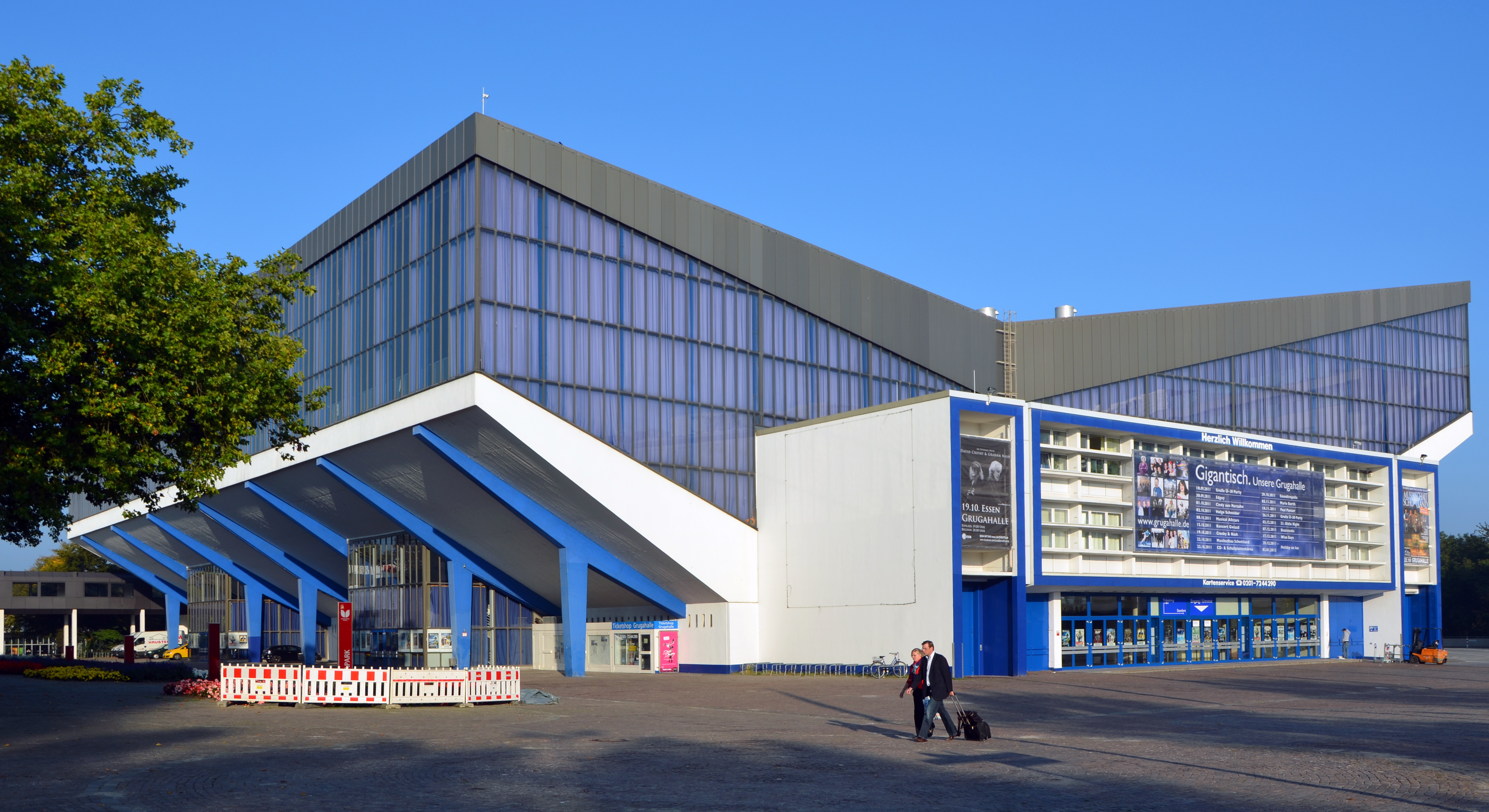
Grugahalle in Essen

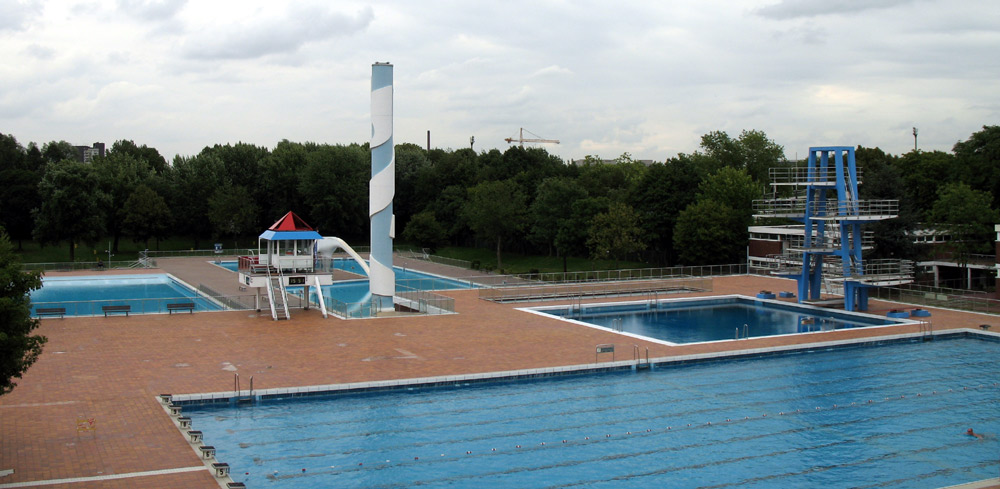
Grugabad in Essen

== Awards ==
- In 1954, Lichtenhahn was honoured with the Laves-Plakette for the construction of the Europahalle, which he had built in 1950 together with Ernst Brockmann on the (present-day) Hanover Fairground.
