= Rudolf Hillebrecht =

German architect and city planner (1910–1999)

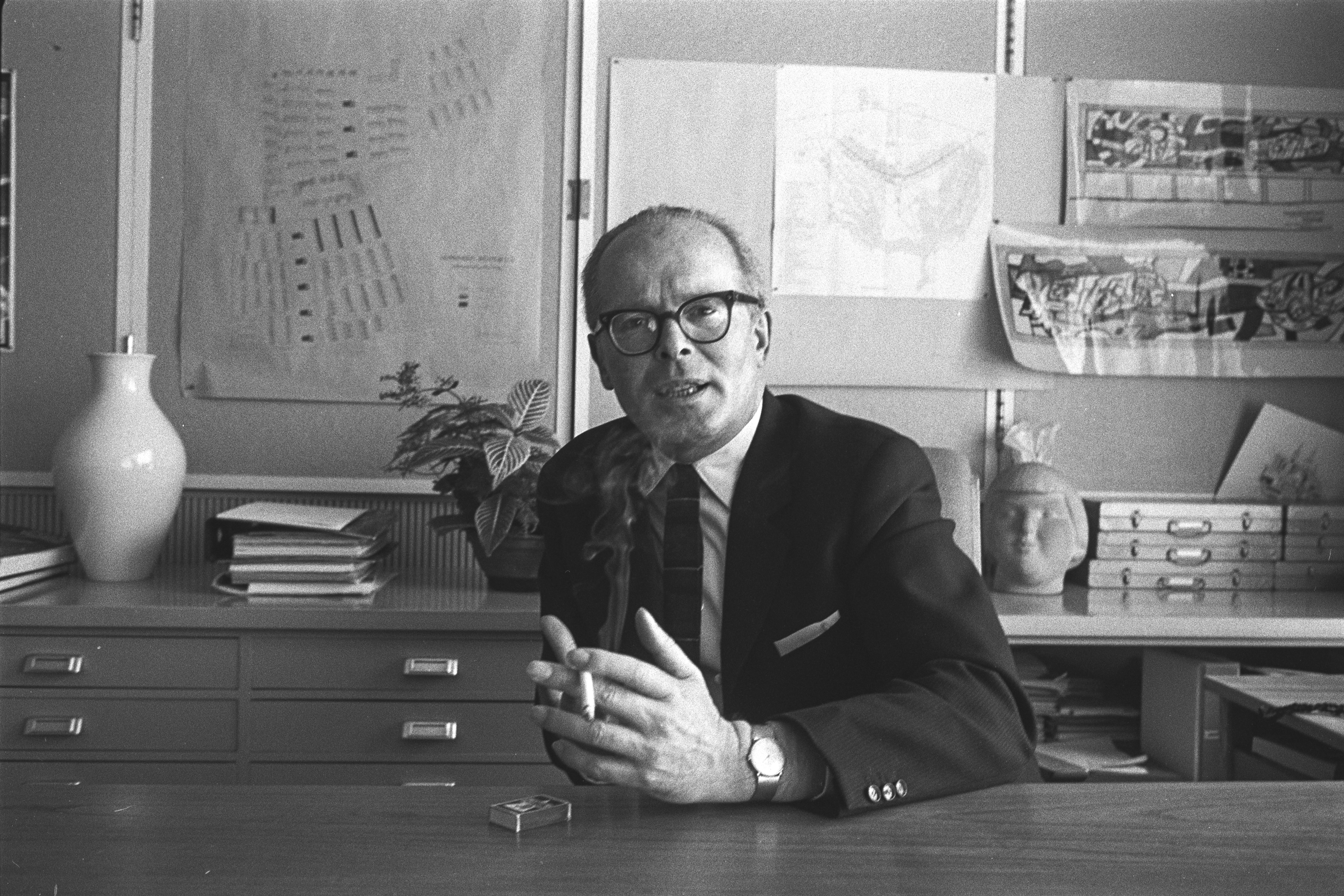
- Hillebrecht in 1962
- Born: 26 February 1910; Hannover-Linden, Province of Hanover, Kingdom of Prussia, Germany
- Died: 6 March 1999 (aged 89); Hanover, Lower Saxony; Germany
- Education: Technische Hochschule Hannover; Technische Hochschule Berlin-Charlottenburg
- Occupations: Architect; City planning Director
- Parents: Ernst Hillebrecht (1876–1938) (father); Bertha Arning (1875–1964) (mother)

Rudolf Hillebrecht (26 February 1910 – 6 March 1999) was a German architect and city planner. In 1948, against an impressive list of rival candidates, he succeeded in obtaining appointment as city planning officer for his home city of Hannover, with a mandate to rebuild a city that had suffered massive bomb damage between 1942 and 1945. He approached his task with evangelical zeal. His ideas for post-war Hanover aligned with the prevailing spirit of the "Wirtschaftswunder" years, and by 1959 it was possible to boast that Hannover was the only city in West Germany with its own network of city motorways, while Hillebrecht had probably become the only man alive in Hannover with an international reputation. Urban developments during the next twenty years repeatedly demonstrated the extent of Hillebrand's influence across and beyond western Europe. His redevelopment of Hannover was nevertheless not uncontroversial even at the time. A large number of historical buildings that had somehow survived Anglo-American bombing were now destroyed out of deference to a larger plan: some of the Hilebrecht plans involving wholesale destruction and replacement of entire districts of the city were indeed never implemented. Hillebrecht himself later conceded that the destruction, during the early 1960s, of Hannover's striking neo-Renaissance "Flusswasserkunst" (water treatment plant) had been a mistake.

== Life ==
=== Provenance and early years ===
Heinrich Friedrich Rudolf Hillebrecht was born in the north German village of Linden (since 1920 subsumed into Hannover and known as "Hannover-Linden") during the final decade of the Wilhelmine empire years. Ernst Hillebrecht (1876–1938), his father, was a grain trader. His paternal grandfather, Heinrich Hillebrecht, had moved to Linden with his young wife in 1871 to find work as a bricklayer. He prospered. His mother, born Bertha Arning (1875–1964), was the daughter of a Hannover Buildings Inspector, a government official of some importance at the time. Rudolf was his parents' only recorded child. He attended the nearby (and subsequently renamed) Empress Augusta Victoria secondary school, passing his Abitur (school graduation exam) in 1928, thereby opening the way to university-level education.

On leaving school Rudolf Hillebrecht enrolled at the Technische Hochschule Hannover (Technical University) in order to study Architecture. After two years he transferred to the "Technische Hochschule" (as it was known at that time) in Berlin-Charlottenburg where his teachers included Heinrich Tessenow and Hermann Jansen. Two years later, when he passed his "Dipl.- Ing." final exams and received his degree, he was back in Hannover.

He went on to work with Adolf Falke and Hans Nitzschke who ran an architectural firm in Hannover. This appears to have been part of a post-graduate traineeship. During the first part of 1934 he was seconded to Berlin where he worked for Walter Gropius, helping with an entry for the "Häuser der Arbeit" architectural competition conducted under the auspices of the government backed German Labour Front. They presented a proposal for a modern cubist development decorated with an abundance of swastika flags. (Gropius, who had made the political error ten years before the Hitler take-over of choosing a Jewish wife, emigrated a few months later.) After that Hillebrecht found a job with the "Bundesverband der Deutschen Luft- und Raumfahrtindustrie" working in Travemünde and Hamburg, exercising an oversight role as a government construction manager for a so-called anti-aircraft barracks development in Hamburg-Ohlsdorf.

=== Leadership responsibilities under Konstanty Gutschow ===
Passing the Level 2 national architecture exams in 1937 opened up new professional opportunities. Hillebrecht left government service and accepted a senior appointment as a "Chefarchitekt" with Konstanty Gutschow in Hamburg. Gutschow was in exceptionally good standing with the government, having recently submitted an entry to a government competition for the "Elbufer" ("Elbe shore") development in the context of the prestigious "Führerstädte" initiative, with a massive riverside redevelopment scheme incorporating the latest ideas from New York, including a 250m high sky-scraper for the party. The Gutschow tender so impressed the leader that in January 1939 he intervened personally to award first place to the Gutschow scheme. In 1939 Gutschow was appointed "Architekt des Elbufers" ("Architect to the Elbe Riverside") by Karl Kaufmann and given the task of drawing up a more wide-ranging redevelopment plan for a new "Führerstadt Hamburg". Hillebrecht was by now part of a small inner circle in Gutschow's architecture practice which, at the start of 1941, numbered 150 people. By the end of 1942 that had increased to 250. At least one commentator describes Hillebrecht as "Gutrschow's closest co-worker" during this time Starting in 1941, as Anglo-American bombing began to take its toll on Hamburg's civilian infrastructure, Gutschow's practice acquired a complementary role as the "Amt für kriegswichtigen Einsatz", organising operations made necessary by war damage, such as rubble clearance, air-raid protection measures and finding replacement housing for civilians whose homes had been destroyed. Running Gutschow's office, Hillebrecht displayed formidable organisational abilities. He was involved in the scheme for rebuilding Hamburg, co-ordinating the use both of prisoners of war and German detainees as forced labourers. Notably, he organised the procurement of materials for the rapid construction of air-raid shelters. That included the large-scale procurement of clinker bricks from the infamous Neuengamme concentration camp brick factory.

In December 1943 Hillebrecht and Gutschow became active members of Albert Speer's "Arbeitsstab für den Wiederaufbau bombenzerstörter Städte" (loosely, "Rebuilding staff") team. During January 1944 the two men undertook a tour which involved visiting 24 towns and cities that had suffered major destruction from aerial bombing. An early result was their report "Richtlinien zur Statistik" ("Guidelines for Statistics") and an extensive amount of damage mapping, intended to serve as the basis for post-war reconstruction plans.

The slaughter of war was by this time leaving the army desperately short of fighting men, and in September 1944 Rudolf Hillebrecht, still aged only 34, was conscripted into an artillery regiment. He experienced the end of the war as an American prisoner of war, but was released just six months later, in November 1945. He made his way back to Hamburg.

=== City planning Director for Hannover ===
At the start of 1946 Hillebrecht found a job which involved responsibility for reconstruction with Viktor Agartz, a socialist politician and academic who had recently been given charge of the "Main Regional Office for Economic Matters" by the British military administrators. The British army had taken control of north-west Germany in May 1945 under terms provisionally agreed with Soviet and American leaders. Responsibilities were poorly defined and the arrangement proved short-lived.

In 1947 Hillebrecht accepted a new appointment, back in Hamburg, as "Sekretär für Bau- und Wohnungswesen im Zonenbeirat" (loosely, "Secretary for Building and Housing in the Hamburg Zone Advisory Council").

After successfully applying for a post as city buildings officer in Hannover, in 1948 continued to implement the concepts he had developed in the context of Speer's "Arbeitsstab für den Wiederaufbau" plans with Gutschow, during their time together in Hamburg. He remained in close contact with Gutschow who now provided support in an advisory capacity. Under their oft-repeated slogan "Deutschland will leben – Deutschland muß bauen" (Note: "Germany wants to live on - Germany must build") Hillebrecht and Gutschow teamed up together to instigate the "Constructa" construction businesses trade fair, held in 1951. The exhibition consciously emphasised the role of Hannover in pointing the way ahead for other cities looking to rebuild and redevelop in anticipation of a new age of mass mobility. Hillebrecht and, after 1948, his newly recruited planning office manager Hans Stosberg (Note: Hans Stosberg (1903-1989) was a former NSDAP member who won plaudits during the Hitler years and condemnation after 1945 for his role as the "Auschwitz architect".) formed an exceptionally "well-trained team", backed up by an unusual degree of professional mutual trust, in the judgment of the architecture historian Werner Durth. Another senior member of Hillebrecht's team at Hannover was Wilhelm Wortmann, an architect from Bremen who joined in 1949 and was another former member of Speer's "Arbeitsstab für den Wiederaufbau" team. It was Wortmann who worked up and in 1951 delivered a pioneering zoning plan ("Flächennutzungsplan") for Hannover.

Despite very considerable – and understandable – resistance, Hillebrecht managed to persuade land owners not to insist on preserving plot shapes and sizes corresponding precisely to those on place before the British and American bombers destroyed so much of the city. That was crucial if the city centre layout was to function properly for a population of citizen-car drivers, such as already existed in the USA. Of the 61-hectare (150-acre) area in the heart of the city which had been completely destroyed, now defined for the purpose of the exercise, as the city-centre, slightly under 15% was transferred to city ownership at nil cost. An early and widely publicised example was the Kreuzkirchen quarter, in the "old town" of Hannover. The baroque street contours that had characterised this residential district of central Hannover before the Anglo-American bombing were abandoned in favour of gently curved streets. The objective was to keep the motor traffic on broad streets on the edge, while the inner city should be largely traffic-free. At the same time easy access to all central areas should be made easier through the construction of a broad inner-city ring road. With memories still fresh of city centres replaced by piles of rubble reaching as far as the horizon, initial reactions were overwhelmingly positive. Der Spiegel dedicated a lengthy cover-feature to the development under the headline title "Das Wunder von Hannover" ("The Hannover Miracle"), incorporating a photo-portrait of Hillebrecht. Today Hillebrecht continues to be seen as the harbinger of a generation of city planners who re-defined urban living space for the second half of the twentieth century, realising in concrete the post-war dream of a car-friendly metropolis.

Building large urban motorways (Hamburger Allee, Berliner Allee, Leibnizufer) through the central parts of the city led to further destruction of the relatively dense prewar city quarters. The broad motor roads separated and in places still divide entire city districts, sometimes replaced with large structures designed without thought for their surroundings and standing out as the architectural equivalent of "foreign bodies", uncompromisingly contrasting with the surrounding streetscapes. Traditional city squares became more traffic nodes while street corners simply disappeared. The seventeenth century "Calenberger Neustadt" is separated from the rest of the old city by the six lane "Leibnizufer" highway. The old Leine Island became less of an island through the filling in of a channel. Priorities and fashions have changed, however, and Hillebrecht's approach to city planning has fallen grace with a succession of bumps.

It was not just the old residential quarters of Hannover that suffered major post-war further demolition in support of the planners' vision. Despite popular protest, a number of old buildings of significant historical and architectural interest and merit, having survived the war, were torn down rather than being repaired or restored. A particularly notorious victim was the neo-Renaissance Flusswasserkunst building over a main arm of the Leine river, beside the Leineschloss. Another was the Friederikenschlösschen (palace) constructed one and a half centuries earlier by Georg Ludwig Friedrich Laves alongside the brutally repurposed Friederikenplatz. Many of the buildings demolished were products of the Gründerzeit and were so-called "backyard developments" filling in the formerly large unbuilt plots surrounding main buildings. The removal of Gründerzeit developments continued till the 1970s. Hillebrecht's approach to redevelopment was on display in many German cities through this period. In Hannover, however, plans to tear down the entire "List" quarter were never implemented.

In 1975 Rudolf Hillebrecht was succeeded at the Hannover planning department by Hanns Adrian, heralding a slightly less bombastic approach to city redevelopment.

== Evaluation ==
Unlike his direct contemporaries, Hillebrecht tailored his planning approach to an age of individualised motorised transport very early on. As an architect, meanwhile, he was a "Bauhaus man", revering classicist structures and rejecting historicism. He shunned sky-scrapers and preferred to talk in terms of "new construction" rather than of mere "reconstruction". During his time in charge of the city planning office most of the central heart of Hannover, including the Kröpcke square, the Georgstraße and the Bahnhofstraße ("Station Street") were transformed into what was, at the time, the largest contiguous pedestrian zone in Germany. Fifty years on, there are still very few larger. In this way Hillebrecht's vision continues to underpin Hannover's reputation as a principal shopping city for a large part of north Germany. But there were, from the outset, those who viewed Rudolf Hillebrecht's work in Hannover critically. At times that included Hillebrecht himself. As early as 1957 he was talking of his own "missed opportunities". Even though Hillebrecht was not the kind of architect who wanted personally to specify every last detail ("I don't think it's part of my job to specify the glazing bars for the windows". (Note: "Ich denke nicht daran, Fenstersprossen zu reglementieren")), when it came to urban planning he was unusual among his peers in attending to so-called "street furniture", in terms of the public art to be selected for public spaces. and details of their positioning. He became known for his habit of soliciting potential sponsors to commission works of public art from young artists, starting out on their careers.

== Recognition and celebration ==
- 1934 He worked with Gropius
- 1951 Honorarprofessor of the Technische Hochschule, Hannover
- 1953 Laves-Plakette of the "Laves Gesellschaft für moderne Baukunst"
- 1957 Praesidium member at the Deutsche Akademie für Städtebau und Landesplanung ("... urban and rural planning academy")
- 1957–1979 Chairman of the Planning Council for West Berlin
- 1958 Doctorate honoris causa of the RWTH Aachen
- 1960 Golden Dieselring
- 1962 Grand Cross of the Lower Saxony Order of Merit
- 1964 Pour le Mérite für Wissenschaft und Künste
- 1965 Grand Cross of Merit with star
- 1966 President of the Leibniz Society Hannover
- 1972 Camillo Sitte Prize for urban planning
- 1973 Chairman of the Buildings Committee of the Deutscher Städtetag
- 1973 Chairman of the Kuratorium for Urbanistics
- 1974 Member of Academy of Arts, Berlin
- 1975 Grand Cross of Merit with Star and Sash
- 1980 Honorary citizen of Hannover
- 1989 Honorary senator of the Medizinische Hochschule Hannover (MHH)

Rudolf Hillebrecht died on 6 March 1999. His body is buried at the Engesohde City Cemetery in Hannover.

The "grassy square" in front of the 1970s-style offices of the City Buildings Administration department at "Rudolf-Hillebrecht-Platz 1", beside Hannover's New City Hall, set in the grounds directly to the west of the City Hall, was renamed in Hillebrecht's honour. (Note: The New City Hall was opened in 1913. The neo-Renaissance design of it has been described as "eclectic". Accordingly, the adjective "new" in its title is (slightly) less inappropriate than it may at first flance, appear.) Fittingly, much of the "Rudolf-Hillebrecht-Platz" has been re-developed for use as a car park.
