= Theater am Aegi =

German theatre

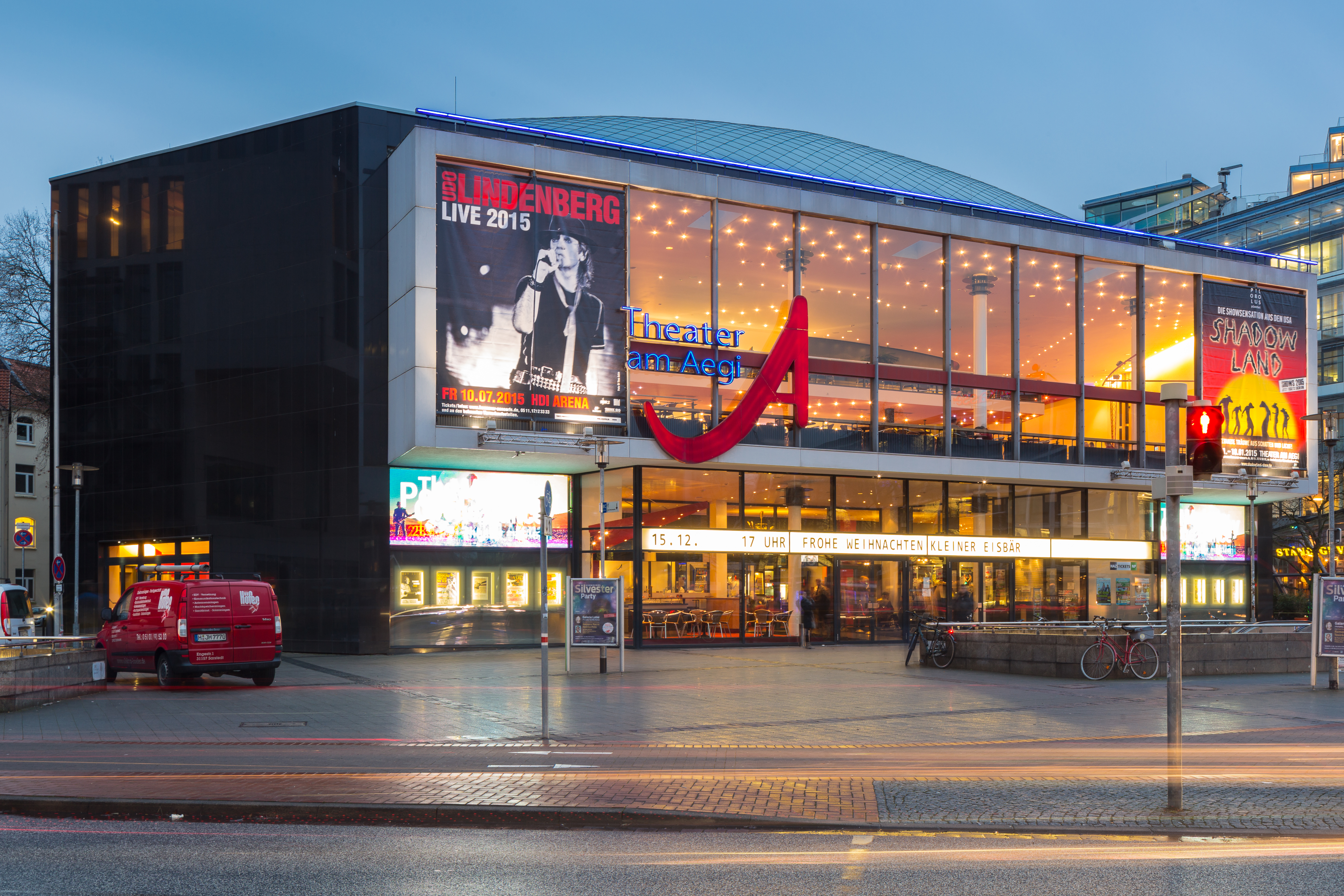
- Interactive map of Theater am Aegi

General information
- Status: Theatre
- Location: Hanover, Lower Saxony, Germany, 2 Aegidientorplatz
- Coordinates: 52°22′03.7″N 9°44′35.5″E
- Opened: 1953
- Renovated: 1967

Design and construction
- Architects: Gerd Lichtenhahn; Hans Klüppelberg

Website
- www.theater-am-aegi.de

The Theater am Aegi is an event venue on Aegidientorplatz square in Hannover, the capital of Lower Saxony, Germany. Like the square, it is often referred to as Aegi. The building was opened in 1953 mainly as a cinema, with a versatile stage also for other performances. It has been a Gastspieltheater for local and touring companies, without its own personnel. After a fire, it was rebuilt as a theatre only, opened in 1967, and then mainly as a venue for drama performances of the state-run Staatstheater Hannover. After a new theatre was built for that company in 1992, Theater am Aegi returned to its traditional role of a venue for various events, including congress, private functions and representation of the city.

== History ==
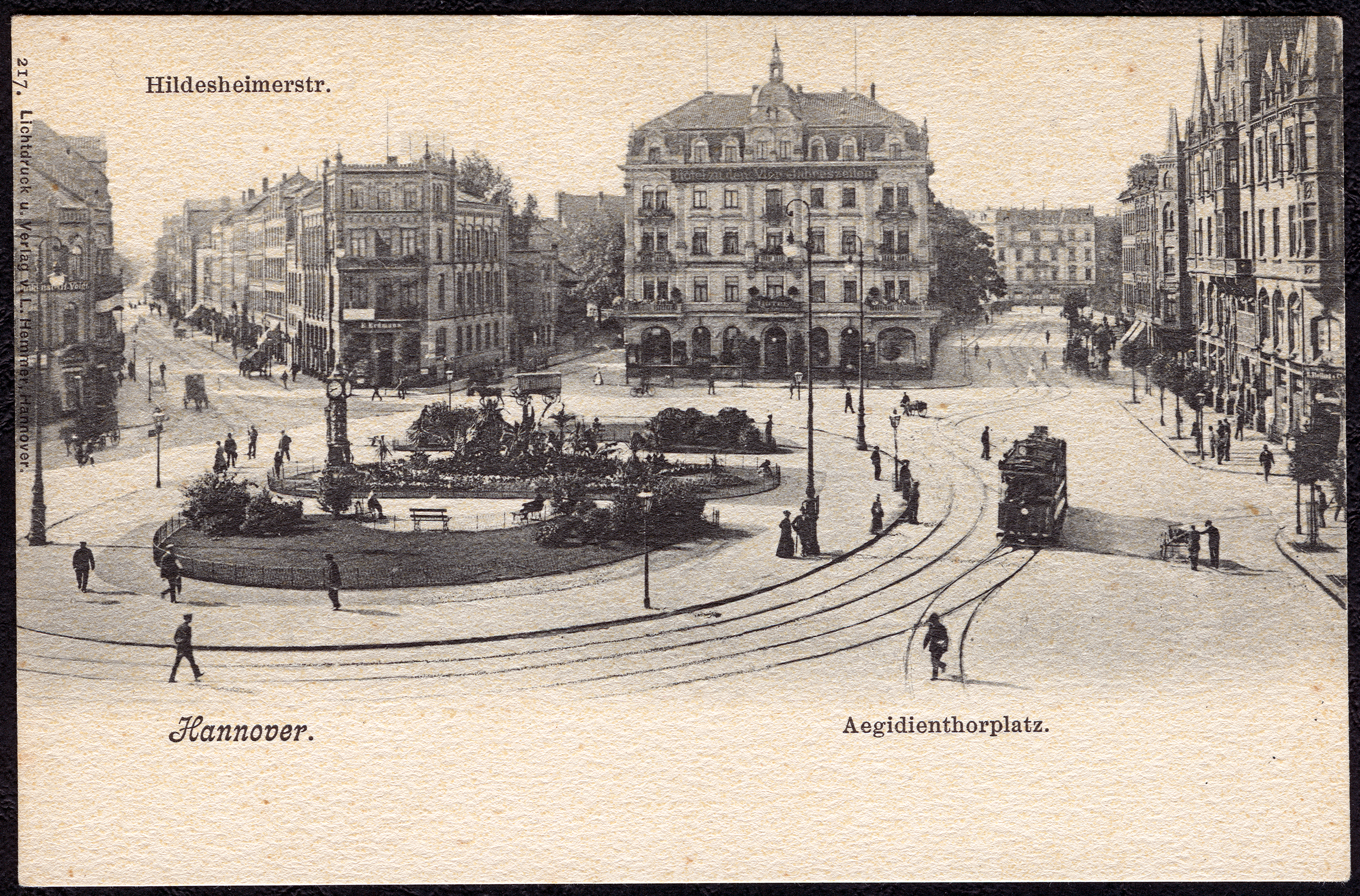
Hotel Vier Jahreszeiten on the Aegidientorplatz, postcard, c. 1900

The site of today's theatre at the Aegidientorplatz (Aegidien gate square) was used as a cinema venue from 1920 in the hall of the hotel Vier Jahreszeiten seating 1,400 spectators. It was converted into the Ufa-Palast in 1924. This building was destroyed by bombing during the Second World War. In 1953, a theatre was built almost at the same location. It was designed in post-war modernist style by architects Gerd Lichtenhahn and Hans Klüppelberg. It housed a cinema where films were premiered, with a stage suitable for artistic and musical performances. When it opened it was named "das modernste Theater Deutschlands" (Germany's most modern theatre). It was the largest cinema in northern Germany. The stage was used regularly by the Landesbühne Hannover, a regional company, and by the Thalia-Theater company. The building was largely destroyed by a fire in 1964. It was restored with refurbished features and a larger hall, opened in 1967. It was then also used as a venue of the municipal Schauspiel Hannover.

The theatre's appearance was changed by a new facade in 1978. In 1981, the house was connected by an entrance to the new subway station U-Bahn-Station Aegidientorplatz. When the Schauspiel Hannover moved to a new building in 1992, the Theater am Aegi was threatened with closure, but committed citizens developed a new concept for usage as a multifunctional stage. Following the tradition from the 1950s, it hosts performances of musical, cabaret, comedies and drama, opera, dance and concerts. In addition, it is available for gala events, congresses, trade fairs and private events. The theatre was again renovated from 2009 to 2016. The restoration of the roof received a Sanierungspreis award in the category metal in 2018. Beginning with the 2010/11 season, the theatre served also as a venue of the Theater für Niedersachsen, a fusion of the Landesbühne Hannover and the Stadttheater Hildesheim.

Beginning in 1994, the house is operated by a private operator based in Hanover. Its managing directors are Michael Lohmann, at the same time managing director of the Hannover Concerts, and Jürgen Hoffmann. According to the theatre, the annual average attendance is 200,000 people.
