= Breidenbacher Hof =

Coordinates: 51°13′31″N 6°46′40″E

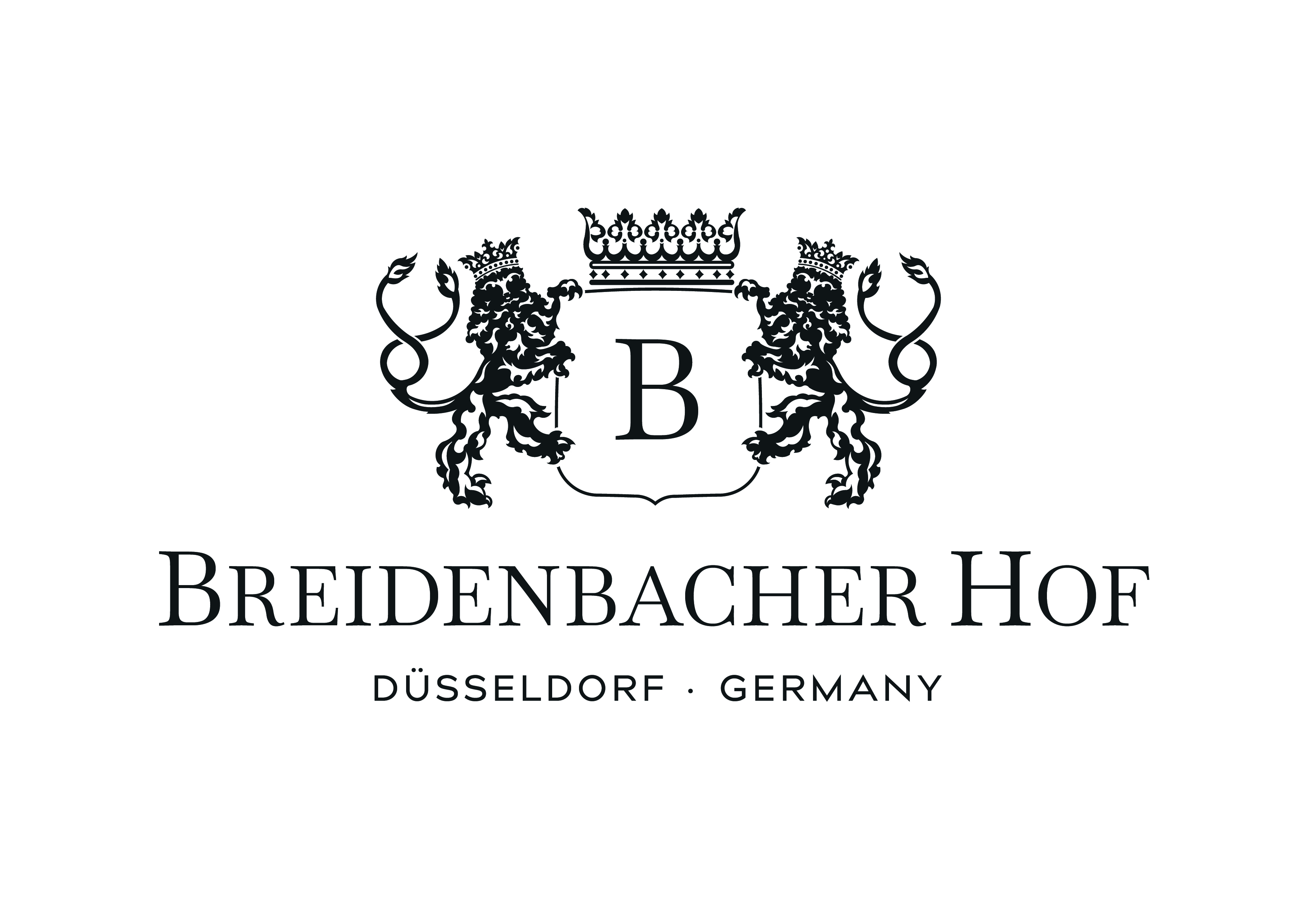
- Interactive map of the Breidenbacher Hof area

General information
- Location: Düsseldorf, Germany, Königsallee 11
- Opening: 1806

Other information
- Number of rooms: 79
- Number of suites: 16
- Number of restaurants: 3

Website
- www.breidenbacherhof.com

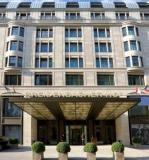
Main entrance

Breidenbacher Hof is a five-star hotel in Düsseldorf, Germany, located on the Königsallee in the Carlstadt.

== History ==
The history of the Breidenbacher Hof begins in 1806, when restaurateur, Wilhelm Breidenbach, won a bid for a plot of land in Düsseldorf. Collaborating with architect Adolph von Vagedes, Breidenbach's vision to erect a hotel for the rich and powerful was realized. After its opening in 1812, the Breidenbacher Hof flourished, with guests including kings and queens, nobles, politicians and artists, until a major bombing in 1943 destroyed the hotel. After its demolition during World War II, the hotel was re-built under the direction of Georg Linsenmeyer and re-opened in 1950. In the mid-1980s, the hotel was bought by Georg Rafael, co-founder of the Regent hotel chain.

The property was closed in 1999. In 2005, it was torn down to be rebuilt by its new owner, the Pearl of Kuwait Real Estate Company. The rebuilding of the hotel began in 2006.

During the excavation process for the hotel's new foundation and sub-street levels, a section of sandstone was found from the historic city wall of Düsseldorf, below street level. Construction plans were modified to allow a reconstructed portion of the original wall to be on view from a retail level of the project below. The hotel re-opened on May 19, 2008, under the management of Capella Hotels and Resorts.
