= Bennet Eickhoff =

German footballer

Personal information
- Date of birth: 15 July 1995 (age 31)
- Place of birth: Germany
- Height: 1.89 m (6 ft 2 in)
- Position: Right back

Team information
- Current team: Rot Weiss Ahlen
- Number: 7

Youth career
- –2014: Preußen Münster

Senior career*
Years	Team	Apps	(Gls)
2014–2017	Preußen Münster II	40	(1)
2016–2017	Preußen Münster	1	(0)
2017–2018	Hammer SpVg	27	(0)
2018–2019	TuS Haltern	18	(3)
2019–2022	Rot Weiss Ahlen	81	(4)
2022–2024	SV Westfalia Soest	27	(2)
2024–	Preußen Münster II	0	(0)
- * Club domestic league appearances and goals as of 26 May 2024

Bennet Eickhoff (born 15 July 1995) is a German footballer who plays as a right back for Preußen Münster II in Oberliga Westfalen.
