= Hildesheimer Straße =

Street in Hanover, Germany

Hildesheimer Straße is a main road in Hanover and the neighbouring town of Laatzen, Germany. It is about 14 kilometers (9 miles) long and used by B Line of Hanover Stadtbahn. Connecting central Hanover to the districts in the south, it is one of Hanover's most important and most-used roads. The headquarters of some institutions and organisations line the northern end of Hildesheimer Straße, for example the Hanover regional administration.
