= Alte Tonhalle =

Concert hall in Dusseldorf

Coordinates: 51.227232°N 6.787083°E

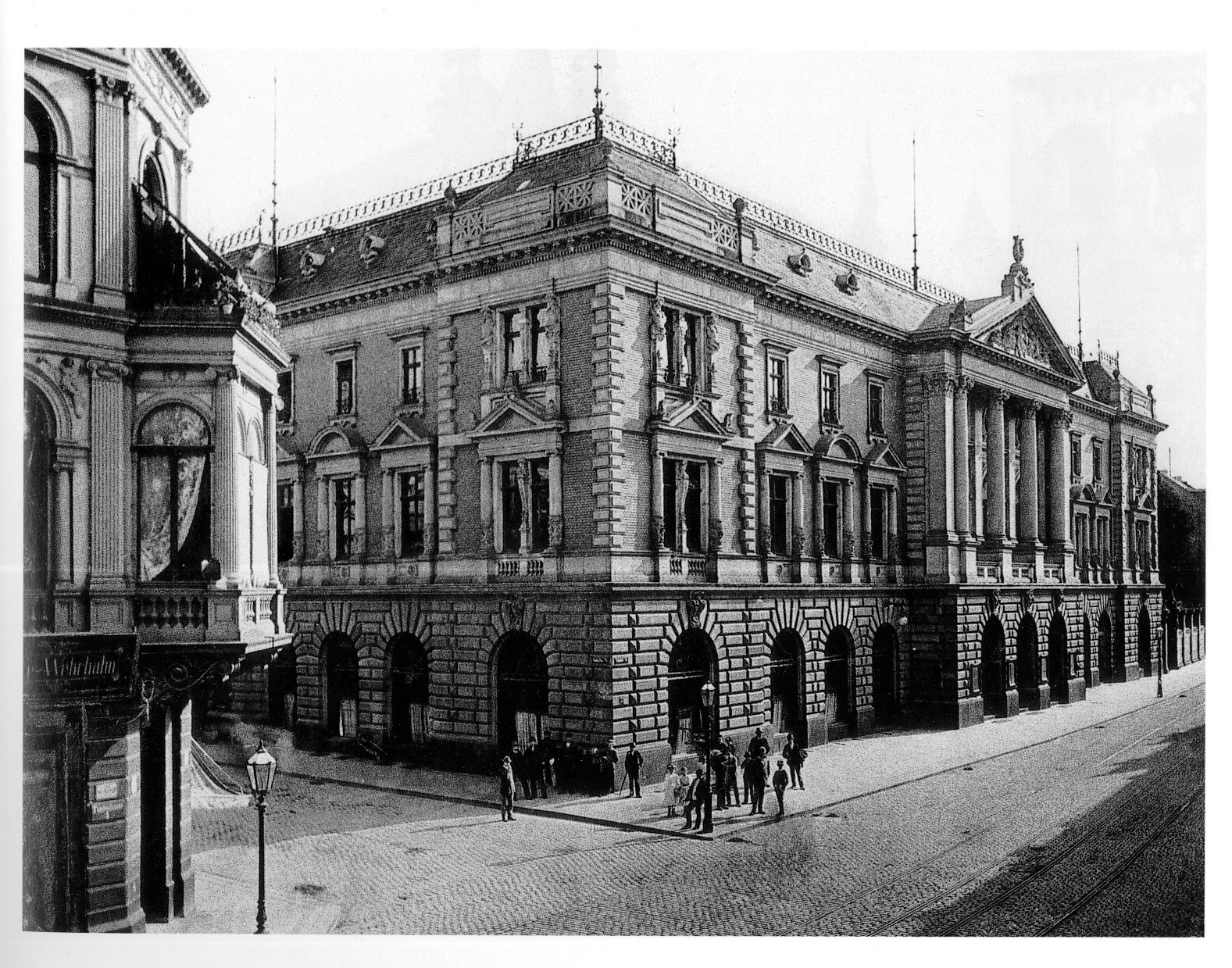
Old Tonhalle Building Schadowstraße 89-93

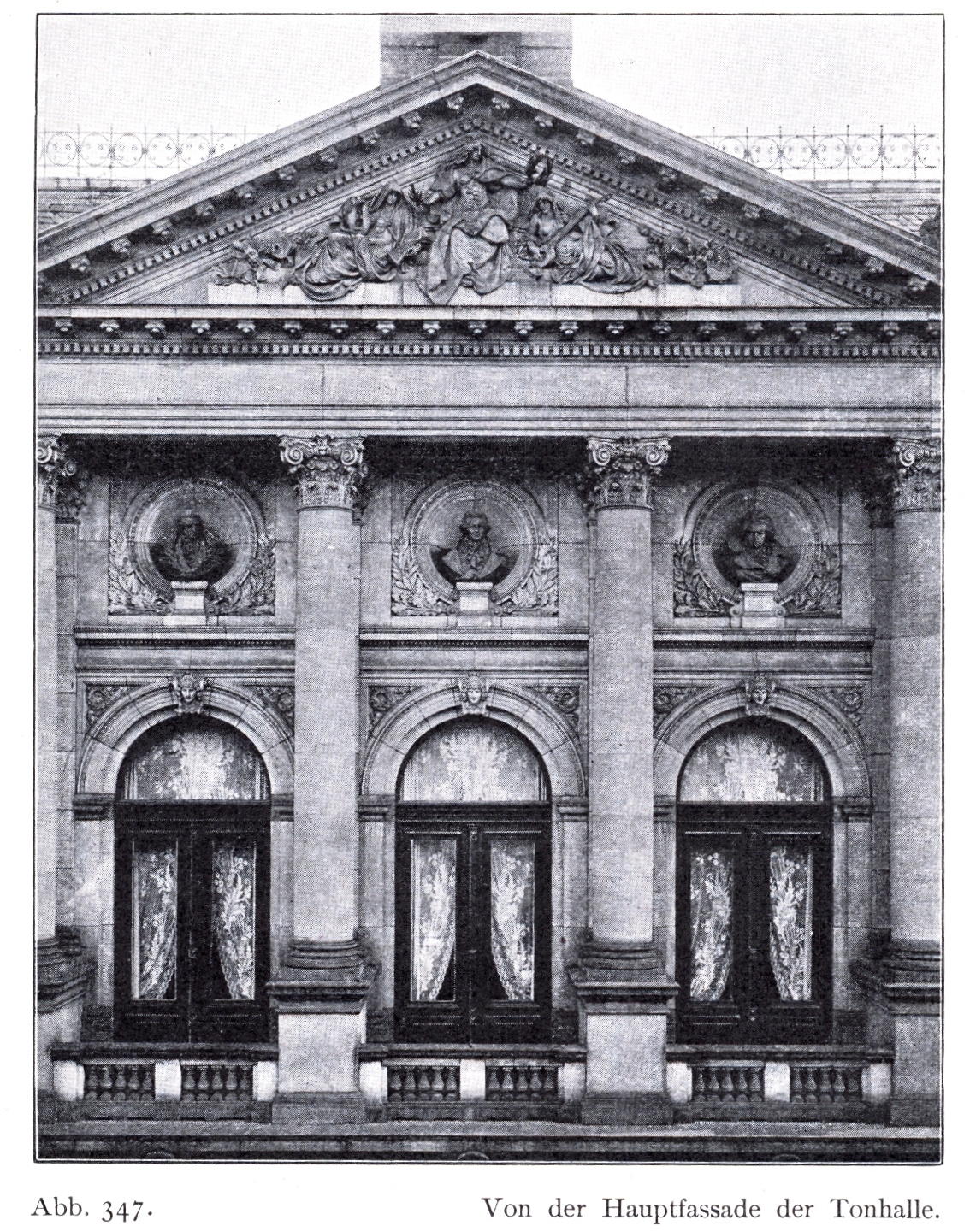
Façade of the Alte Tonhalle

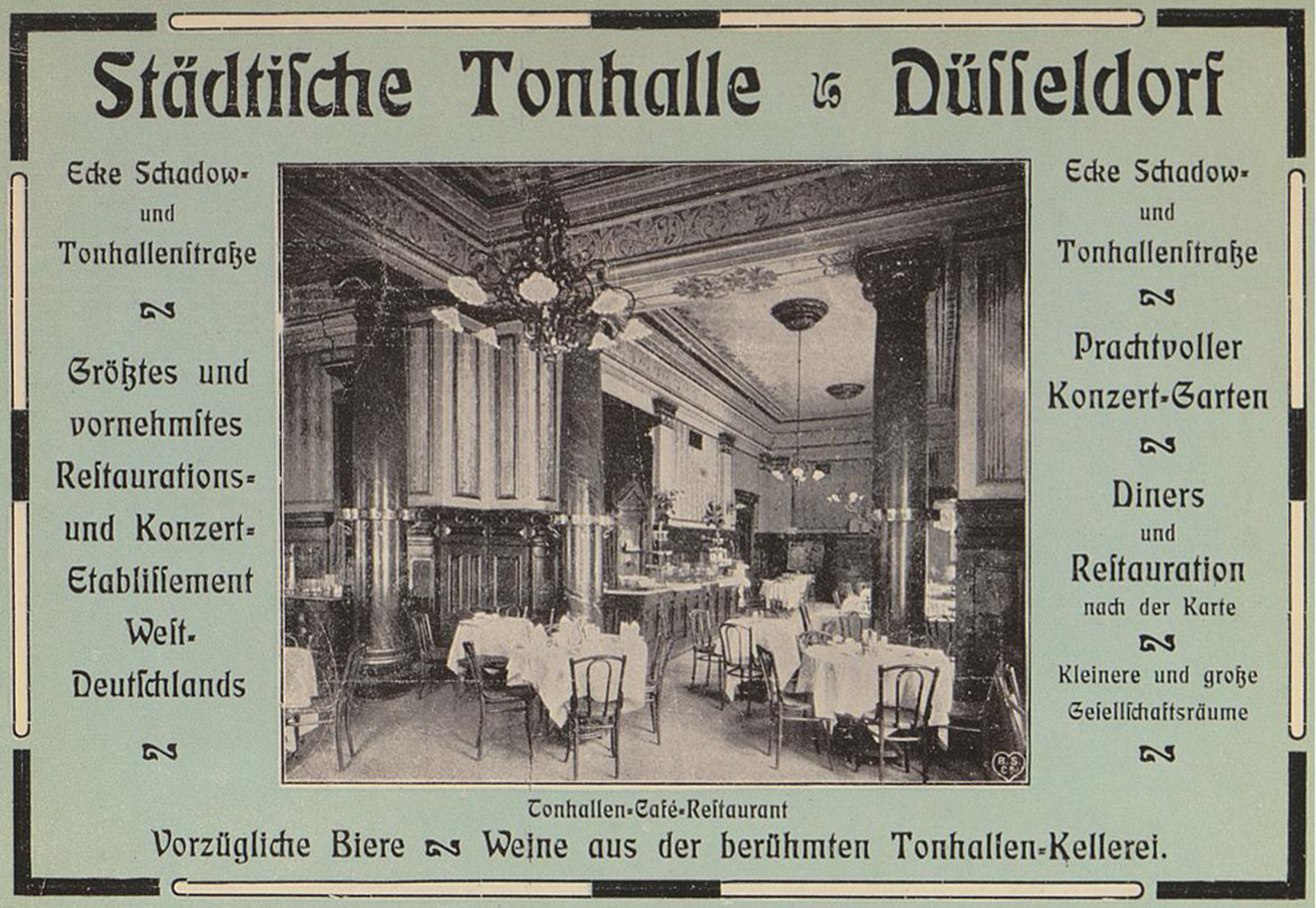
Tonhallen-Café-Restaurant, 1905

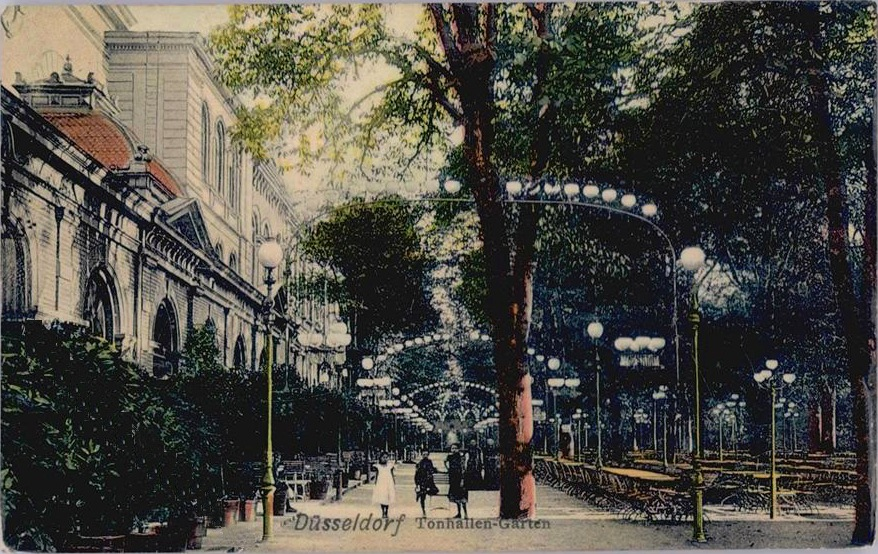
Tonhallen-Garten (Postcard), before 1906

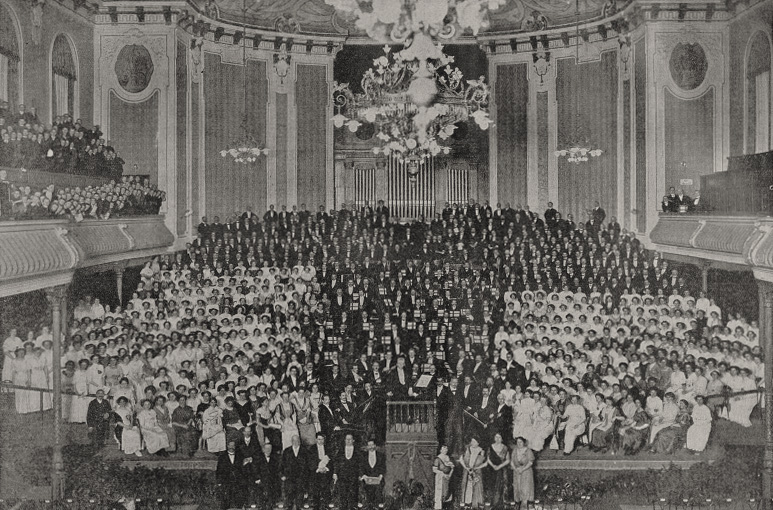
Performance of Mahler's VIII Symphony in the Kaisersaal of the Städtische Tonhalle Düsseldorf on 11 and 12 December 1912. Photo Josef Henne

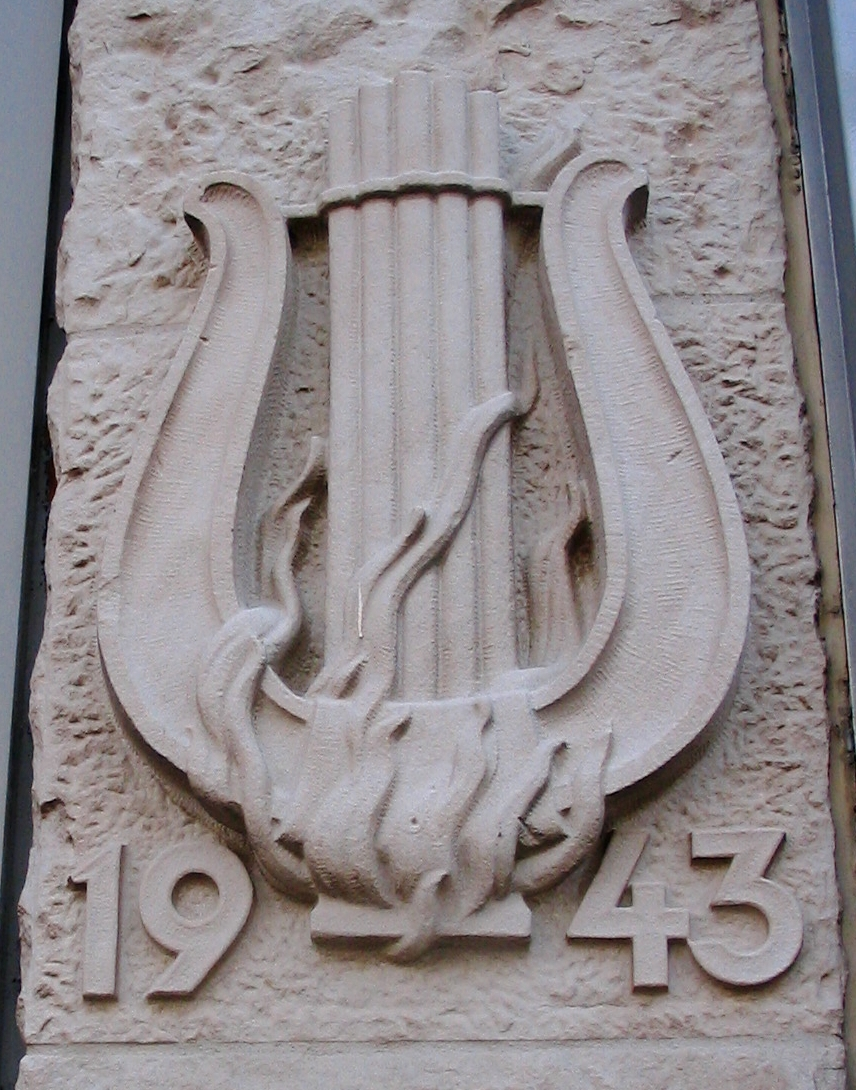
Memorial relief of a lyre with flames by Willi Hoselmann at the Karstadt building (ca. 1952)

The Alte Tonhalle was a municipal social and concert hall in Düsseldorf.

== Description ==
In 1818, the first Lower Rhenish Music Festival, constituted by the Städtischer Musikverein zu Düsseldorf, took place in the Geisler'schen Lokal, which became the centre of music lovers from 1830. It was a restaurant with a large wooden hall, which had already been known as Becker's Gartenlokal. In the Geisler's Hall, the audience in 1850 was close to 1000 visitors. In 1863, the city acquired the pub, which was already called Tonhalle at that time.

Famous composers such as Felix Mendelssohn Bartholdy, Norbert Burgmüller, Ferdinand Hiller, Julius Rietz, Ferdinand Ries and Robert Schumann made music there. Joseph Joachim and Jenny Lind participated in concerts here. Franz Liszt, Johannes Brahms and many great artists of the 19th century celebrated great successes here. Mendelssohn's Paulus in 1836 and Schumann's Der Rose Pilgerfahrt and Requiem für Mignon from 1849 were among others premieres performed here. In December 1912, the second performance of Mahler's Symphony No. 8, after the Munich premiere in September 1910, took place with 1000 participants.

The first municipal Tonhalle was built in two years and opened in 1865. It was located on Flinger Steinweg, today's Schadowstraße. The building had a large concert hall, the Kaisersaal, which was 42.48 m long and 24.20 m wide. With two galleries, this room held 2820 people. The hall, which was distinguished by good acoustics, was named after Kaiser Wilhelm I, in whose honour the Rhenish Provincial Estates was given a banquet in the Tonhalle on the occasion of his visit on 18 September 1884.

In 1886, a competition was held for a new building, in which the designs of the architects Hermann vom Endt and Bruno Schmitz in the neo-Renaissance style were awarded. The city architects Eberhard Westhofen and Peiffhoven later planned an extension based on these new building plans, which was implemented from 1889 to 1892. The central entrance area of the building was accentuated by a classicist portico. From this building segment comes a column that Helmut Hentrich had erected in the Malkastenpark as a reminder of the traditional place of Düsseldorf music and festival culture. The Kaisersaal, the Rittersaal, the Verbindungssaal and a large number of representative side rooms were preserved. In 1901, the Kaisersaal was given a new stucco finish by the city architect Peiffhoven and the alderman Johannes Radke. The Knights' Hall was furnished with ceiling paintings by the firm Hemming & Witte. The central part of the main façade showed four columns, crowned by a triangular gable.

The building complex had been brought forward to Schadowstraße 91 during the expansion. The building now included new social rooms, shops and restaurants in addition to the concert halls that had been taken over. The Düsseldorf carnival clubs held their meetings in the building, and the Malkasten celebrated its Malkasten-Redoute here. In addition to the weekly symphony concerts, meetings of business associations, lectures, charity bazaars and carnival balls also took place there. At a "coal day" held by the coal and steel industry in the Tonhalle in 1871, William Thomas Mulvany founded the Verein zur Wahrung der gemeinsamen wirtschaftlichen Interessen in Rheinland und Westfalen, thus laying a foundation stone for the development of economic interest representation in West Germany and for the development of Düsseldorf into the Schreibtisch des Ruhrgebiets.

The building was damaged by bombs in 1943 and later demolished. The city sold the Tonhallen site in the early 1950s to Karstadt AG which had a new department store built on the same site according to plans by the architect Philipp Schaefer.

== See also ==
- Tonhalle des Südens
- Tonhalle Düsseldorf
