= Martha Hackett =

American actress

- Education: Harvard University (AB)
- Occupation: Actress
- Years active: 1986–present
- Spouse(s): Tim Disney (m. ?; div. 2004)
- Children: 2
- Website: marthahackettofficial.com

Martha Hackett is an American actress. She is known for her portrayal of Seska in thirteen episodes of the television series Star Trek: Voyager. Hackett is an alumna of Harvard University/Radcliffe College, and was married to independent filmmaker Tim Disney.

== Career ==
Hackett's first experience of Star Trek was when she auditioned for the role of Jadzia Dax in Star Trek: Deep Space Nine, but lost out to Terry Farrell. She subsequently was cast as a member of the Terellian alien species in the finale of Star Trek: The Next Generation, "All Good Things...". She appeared on Deep Space Nine as the Romulan Sub Commander T'Rul in the two-part episode "The Search" in season three.

She was cast in Star Trek: Voyager in the recurring role of Seska, a Bajoran member of the Maquis crew who joined Voyager after it was stranded in the Delta Quadrant. She first appeared in the episode "Parallax" where she wore the blue uniform of a Starfleet science officer; this was later revealed to be a costuming error and she was subsequently seen in the uniform of the operations department. The original uniform sold for $1,276 ($1,910 today) in the "It's a Wrap!" auction on eBay in 2008.

When she was first cast in the role of Seska, she was not informed that she was a Cardassian spy. She later explained that "when I first started I was Seska the Bajoran Maquis member and they sort of worked everything else up in soap opera fashion." Hackett became pregnant, which was written into Seska's character. Hackett described Seska as being a character with several layers, saying that "Seska’s darker sides came from a certain emotional instability, at least that’s how I played her." Seska was killed off in the second part of "Basics", which came as a surprise to Hackett as she was previously sent a version of the script where Seska survived, but her baby died. She was only told that Seska was to die less than a day before filming. Following her character's death, Hackett as Seska returned to Voyager twice more in the episodes "Worst Case Scenario" and "Shattered". She appeared in a total of thirteen episodes of Voyager.

In 2001, she appeared in the independent film Question of Faith, where she played the monk Anselm. Her character underwent a sex change from male to female as part of a divine miracle. The film was directed by her husband.

In 2018, she appeared on the game show To Tell the Truth.

== Personal life ==
Hackett was married to Tim Disney, and they have two sons together. Hackett has an A.B. cum laude from Harvard University/Radcliffe College.

== Filmography ==
=== Film ===
Year	Title	Role	Notes
1989	Mind Trap	Shana Beddow	
1991	Flight of Black Angel	Nurse	
1993	Carnosaur	Miss Kroghe	
1994	Leprechaun 2	Detective	
1994	In the Heat of Passion II: Unfaithful	Muriel Walters	
1995	One Night Stand	Nora Walsh	
1998	Music from Another Room	Paula	
1998	Inconceivable	Jill, WOMB member	Credited as Martha Hacket
1999	The Last Man on Planet Earth	Mother May the Madame	
1999	Never Been Kissed	Mrs. Knox	
1999	Let the Devil Wear Black	Cop #2	
2000	A Question of Faith	Anselm	Credited as M.E. Hackett
2003	The Lone Ranger	Margaret	
2005	Kiss Kiss Bang Bang	Pistol Woman	
2014	Alexander and the Terrible, Horrible, No Good, Very Bad Day	Mrs. Gibson	

=== Television ===
Year	Title	Role	Notes
1986	Hill Street Blues	Carole Green	2 episodes
1989	Hard Time on Planet Earth	—N/a	Episode: "Jesse's Fifteen Minutes"
1990	The Marshall Chronicles	—N/a	Episode: "Friday Night Fever"
1992	Civil Wars	Helen Cashman	Episode: "A Bus Named Desire"
1993	Sirens	Camilla	Episode: "Guy Perfect"
1994	Star Trek: Deep Space Nine	T'Rul	2 episodes
1995–2001	Star Trek: Voyager	Seska	13 episodes
2002	The Guardian	Cynthia Popper	Episode: "Mothers of the Disappeared"
2009–2010	I Heart Vampires	Siona McCabre	6 episodes
2009	NCIS	Celia Roberts	Episode: "Caged"
2012	Last Resort	Forest	Episode: "Nuke It Out"
2013	Perception	Leah Sullivan	Episode: "Toxic"
2014	Masters of Sex	Shirley	Episode: "Thank You for Coming"
2016–2018	Days of Our Lives	Pamela Van Damme	4 episodes

=== Video games ===
Year	Title	Role
1996	Star Trek: Klingon	Pok's Mother
2001	Star Trek: Armada II	Additional Voices
2002	Star Trek: Bridge Commander	Cmdr. Saffi Larsen
2003	Star Trek: Elite Force II	Dr. Stevenson
