= Lisa Giobbi =

American choreographer and aerial artist

Lisa Giobbi is an American choreographer and aerial artist. She is the artistic director of the Lisa Giobbi Movement Theatre which she founded in 1991. She has performed with and choreographed for the MOMIX and Pilobolus dance companies.

== Career ==
A graduate of Juilliard, she joined MOMIX in 1983 where she collaborated and performed with Moses Pendleton for eight years. She choreographed and performed with Pilobolus, creating a number of pieces including Television, Return to Maria La Baja and Lands Edge which remain in the repertoire. She worked with Marta Clarke, including the Garden of Earthly Delights, Vienna: Lusthaus, Vienna: Lusthaus Revisited, Endangered Species and A Midsummer Night’s Dream.

Giobbi founded the Lisa Giobbi Movement Theatre while working on circus arts and dance with Circus Flora and working as staff choreographer for the Big Apple Circus. Giobbi performed aerial work most notably at the Joyce Theater in New York, La Scala in Milan and La Fenice in Venice, as well as the Boston Dance Umbrella Aerial festivals, the Frequent Flyers Festival and the Santa Rosalia Festival in Palermo. She was a three-time guest artist of the Deutsche Opera in Berlin.

Giobbi has created choreography for films including What Dreams May Come and Temptesta and for independent films, music videos, commercials, fashion shows (Victoria's Secret 2000, 2001 and 2003 runway shoes), benefits, television specials, cabaret theatre, gala presentations and rock concerts (2005 Amsterjam). Her Off-Broadway theatrical productions include David Rabe’s Those the River Keep and David Lynch’s Industrial Symphony #1.

Giobbi has been nominated for MTV choreographer awards for videos such as Gloria Estefan and Tommy Lee’s "Hold Me Down", among others. Her work has been presented in Variety Teatre at the Wintergarten Variety in Berlin, the Apollo-Theater Düsseldorf, and the Friedrichbau in Stuttgart. She has toured excerpts from the Falling Angels show throughout Europe in collaboration with the British band The Tiger Lillies in The Tiger Lilies Circus.

== Personal life ==
Giobbi is married to actor Paul Guilfoyle; they have a daughter called Snowden and live in New York City.
