= Stahlhof (Düsseldorf) =

Seat of the Düsseldorf Administrative Court

Coordinates: 51.2213°N 6.7763°E

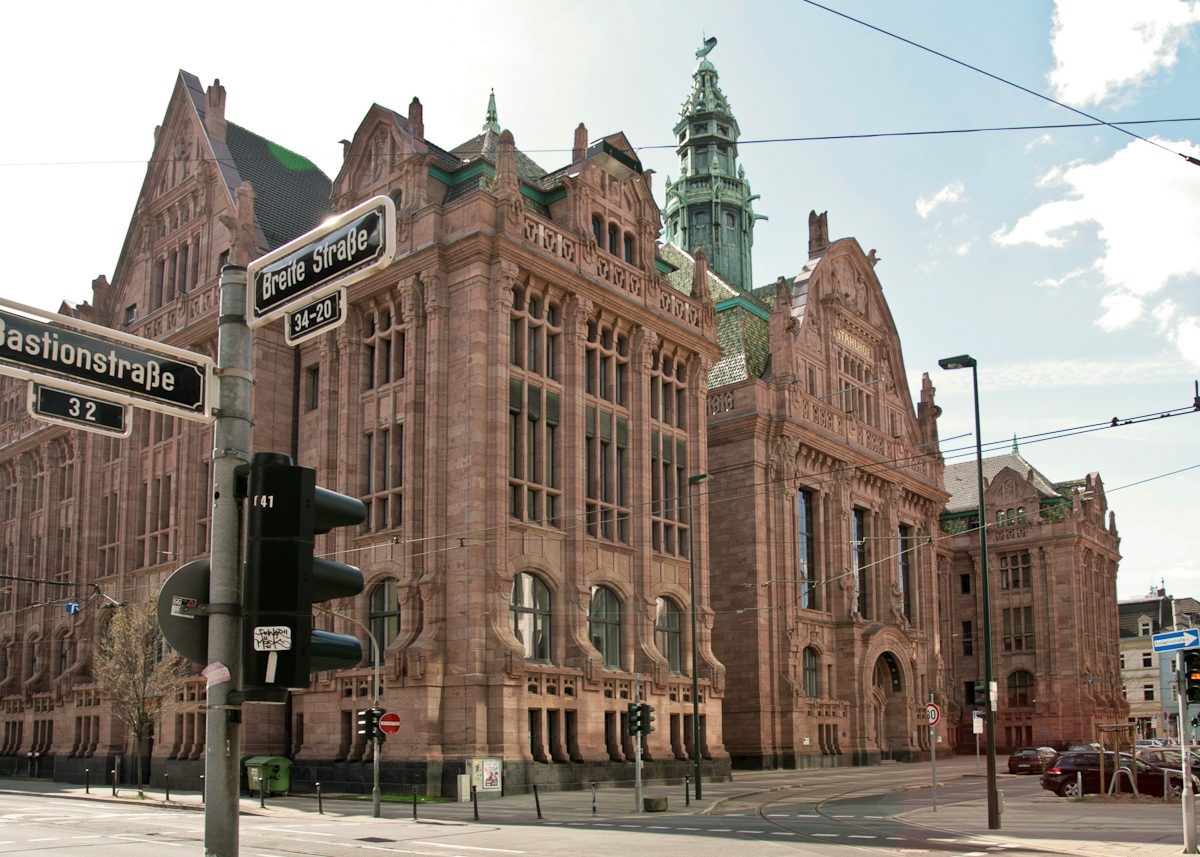
The Stahlhof, perspective view.

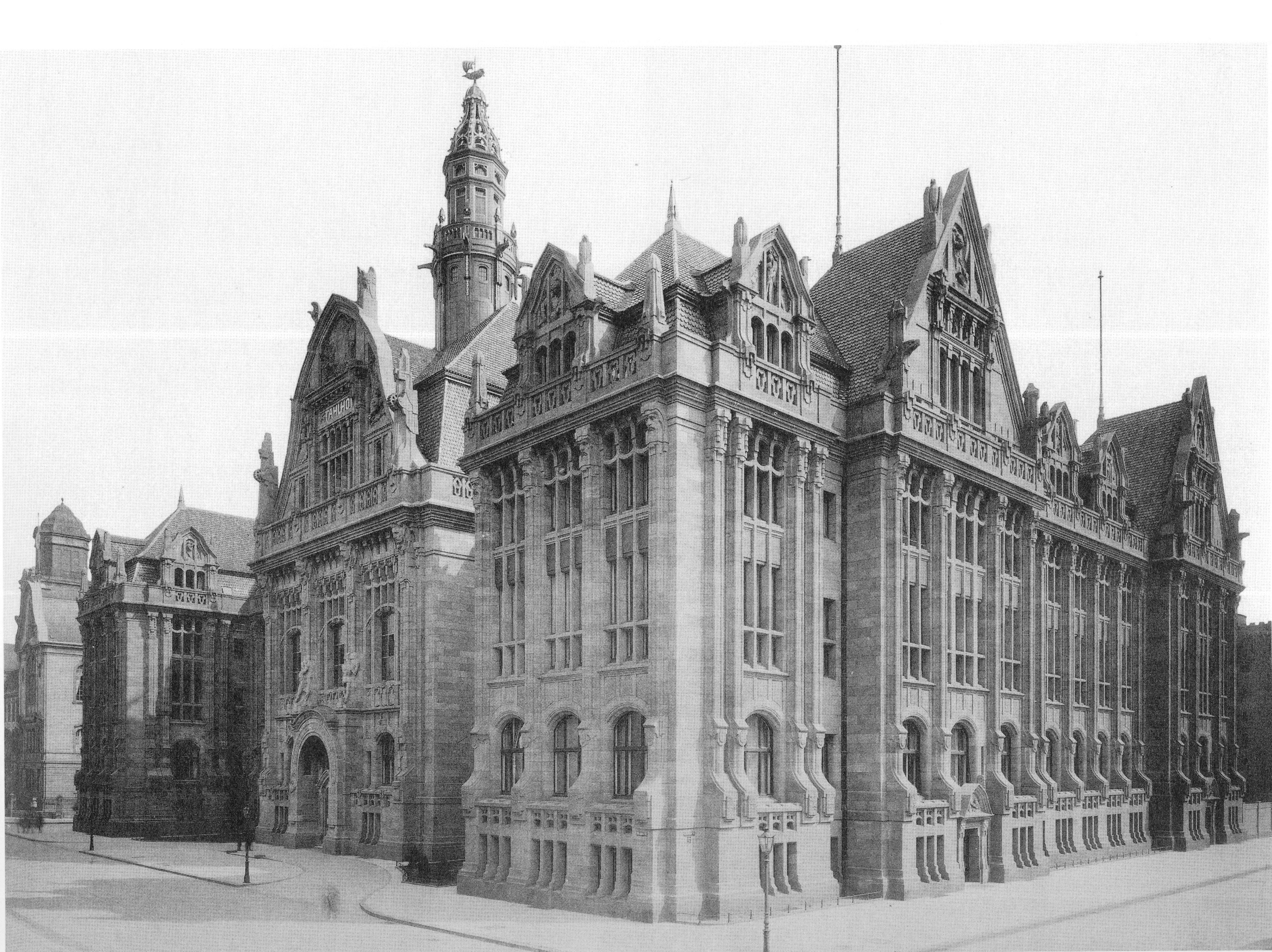
The Stahlhof, about 1909.

The Stahlhof at Bastionstrasse 39 in Düsseldorf, North Rhine-Westphalia, in Germany, is the seat of the Düsseldorf Administrative Court (Verwaltungsgericht Düsseldorf).

== History ==
The robust German steel industry in the Rhineland developed rapidly over the course of the nineteenth century to achieve global prominence before World War I. In 1904, the Deutsche Stahlwerksverband AG ("German Steelworks Association"), a syndicate steel cartel, was founded in Düsseldorf, which was the epicenter of this expansion. The city provided the land for a building housing at least 400-500 employees free of charge. Designed by Johannes Radke and Theo Westbrock, the building was named for the London Stahlhof, and paid for by the region's steel industrialists, who were proud of the demand for their steel products (which they compared to the strength of the medieval north German mercantile Hanseatic League). They installed a symbolic claw at its summit as a sculptural ornament proclaiming their power.

From 8 March 1921 until 25 August 1925, following the First World War, Düsseldorf was a base for French troops during the Occupation of the Rhineland. The French general staff used the confiscated Düsseldorf Stahlhof from 1923 to 1925 as their accommodation and command center for their operations in the Ruhr.

After the Second World War, the building served the Military Governor John Ashworth Barraclough, and from 1 May 1946 as Field Office for the Civil Governor (Regional Commissioner) of the British military government for the province of North Rhine-Westphalia (later for the state of North Rhine-Westphalia), William Asbury (1889-1961). On 23 August 1946, the land of North Rhine-Westphalia was founded here by Military Ordinance No. 46. The fundamental discussions and decisions about the future of the region took place in the Stahlhof.

In the 1920s, a Neue Stahlhof (New Stahlhof) was built on the south side of the Stahlhof to plans of architect Paul Bonatz as an extended administrative building for the steel industry. Also nearby is the Walzstahlhaus (Rolled Steel House), which dates from the late 1930s. Due to the concentration of administrative centers, business associations and interest groups, especially the coal and steel industry, as well as banks and other corporate services providers, Düsseldorf acquired the nickname "Schreibtisch des Ruhrgebiets" (Desk of the Ruhr Area) even before the First World War.

== Description ==
Clad in red sandstone, the administration building achieves its monumental effect from the combination of material, dimensions, structure and symbolism: the facade is accentuated vertically through its elongated pilasters and looks like masonry formed into a "stable grid," thereby emphasizing the heaviness of the structure. The top floor is unusually tall and richly decorated with sculptural features that allegorically depict industry and trade, executed by Adolf Simatschek. Hermann Emil Pohle painted the cycle Career of the Rail in the Stahlhof's conference room.

== Bibliography ==
- Haiko, Peter. Die Architektur des XX. Jahrhunderts – Zeitschrift für moderne Baukunst. Repräsentativer Querschnitt durch die 14 erschienen Jahrgänge 1901 bis 1914. Tübingen: Ernst Wasmuth, 1989. (No. 339; originally published as No. 83 in 1909.) ISBN 3-8030-3039-0.
- Lowis, Kristina. "Stahlhof, Bastionstr. 39," in Roland Kanz, Jürgen Wiener (eds.), Architekturführer Düsseldorf. Berlin: Dietrich Reimer, 2001. p. 31.

== Notes ==
- http://www.vg-duesseldorf.nrw.de/behoerde/gerichtsvorstellung/gebaeude/index.php
