= Eberhard Westhofen =

German architect (1820–1892)

Eberhard Westhofen (1820–1892) was a German architect and building official. He worked as a country architect in Cologne until 1847 and then as 'city architect' in Düsseldorf.

== Life ==
In November 1850 he married Johanna, a née von Thenen and moved into a flat on Bolkerstraße. In 1854 he moved to Wasserstraße by Schwanenspiegel. In 1888 Westhofen retired and received the Order of the Red Eagle IV. Class. Last residence at Grabbeplatz 2, Eberhard Westhofen died in 1892.

== Realisations ==
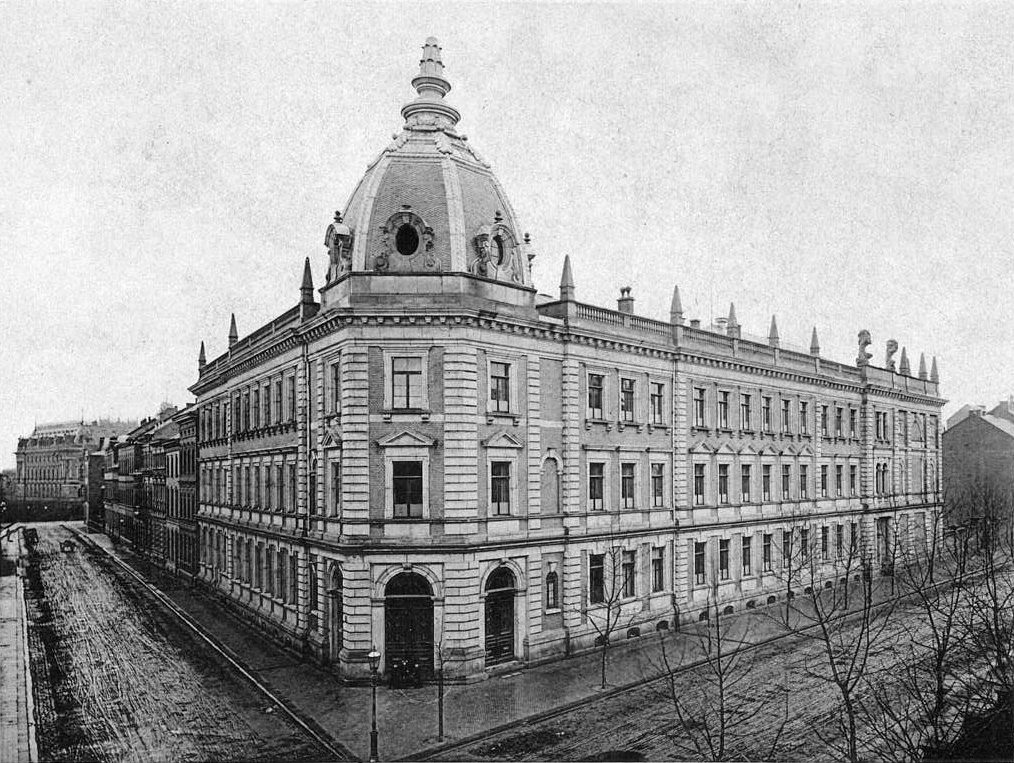
Höhere Bürgerschule am Fürstenwall, corner of Florastraße, 1888.

- Höhere Bürgerschule (Oberrealschule) at Fürstenwall 100, 1888.
- Neues Rathaus, Düsseldorf, 1884
- Kunstgewerbeschule Düsseldorf at Burgplatz, 1883
- Chapel in the Nordfriedhof, 1883
- New gate at Schlossturm Düsseldorf, 1883
- Leichenhaus, Golzheimer Friedhof, 1875 (destroyed during the Second World War)
- Municipal slaughterhouse in Golzheimer Insel, 1874
- Städtisches Lagerhaus, Reuterkaserne 1, 1866.
- Alte Tonhalle Düsseldorf, 1863
- Departemental-Irrenanstalt zu Düsseldorf, from 1879
