= Hermann vom Endt =

German architect

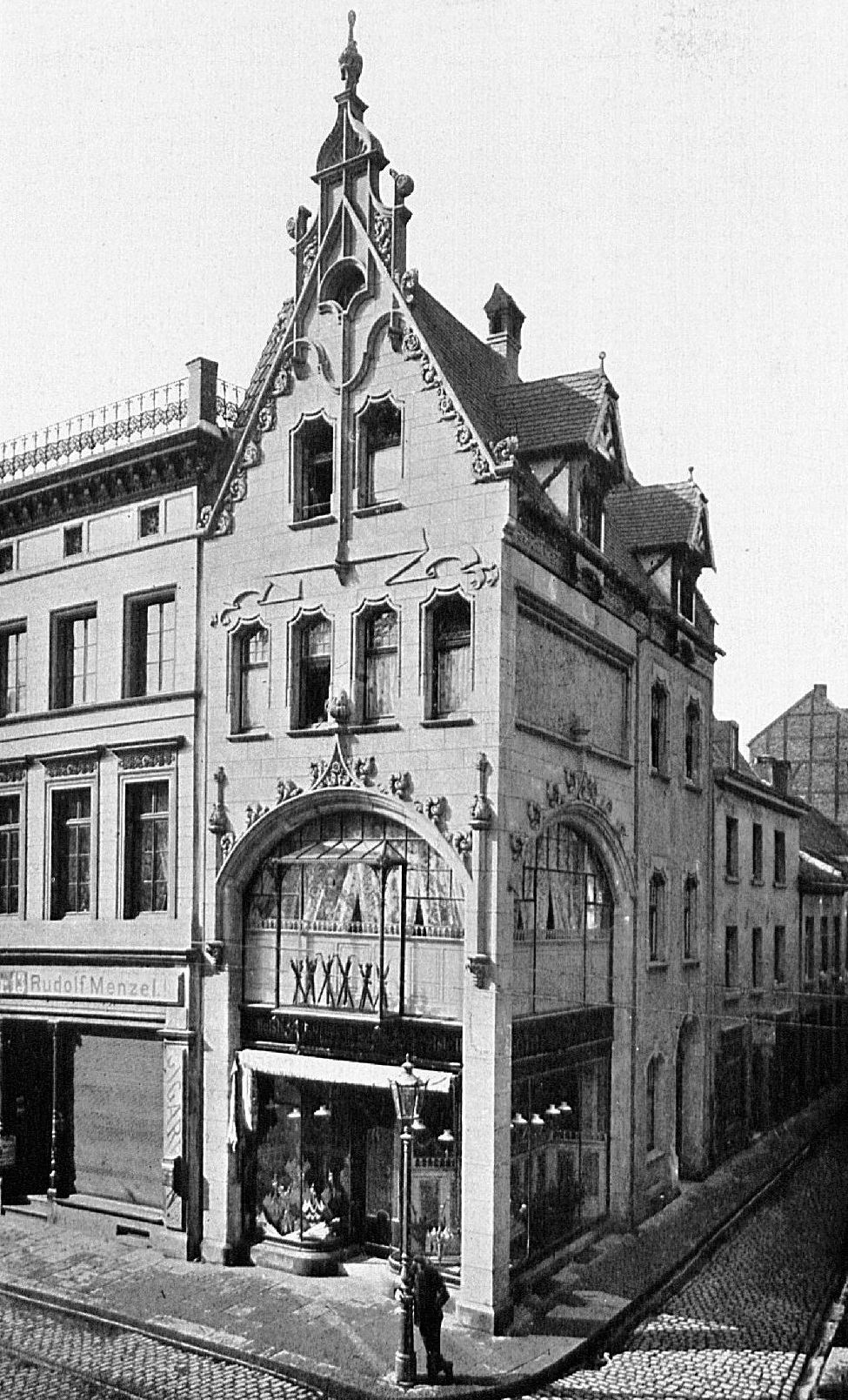
Schneidersches Geschäftshaus, 1902

Hermann vom Endt (18 July 1861 – 27 September 1939) was a German architect.

== Life ==
Born in Dusseldorf, Endt studied at the Kunstakademie Düsseldorf from 1876 to 1878. Baufach und Baukunst under Wilhelm Lotz and became a member of the Malkasten Künstlerverein. After graduating, he first worked in Berlin as an assistant in the studio of the renowned architects Kayser & von Großheim. Later he travelled to Western Europe, Italy and Denmark for further training.

Vom Endt planned more than twenty buildings in Düsseldorf's city centre, mainly commercial and administrative buildings. He also built churches and residential buildings. In addition, he was active as a juror in architectural competitions, on the committee of managing architects of the Association of German Architects.

Vom Endt favoured the historicist Architectural style and used a neoclassicist and Baroque Revival architecture Baroque Revival architecture with a tendency towards monumentality. He thus joined architects such as Richard Bauer, Josef Kleesattel, Carl Moritz, Johannes Radke, Traugott von Saltzwedel, Bruno Schmitz, Bernhard Sehring, Ernst Stahl and Karl Wach, whose buildings shaped the appearance of Düsseldorf's inner city in the age of Wilhelminism.

Endt died in Düsseldorf at the age of 78.

== Family ==
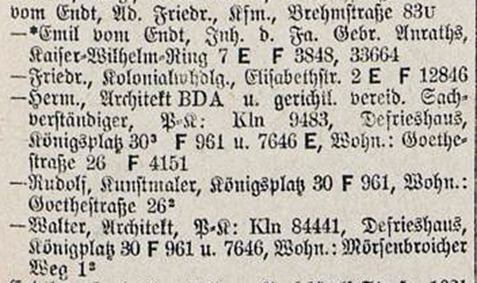
Endt family in address book, 1926

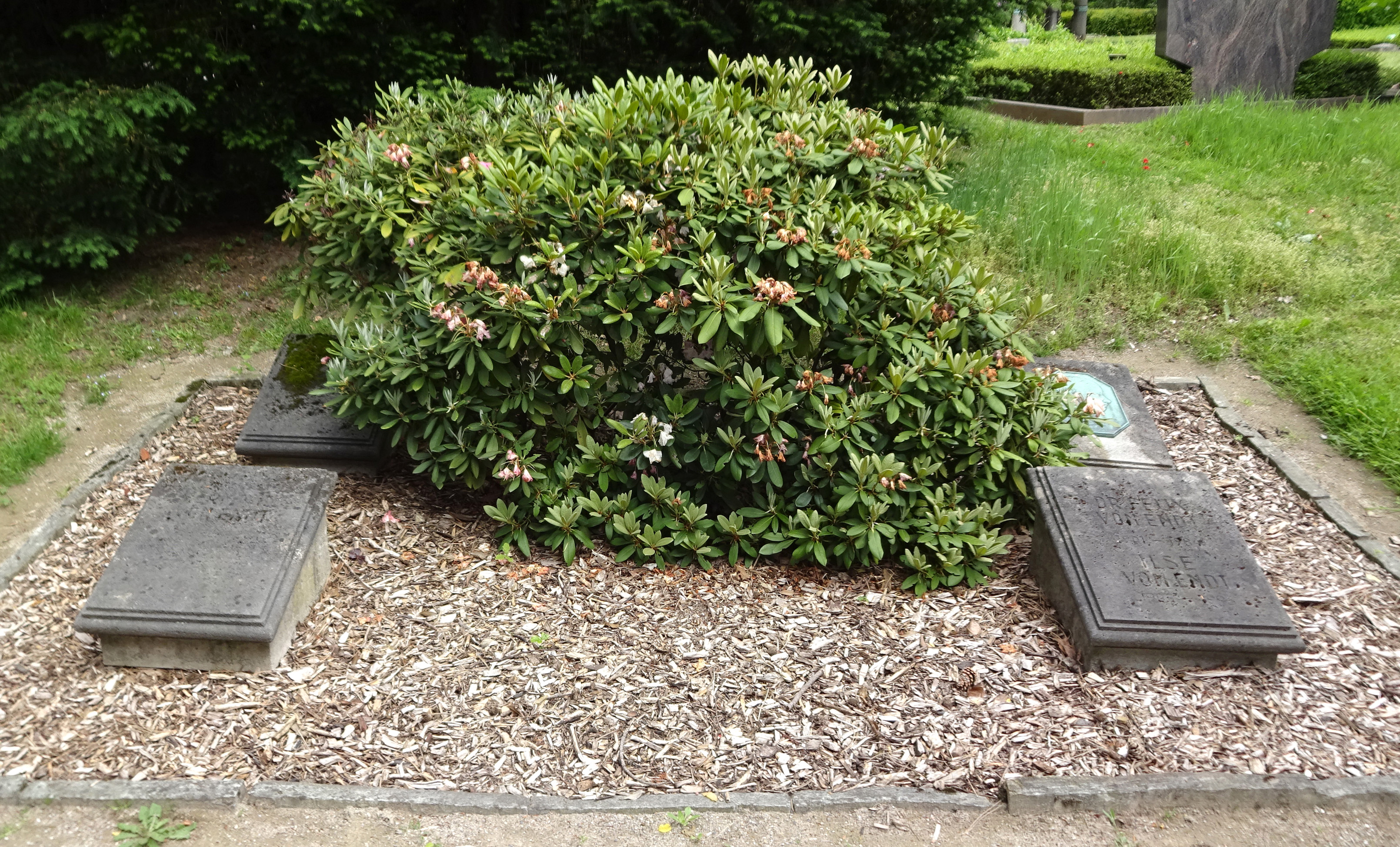
Hermann vom Endt's grave site at the Nordfriedhof Düsseldorf

On 28 January 1891, Endt married Elisabeth Custodis. The son Rudi vom Endt made himself known for his lively and ironic caricatures. His son Walter (31 January 1893 - 1982) followed his father's profession and became an architect.

== Realisations in Düsseldorf ==
- 1894–1896: Landesbank of the Rhine Province, see Friedrichstraße / Fürstenwall old no. 154 (facade preserved)
- around 1897: Schneidersches Geschäftshaus, Wallstraße 29a / Mittelstraße 11 (listed)
- 1898: group of houses at Goethestrasse 16, 18, 20, 22, 24 and 24a (mostly destroyed, few preserved)
- 1898–1899: Apollo-Theater, Königsallee / Adersstraße (demolished in 1966 after several alterations)
- 1900–1901: Haus der Handelskammer, Graf-Adolf-Straße 47 (heavily altered after war damage)
- before 1904: Residential building Ahnfeldstraße 107 (not preserved)
- before 1904: Residential building Schäferstraße 10 (preserved with alterations)
- before 1904: Residential building Reichsstraße 41-43 (today no. 43, preserved with modifications)
- 1904: Residential buildings Kaiser-Friedrich-Ring 7, 8 and 15 (listed)
- 1904–1905: Residential buildings Kaiser-Wilhelm-Ring 3, 4, 5, 6 and 7 (listed)
- 1904–1905: Building of the Allgemeine Ortskrankenkasse (AOK), Kasernenstraße 63 (under preservation order)
- 1905–1907: Building of the Oberpostdirektion Düsseldorf
- 1906: Interior conversion of the Opera House
- 1906: Bank building for the A. Schaaffhausen'schen Bankverein, Breite Straße 29 / Bastionstraße (not preserved).
- 1905–1909: Commercial building of the Düsseldorfer Generalanzeiger (called Girardethaus), Königsallee 27 / Trinkausstraße (altered)
- 1909–1910: House of the Association of German Ironworkers (today Stahlinstitut VDEh), Breite Straße 27
- 1909–1911: Office and commercial building Hohenzollernhaus, Königsallee 14/16 / Schadowstraße
- 1909–1911: Landeshaus der rheinischen Provinzialverwaltung with villa of the Landeshauptmann (later Villa Horion, seat of the president of the North Rhine-Westphalian state parliament)
- 1910–1911: Residential building for the entrepreneur Max Jagenberg, Wasserstraße 8 in Düsseldorf-Unterbilk (under preservation order)
- 1911–1913: Conversions in the Ständehaus of the Rhine Province Provincial Diet
- 1913–1914: Residential and commercial building, Königsallee 46 (listed building)
- 1914: Residential building, Duisburger Straße 44 (under preservation order)
- 1914–1915: Dreimädelbrunnen (listed as a historical monument)
- 1926–1928: Eulerhof housing estate in Flingern, Dorotheenstraße / Lindenstraße / Degerstraße (together with Walter vom Endt and Josef Kleesattel; listed)
- 1926: on the GeSoLei: Exhibition building of the publishing house W. Girardet (Düsseldorfer Nachrichten) and the "Hirschwald-Bücherhaus" of the Hirschwald'sche Buchhandlung, Berlin (buildings were only intended for the duration of one year).
- Provinzial-Feuerversicherungsanstalt der Rheinprovinz, Friedrichstraße 70/74 (departed)
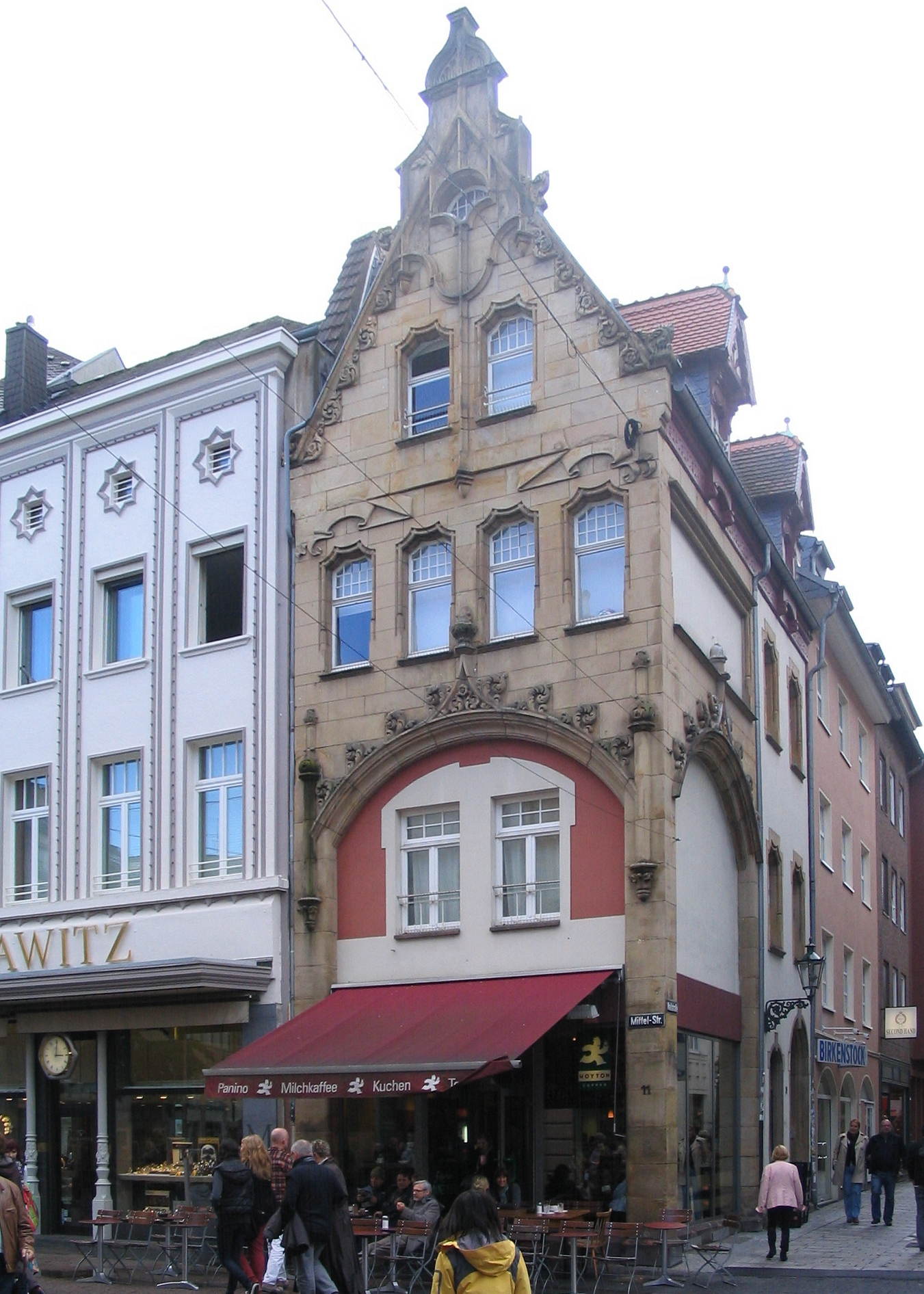
Schneidersches Geschäftshaus

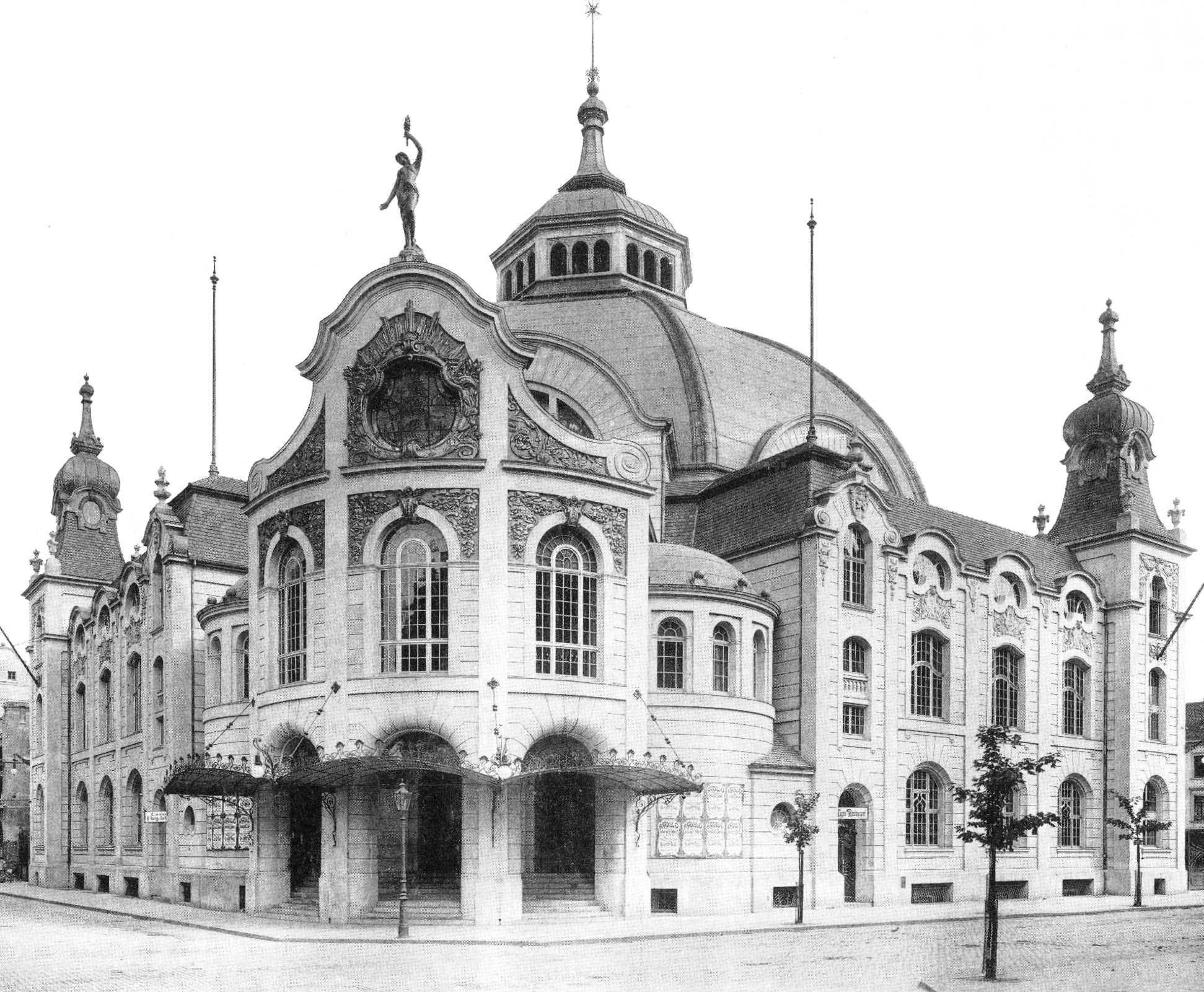
Apollotheater

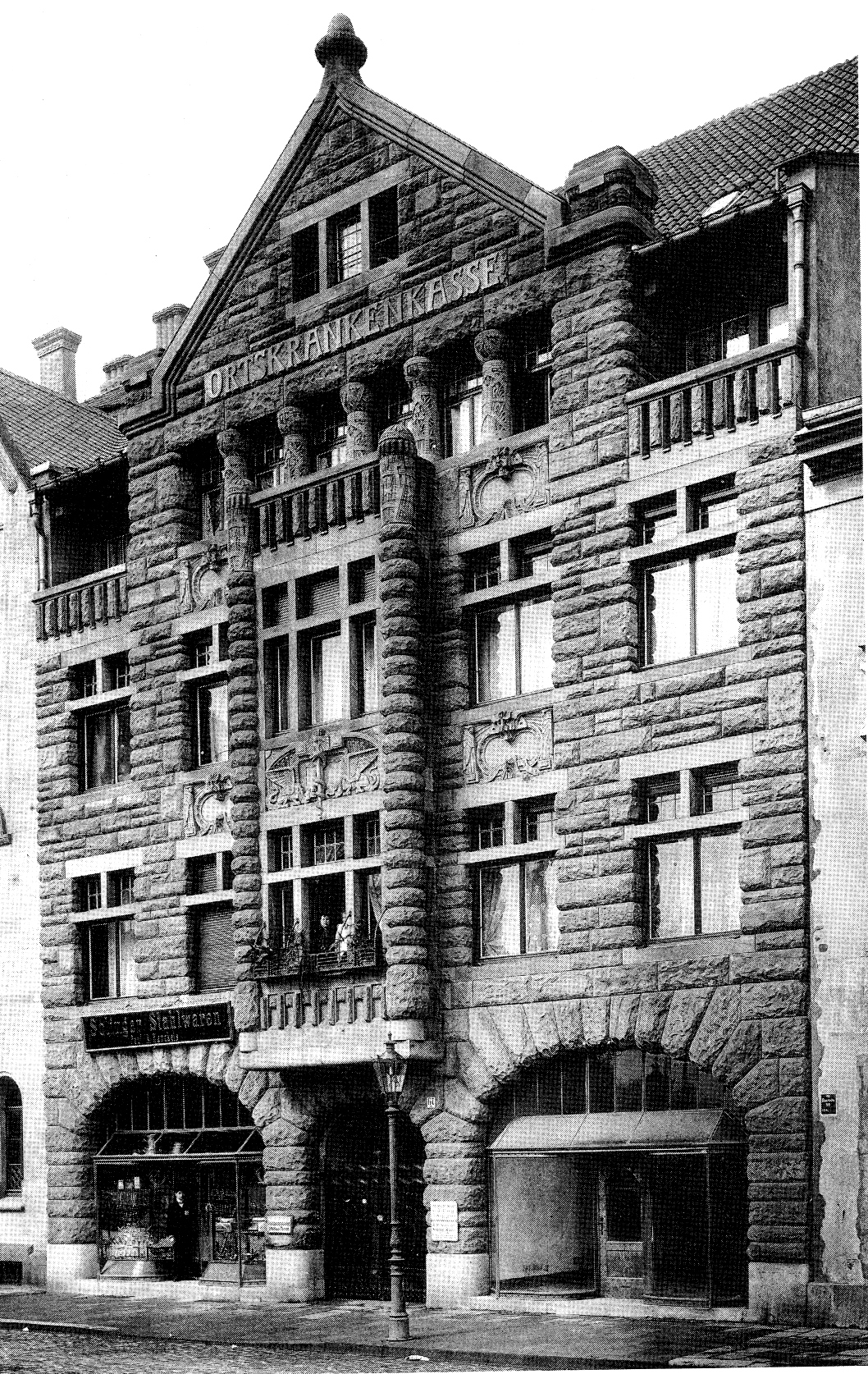
AOK-Gebäude

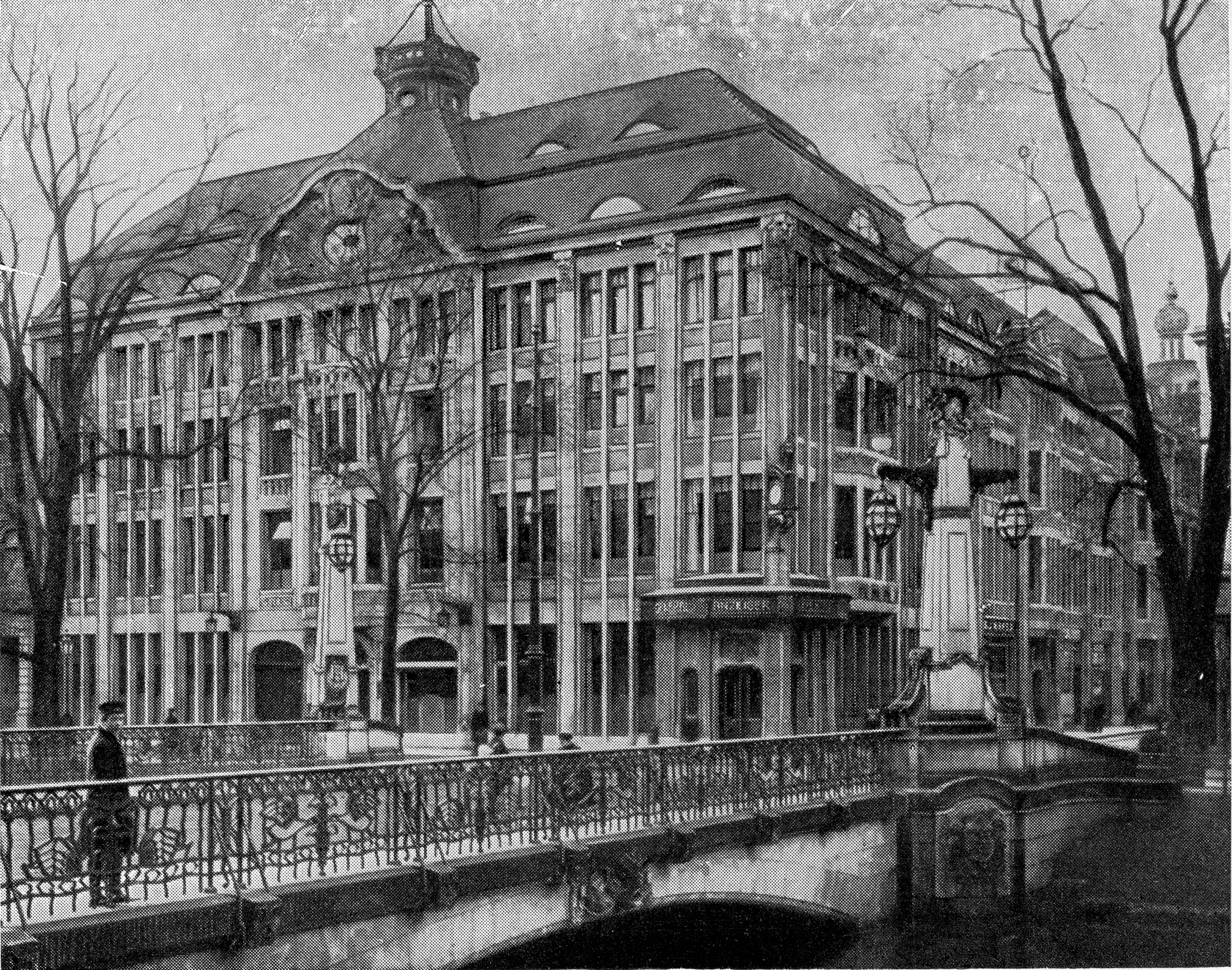
Girardethaus

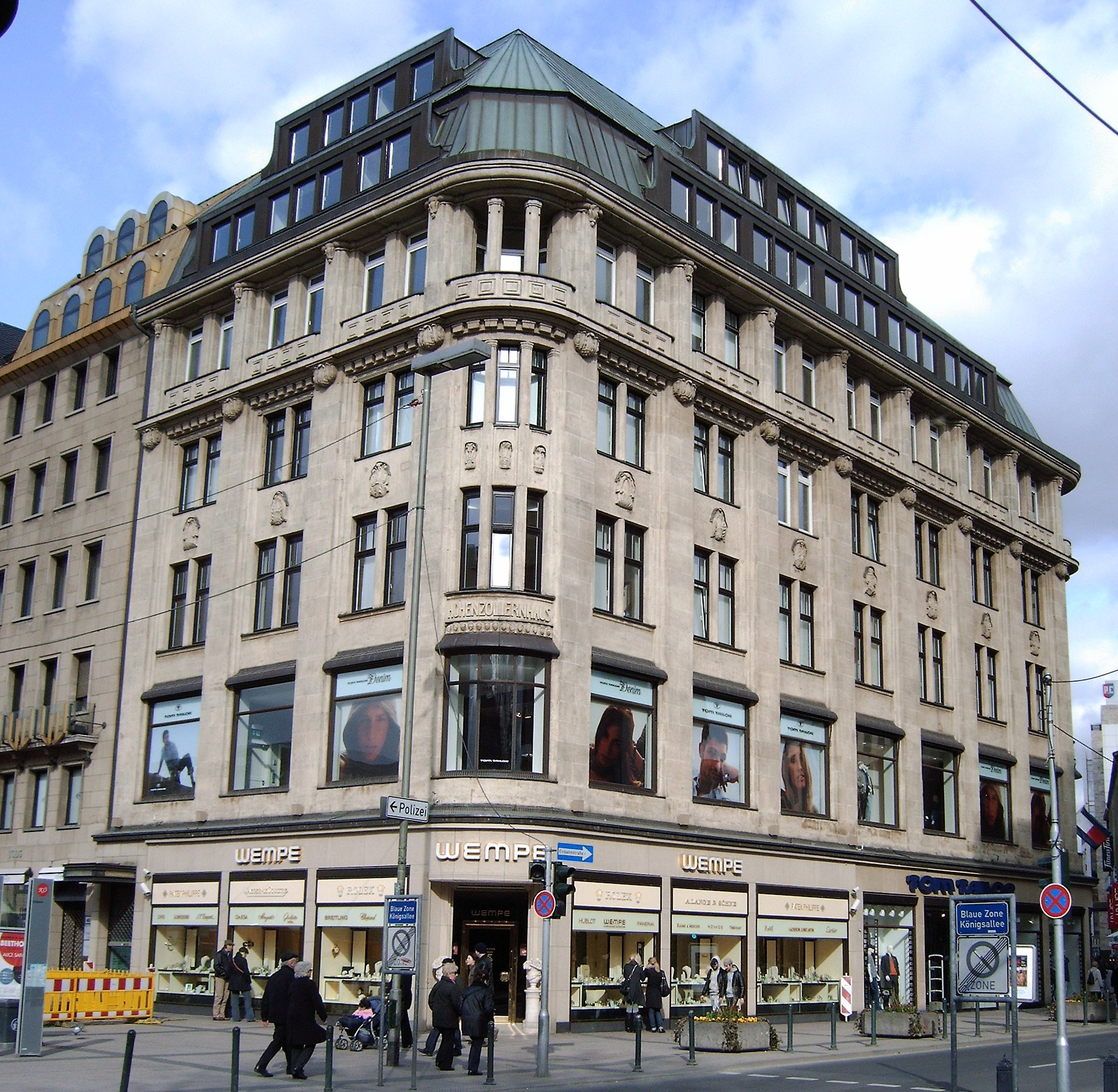
Hohenzollernhaus

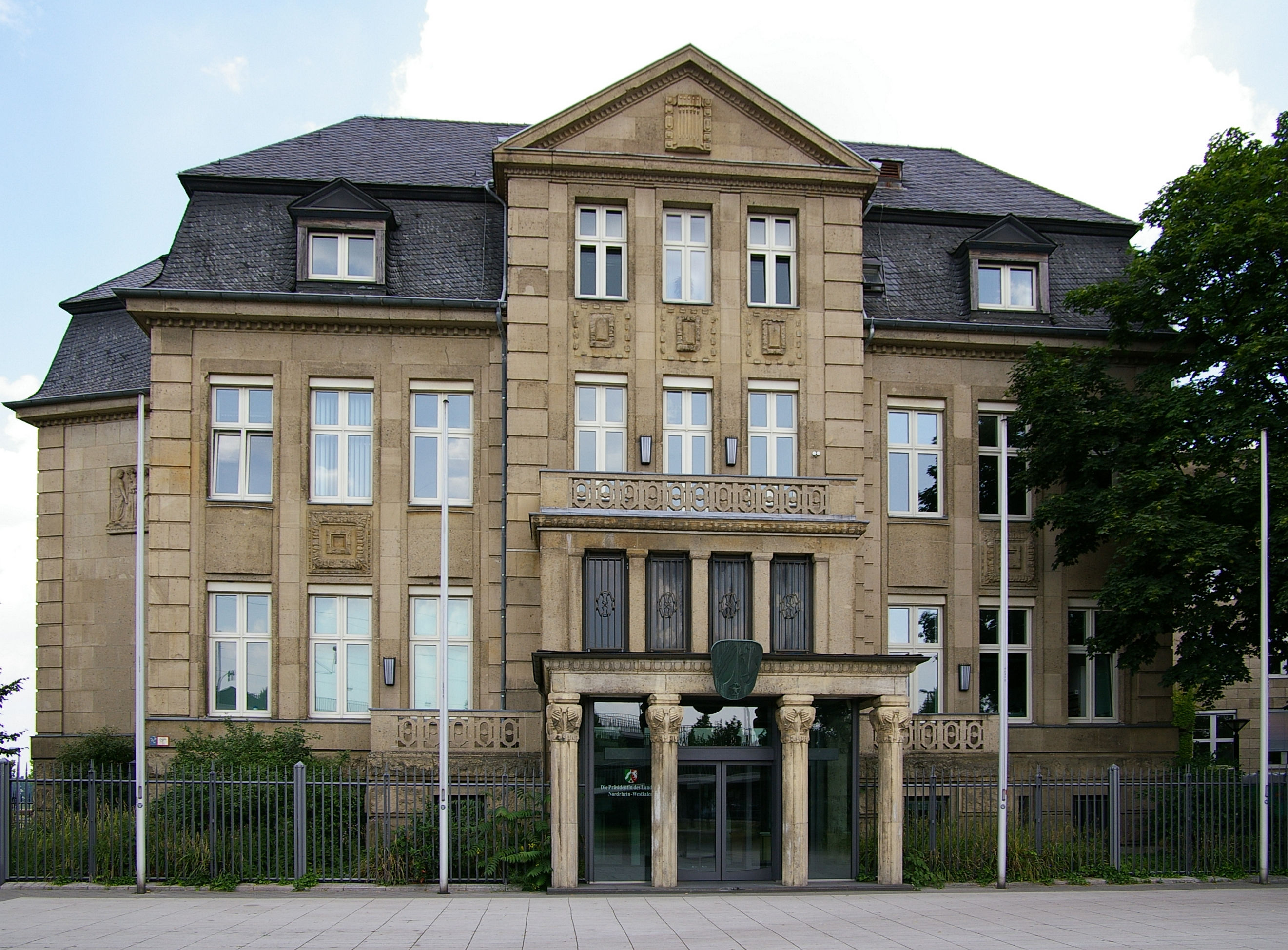
Villa Horion

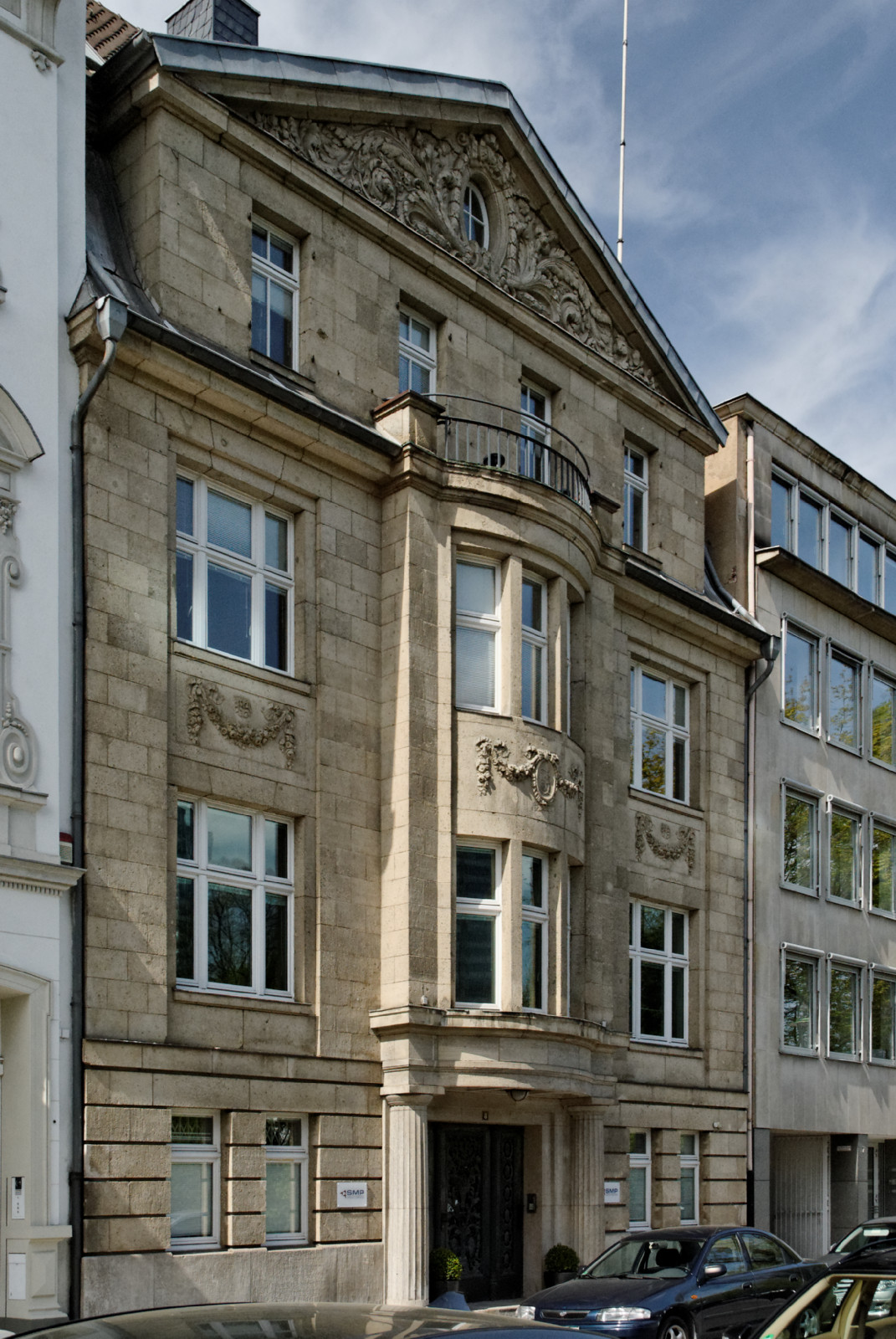
Haus Wasserstraße 8

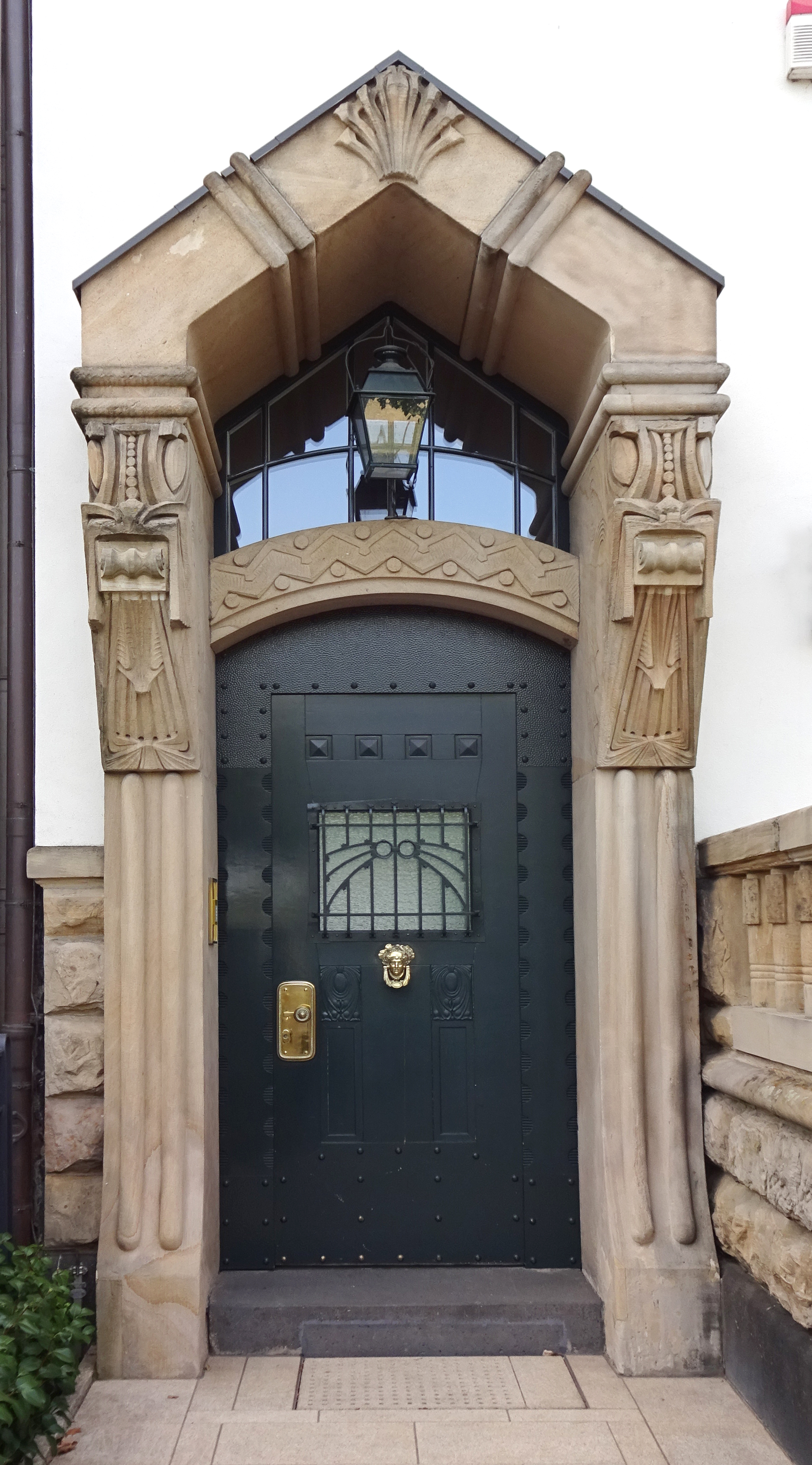
Eingangsportal Kaiser-Friedrich-Ring 15
