= A Question of Faith (2000 film) =

- Directed by: Tim Disney
- Written by: Tim Disney
- Story by: Rachel Ingalls
- Produced by: Bill Haney
- Starring: Martha Hackett; Bernard Hill; Daniel von Bargen
- Cinematography: Claudio Rocha
- Edited by: Nancy Richardson
- Music by: Steven Taylor
- Release date: 2000
- Running time: 92 minutes
- Country: United States
- Language: English

A Question of Faith (also titled Blessed Art Thou) is a 2000 American fantasy drama film directed by Tim Disney and starring Martha Hackett, Bernard Hill and Daniel von Bargen.

== Cast ==
- Bernard Hill as Abbott Frederick
- Paul Guilfoyle as Brother Francis
- Daniel von Bargen as Father Adrian
- Naveen Andrews as Brother William
- Joe Spano as Dr. Duncan
- Martha Hackett as Brother Anselm
- Michael Cudlitz as Brother James
- David Thornton as Elmo
- Brent Hinkley as Brother Dominic
- Kenneth Tigar as Robert
- Randy Oglesby as Eustace
- Lupe Ontiveros
- Jorge Cervera Jr.

== Reception ==
The film has a 67% rating on Rotten Tomatoes based on six reviews.

Scott Tobias of The A.V. Club described the film as “a work of astonishing banality”.

Todd McCarthy of Variety wrote in his review: “But pic feels more like sitcom than genuinely spiritual comedy, making TV/cable and video much more suitable venues than theatrical release”.
