= Paul Guilfoyle =

American actor (born 1949)

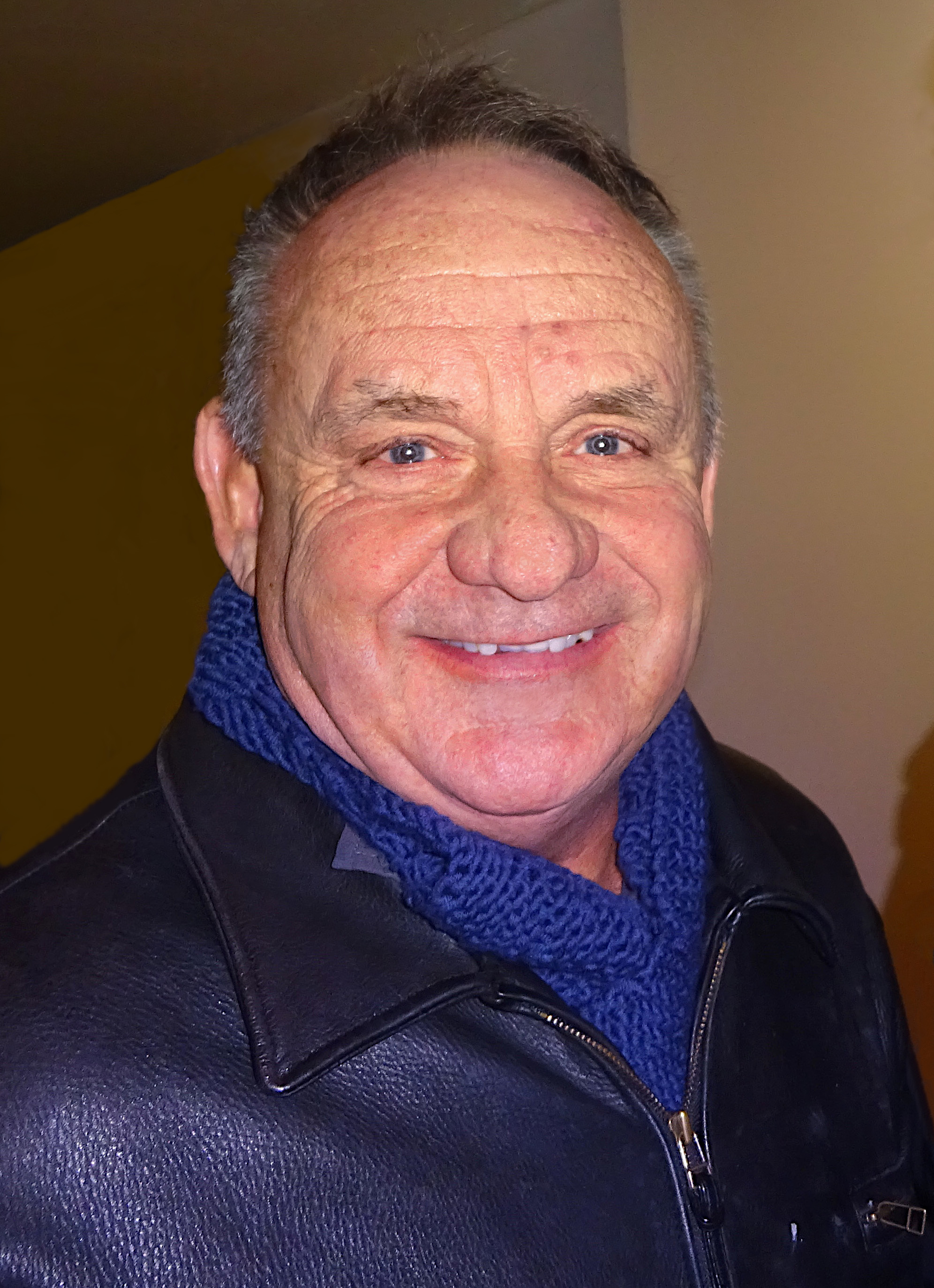
- Guilfoyle in 2016
- Born: Paul Vincent Guilfoyle; April 28, 1949 (age 77); Boston, Massachusetts, U.S.
- Occupation: Actor
- Years active: 1975–present
- Spouse: Lisa Giobbi (m. 1989)
- Children: 1

Paul Vincent Guilfoyle (/ˈɡɪlfɔɪl/) (born April 28, 1949) is an American character actor. He was a regular cast member of the CBS crime drama CSI: Crime Scene Investigation, on which he played Captain Jim Brass from 2000 to 2014. He returned for the series finale, "Immortality", in 2015. He also returned for two episodes in the sequel CSI: Vegas.

== Early life ==
Guilfoyle was born in Boston, Massachusetts. He attended Boston College High School and spoke at the 2005 commencement of the school's seniors. He would later appear in Spotlight, which features the school. Guilfoyle graduated from Lehigh University in 1972.

He is a member of The Actors Studio and established a substantial theatrical reputation on and off Broadway, including 12 years with the Theatre Company of Boston, appearances on Broadway include in David Rabe's The Basic Training of Pavlo Hummel, Those The River Keeps, Richard III with Al Pacino, David Mamet's Glengarry Glen Ross, Death Defying Acts, and Search and Destroy.

== Career ==
Guilfoyle appeared in Three Men and a Baby, and in an early episode of Crime Story, where he played a criminal who takes a hostage, getting into a shootout with the Major Crimes Unit.

His television appearances most notably include guest roles on Miami Vice, Law & Order, Wiseguy, New York Undercover, Ally McBeal and Justice League Unlimited as Travis Morgan, the Warlord. His film credits are numerous, spanning nearly three decades. His appearances in notable films include Howard the Duck, Wall Street, Celtic Pride, Beverly Hills Cop II, Quiz Show, Final Analysis, Hoffa, Mrs. Doubtfire, Air Force One, Striptease, Amistad, The Negotiator, Extreme Measures, Session 9, Primary Colors, and L.A. Confidential.

Guilfoyle also appears in Alter Bridge's video for their single "Broken Wings", and the HBO original film Live from Baghdad.

Guilfoyle is best known for his role as L.V.P.D. Captain James "Jim" Brass in the CBS police drama CSI: Crime Scene Investigation, which he performed from the show's inception in 2000.

In 2014, it was announced that Guilfoyle would be leaving CSI: Crime Scene Investigation after 14 years, but returned in 2015 for the two-hour series finale "Immortality".

In 2020, he guest-starred on Star Trek: Discovery in the two-part story "Terra Firma", as Carl, the humanoid avatar of the Guardian of Forever.

== Personal life ==
In 1989, Guilfoyle married choreographer and aerial artist Lisa Giobbi. They have one child and live in New York City.

== Filmography ==
=== Film ===
Year	Title	Role	Notes
1975	Next Door	Unknown	Short film
1976	The Murderer	Brock	Short film
1981	The Dark End of the Street	Unknown	
1986	Howard the Duck	Lieutenant Welker	
1986	Billy Galvin	Nolan	
1987	Beverly Hills Cop II	Nikos Thomopolis	
1987	Three Men and a Baby	Vince	
1987	Wall Street	Stone Livingston	
1988	The Serpent and the Rainbow	Dr. Andrew Cassedy	
1989	Dealers	Lee Peters	
1990	The Local Stigmatic	Ray	
1990	Cadillac Man	Jack "Little Jack" Turgeon	
1991	True Colors	John Laury	
1992	Final Analysis	Mike O'Brien	
1992	Hoffa	Ted Harmon, Reporter	
1993	The Night We Never Met	Sparrow's Nest Salesman	
1993	Naked in New York	Roman, Jake's Father	
1993	Mother's Boys	Mark Kaplan, Robert's Attorney	
1993	Mrs. Doubtfire	Head Chef	
1994	Little Odessa	Boris Volkoff	
1994	Quiz Show	Lishman	
1995	Gospa	Miodrag Dobrovic	
1995	Cafe Society	Anthony Liebler	
1996	Manny & Lo	Country House Owner	
1996	Looking for Richard	2nd Murderer	Documentary film
1996	A Couch in New York	Dennis	
1996	Celtic Pride	Kevin O'Grady	
1996	Heaven's Prisoners	Detective Magelli	
1996	Striptease	Malcolm Moldovsky	
1996	Extreme Measures	Dr. Jeffrey Manko	
1996	Ransom	FBI Agent Wallace	
1997	Night Falls on Manhattan	McGovern	
1997	L.A. Confidential	Mickey Cohen	
1997	Air Force One	Chief of Staff Lloyd Shepherd	
1997	Amistad	Attorney	
1998	Peppermills	Owner of Restaurant	Short film
1998	Primary Colors	Howard Ferguson	
1998	The Negotiator	Detective Nathan Roenick	Uncredited
1998	One Tough Cop	Frankie 'Hot' Salvino	
1999	In Dreams	Detective Jack Kay	
1999	Entropy	Andy	
1999	Anywhere but Here	George Franklin	
1999	Random Hearts	Dick Montoya	
2000	A Question of Faith	Francis	
2000	Company Man	Officer Hickle	
2001	Hemingway, the Hunter of Death	Alex Smith	
2001	Session 9	Bill Griggs	
2002	Pharoh's Heart	Angelo	Short film
2004	Tempesta	Taddeo Rossi	
2008	American Violet	Judge Belmont	
2012	That Guy... Who Was in That Thing	Himself	
2015	Spotlight	Pete Conley	
2016	Pandemic	Dr. Greer	
2019	Turnover	Peter Parveau	
2019	William	Bob Claybourn	
2020	Recondition	Gerry Sanders	Short film
2021	Don't Look Up	General Themes	
2021	The Mothership		Filmed in 2021, ultimately unreleased
2022	The Good House	Henry Barlow	
2022	The Man from Rome	Monsignor Paolo Spada	
2024	Polara	Billy	
2024	Arthur the King	Charlie	
2025	Any Day Now	Marty Lyons	
2026	Over Your Dead Body	Michael	

Key
†	Denotes films that have not yet been released

=== Television ===
Year	Title	Role	Notes
1981	Ephriam McDowell's Kentucky Ride	Unknown	Television film
1986	American Playhouse	Unknown	Episode: "Roanoak: Part 1"
1986	Crime Story	Deranged Gunman	Episode: "Hide and Go Thief"
1987	Spenser: For Hire	Ross Bates	Episode: "The Man Who Wasn't There"
1987	Miami Vice	Milton Glantz	Episode: "Death and the Lady"
1988	Kate & Allie	Benny Rinaldi	Episode: "My Day with Paul Newman"
1988	Internal Affairs	The Watcher	Television film
1988	Wiseguy	Calvin Hollis	3 episodes
1989	Unsub	Joe	Episode: "White Bone Demon"
1989	Miami Vice	John Baker	Episode: "Victims of Circumstance"
1989	The Equalizer	Max Gorman	Episode: "Heart of Justice"
1989	A Man Called Hawk	Stan	Episode: "Life After Death"
1989	Big Time	Ted	Television film
1989	Kojak: Fatal Flaw	Hoods	Television film
1990	Curiosity Kills	Ortley	Television film
1990	Against the Law	Shraker	Episode: "Pilot"
1990	Law & Order	Anthony Scalisi	Episode: "Everybody's Favorite Bagman"
1991	The Great Pretender	Martin Brinkman	Television film
1991	Darrow	Bert Franklin	Television film
1991	Civil Wars	Jerry Bennett	Episode: "Pilot"
1992	Notorious	Norman Prescott	Television film
1992	Those Secrets	Leonard	Television film
1992	Unnatural Pursuits	Larry Leitz	Episode: "I'm the Author"
1992	Dead Ahead: The Exxon Valdez Disaster	Commander Steve Mccall, US Coast Guard	Television film
1993	Anna Lee: Headcase	Dr. Frank	Television film
1993	Class of '61	Unknown	Television film
1993	Fallen Angels	Steve Prokowski	Episode: "Dead-End for Delia"
1994	Amelia Earhart: The Final Flight	Paul Mantz	Television film
1994	M.A.N.T.I.S.	Michael Rompath	Episode: "Soldier of Misfortune"
1994	New York Undercover	Remmy Powers	Episode: "Eyewitness Blues"
1996	September	Conrad Tucker	Television film
1996	C.P.W.	Detective	2 episodes
1996	The Burning Zone	Dr. Arthur Glyndon	Episode: "Pilot"
1997	New York Undercover	Alex Pratt	Episode: "Hubris"
1997	Path to Paradise	Lou Napoli	Television film
1998	Ally McBeal	Harold Lee	Episode: "Theme of Life"
1998	Exiled: A Law & Order Movie	Detective Sammy Kurtz	Television film
2000	Now and Again	Ed Bernstadt	Episode: "The Eggman Cometh"
2000	Secret Agent Man	Brubeck	Recurring role
2000–2014	CSI: Crime Scene Investigation	Captain Jim Brass	Main cast
2001	Night Visions	John (segment "The Passenger List")	Episode: "The Passenger List/The Bokor"
2002	Live from Bagdad	Ed Turner	Television film
2003	Coyote Waits	FBI Agent Jay Kennedy	Television film
2005	Justice League Unlimited	Travis Morgan / Warlord	Voice, episode: "Chaos at the Earth's Core"
2015	The Fourth Man	Liska 'The Bear'	Miniseries; episode: "#1.2"
2015	CSI: Immortality	Jim Brass	Television film
2015	Stanistan	Ambassador Matthews	Television film
2016	Colony	Quayle	Recurring role
2017	Blindspot	Rosmond Ott	Episode: "Gunplay Ricochet"
2017–2018	The Good Fight	Henry Rindell	Recurring role
2019	The Morning Show	Reid	Episode: "Lonely at the Top"
2019	A Million Little Things	Lenny	Episode: "Daisy"
2020	Star Trek: Discovery	Carl, The Guardian of Forever	2 episodes
2021	CSI: Vegas	Jim Brass	2 episodes
2023	Julia	Frank Bludger	2 episodes
2024	Evil	Archbishop Kirby	2 episodes
2026	Law & Order SVU	Judge Walter Conover	1 episode

=== Video games ===
Year	Title	Voice Role
2003	CSI: Crime Scene Investigation	Captain Jim Brass
2004	CSI: Crime Scene Investigation - Dark Motives	Captain Jim Brass
2006	CSI: 3 Dimensions of Murder	Captain Jim Brass
2007	CSI: Crime Scene Investigation - Hard Evidence	Captain Jim Brass
2009	Prototype	Dr. Raymond McMullen
2009	CSI: Crime Scene Investigation - Deadly Intent	Captain Jim Brass
2010	CSI: Fatal Conspiracy	Captain Jim Brass

== Awards and nominations ==
Year	Title	Accolade	Category	Results
2002	CSI: Crime Scene Investigation	Screen Actors Guild Award	Outstanding Performance by an Ensemble in a Drama Series	Nominated
2003	CSI: Crime Scene Investigation	Screen Actors Guild Award	Outstanding Performance by an Ensemble in a Drama Series	Nominated
2004	CSI: Crime Scene Investigation	Screen Actors Guild Award	Outstanding Performance by an Ensemble in a Drama Series	Nominated
2005	CSI: Crime Scene Investigation	Screen Actors Guild Award	Outstanding Performance by an Ensemble in a Drama Series	Won
2016	Spotlight	Independent Spirit Award	Best Ensemble	Won
