= William (film) =

- Directed by: Tim Disney
- Written by: Tim Disney; J.T. Allen
- Produced by: Bill Haney; Jonathan DuBois; Amar Balaggan
- Starring: Will Brittain
- Cinematography: Nelson Talbot; Graham Talbot
- Edited by: Asim Nuraney
- Music by: Craig Wedren
- Production company: William Productions
- Distributed by: Dada Films
- Release date: April 12, 2019
- Running time: 102 minutes
- Country: United States
- Language: English

William is a 2019 American adventure drama film written by Tim Disney and J.T. Allen, directed by Disney and starring Will Brittain.

== Synopsis ==
Two biologists remotely clone a living Neanderthal they name William as a way to study the organic and intelligence differences between Neanderthals and Homo sapiens. The "parents" soon divorce due to differences of opinion on whether to raise William as a normal person or as a lab rat. When William turns 18, he begins to face harsh reality as some bully him and treat him with derision. He saves a female friend who desperately tries to help him avoid joining his ancestors, who had been wiped out 40,000 years before by the very species that raised him.

== Cast ==
- Maria Dizzia as Dr. Barbara Sullivan
- Will Brittain as William Age 18
- Waleed Zuaiter as Dr. Julian Reed
- Susan Park as Sarah
- Callum Airlie as William at 10
- Beth Grant as Dr. Godwin Thomas
- Paul Guilfoyle
- Morgan Taylor Campbell as Judy

== Production ==
The film was shot in Vancouver.

== Release ==
The film was released on April 12, 2019.

== Reception ==
The film has a 42% rating on Rotten Tomatoes based on twelve reviews.

Nick Allen of RogerEbert.com awarded the film one and a half stars and wrote, "Yet in spite of this curious premise, William simply devolves into a drab, moody morality tale for parents about not treating your kids like test subjects."

Dennis Harvey of Variety gave the film a negative review and wrote, "Tim Disney’s film strikes a bland compromise between science-fantasy, suspense-melodrama and family entertainment, developing no element to a level that generates more than mild interest."

Frank Scheck of The Hollywood Reporter also gave the film a negative review and wrote, "Deadly earnest in its highbrow seriousness, William would seem ripe for parody, except that Encino Man got there first."
