= Tim Disney =

American filmmaker (born 1960 or 1961)

Timothy J. Disney (born 1960 or 1961) is an American filmmaker. He co-wrote and directed the film William (2019). He also wrote and directed Blessed Art Thou (2000). He also directed American Violet (2008).

He is a member of the Disney family, the grandson of Roy O. Disney, son of Roy E. Disney, and grandnephew of Walt Disney. From 2014 to 2022, he served as the chairman of the California Institute of the Arts board.

== Filmography as director ==
- A Question of Faith (2000)
- Tempesta (2004)
- American Violet (2008)
- William (2019)
