= Apollo-Theater (Düsseldorf) =

Coordinates: 51°13′05″N 6°46′45″E

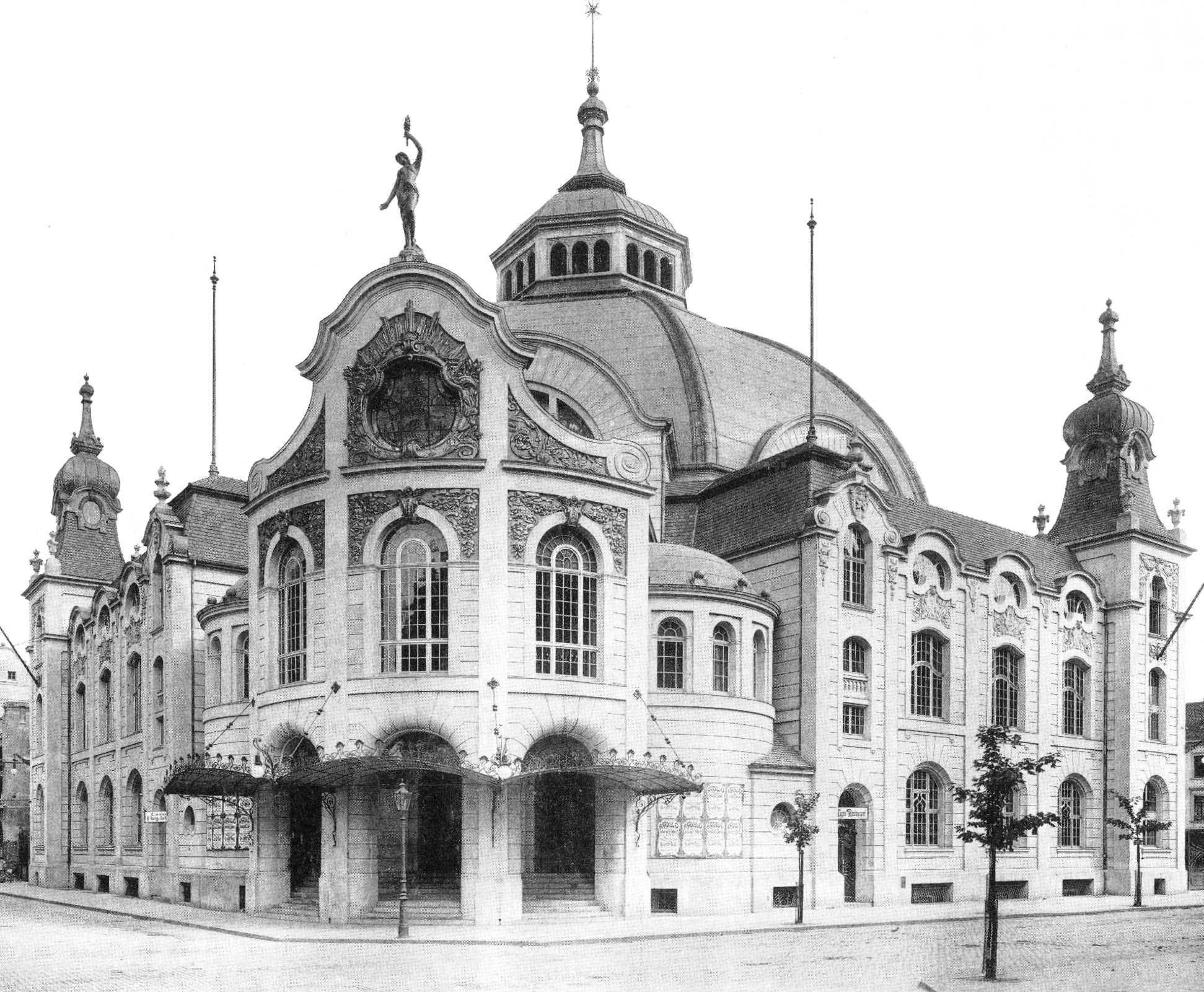
An image of Apollo-Theater (Düsseldorf)

Apollo-Theater was a theatre in Düsseldorf, North Rhine-Westphalia, Germany.

Located on Königsallee, at the corner of Adersstraße, in Düsseldorf, the theatre existed from 1899 to 1966. The neo-baroque building was opened on 16 December 1899 after one and a half years of construction. The theater was built on the site of the former Cologne-Minden Railway Company station, designed by the Düsseldorf architect Hermann vom Endt. It was intended to host operettas and comedies, as well as variety and circus performances.
