= Johannes Radke =

German architect

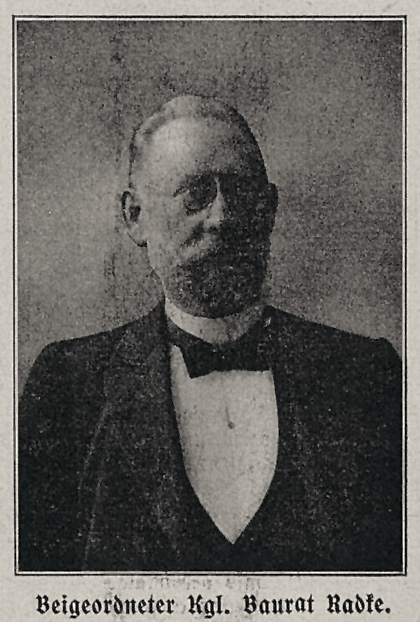
Johannes Radke, 1907

Johannes Radke (7 August 1853 – 1938) was a German architect, building official and councilor in Düsseldorf.

== Life ==
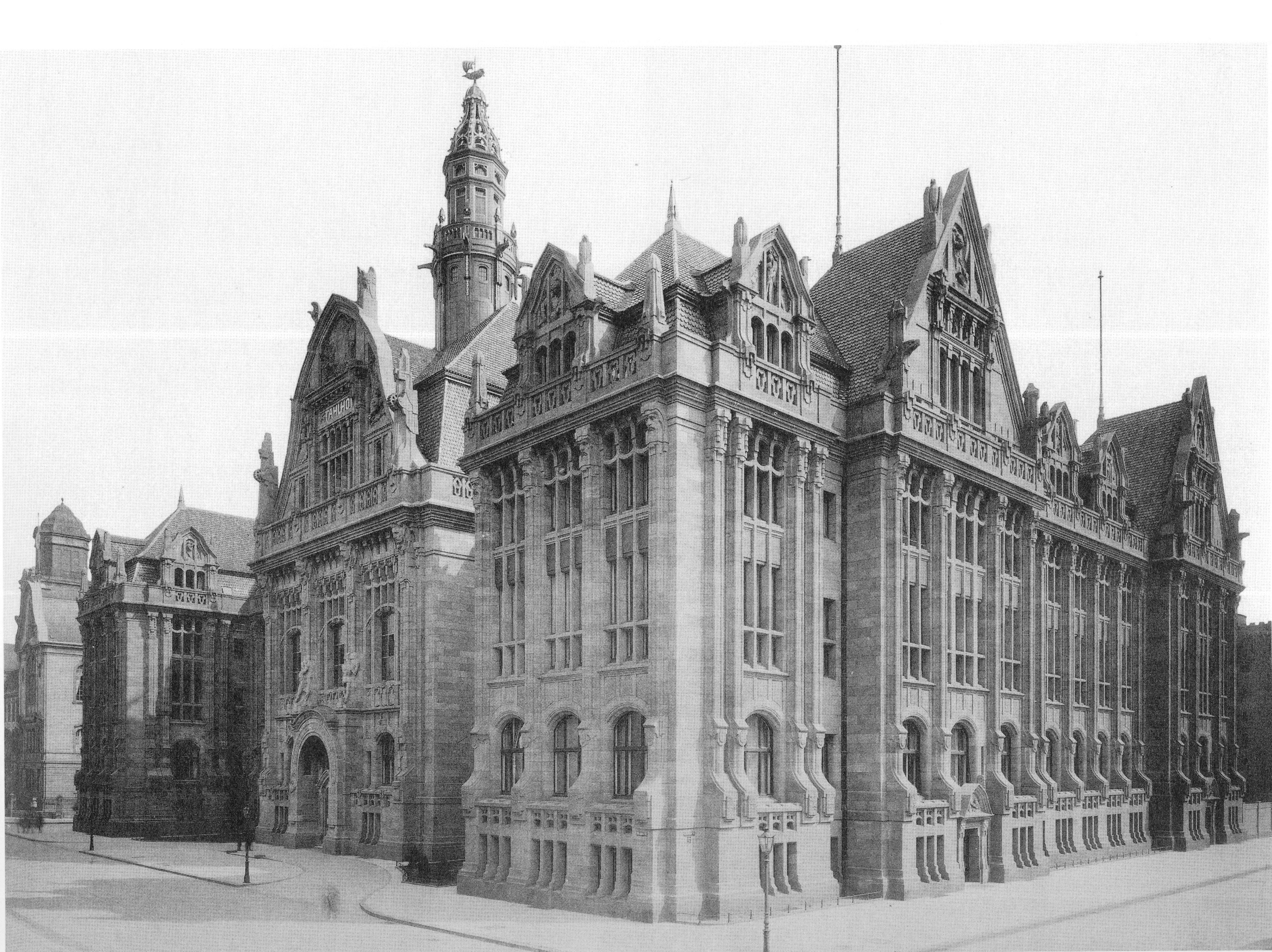
Stahlhof in Düsseldorf, Foto ca. 1909

Born in Margonin, Radke, son of the Lutheran preacher Johann Friedrich Daniel Lebrecht Radke (1841-1874), completed his schooling in 1874 at the Royal Grammar School in Bydgoszcz with the desire to study construction. After his studies, he worked in Berlin in the building administration of the Kaiserliche Reichspost as "Kaiserlicher Postbauinspektor" (Imperial Postal Building Inspector), before being appointed city building inspector in Düsseldorf in 1900. Between 1901 and 1921, he was also municipal alderman there. In these functions, he influenced the construction of the Hafen auf der Lausward and numerous other projects, such as the Rheinufervorschiebung, the development of the Oberkassel district in the course of the Elektrifizierung der Düsseldorfer Straßenbahnen (K-Bahn) and the 1902 Industrie- und Gewerbeausstellung Düsseldorf.

He designed numerous public buildings for Düsseldorf. The most important of these are numerous buildings of the Klinikumkomplex an der Moorenstraße, the Stahlhof, the Luisen-Gymnasium Düsseldorf and the Görres-Gymnasium. The old Rheinuferpromenade including the Düsselschlösschen from 1900 to 1902, of which the bank protection wall, parapets, stairs, banisters, an altan and the water level clock are still preserved today, also goes back to Radke. Radke had already gained international attention before his time in Düsseldorf through the construction of the German exhibition pavilions for the World Exposition in Chicago in 1893 (World's Columbian Exposition) and the Paris Exposition Universelle.

Radke was a member of the Architekten- und Ingenieurverein zu Berlin-Brandenburg.

== Work ==
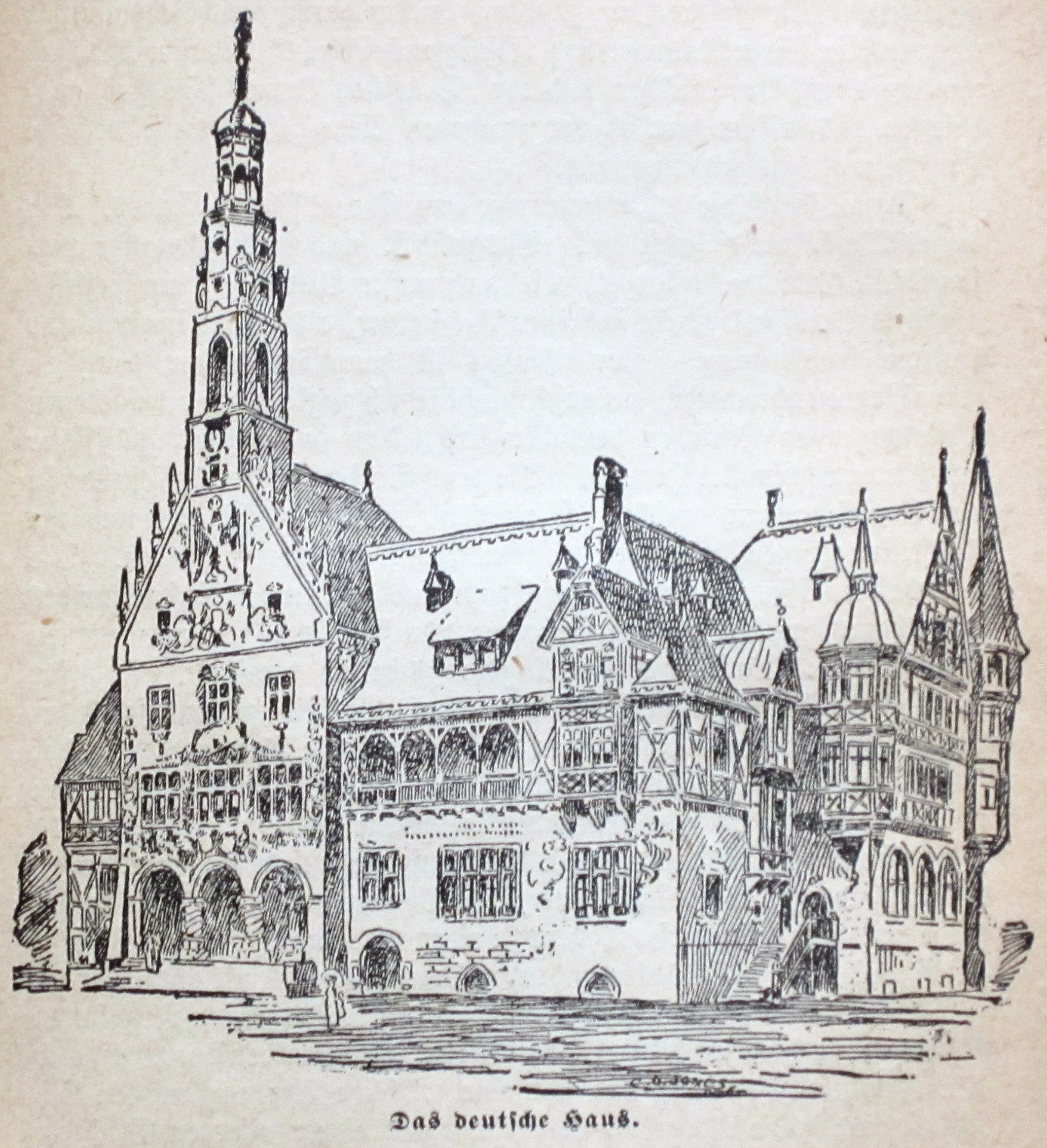
Deutsches Haus auf der Weltausstellung 1893 in Chicago

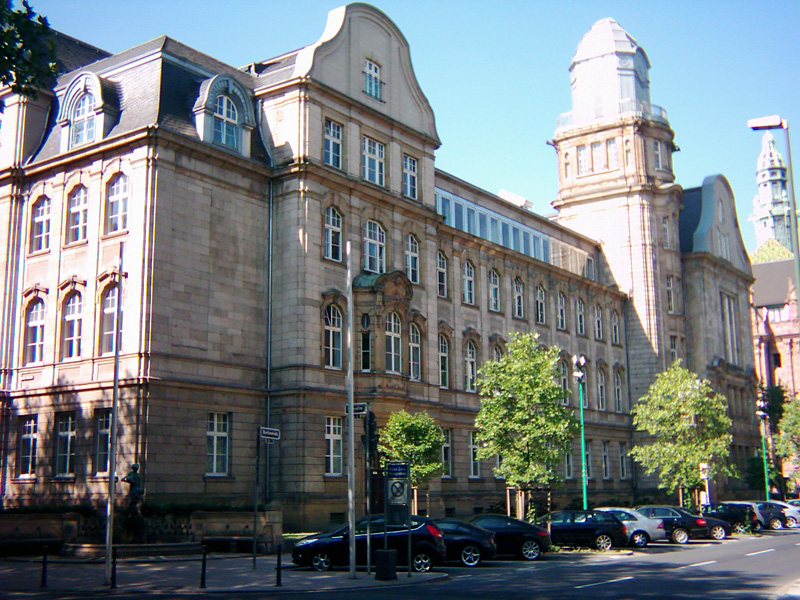
Görres-Gymnasium, Düsseldorf

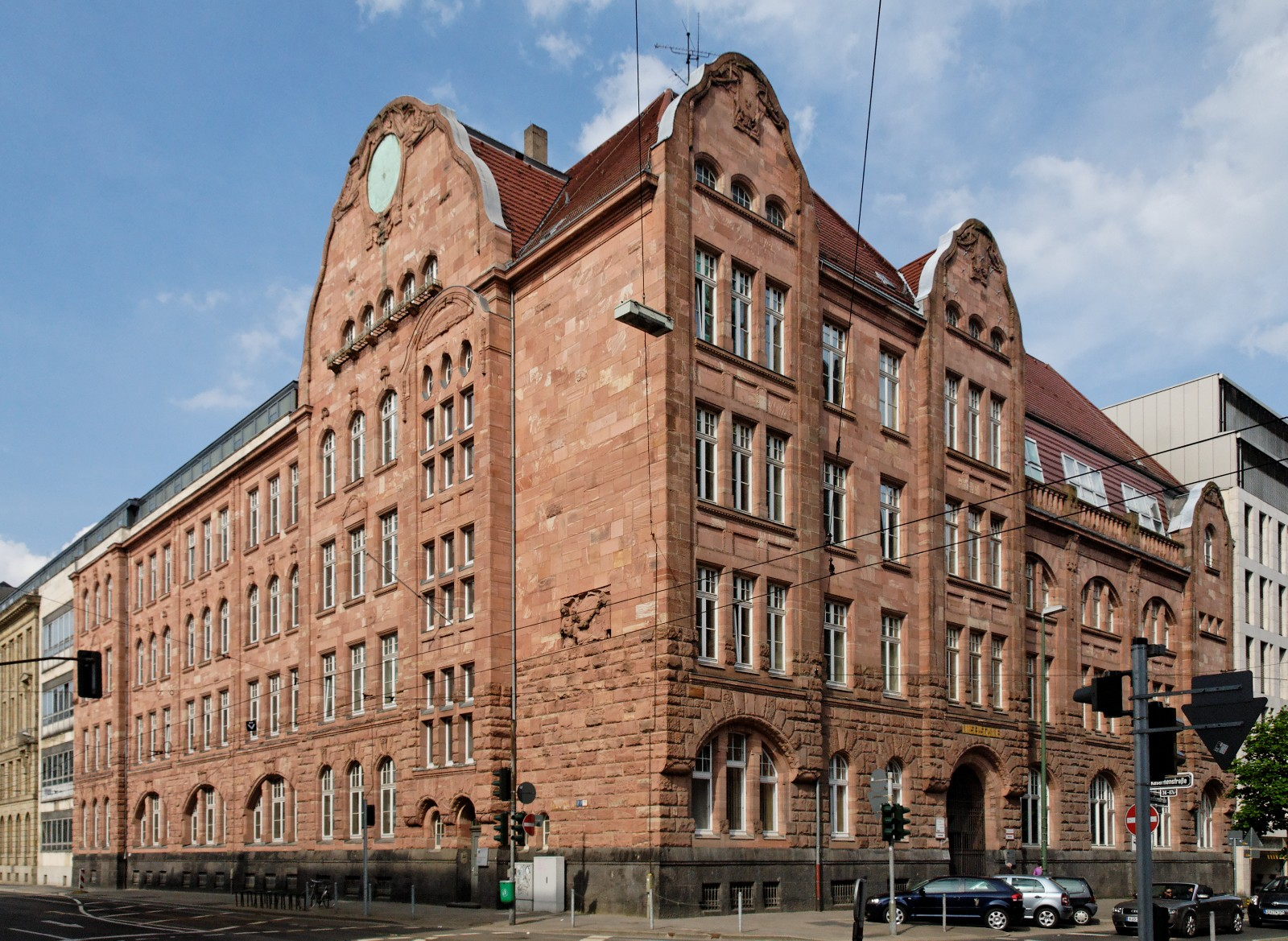
Luisen-Gymnasium, Düsseldorf

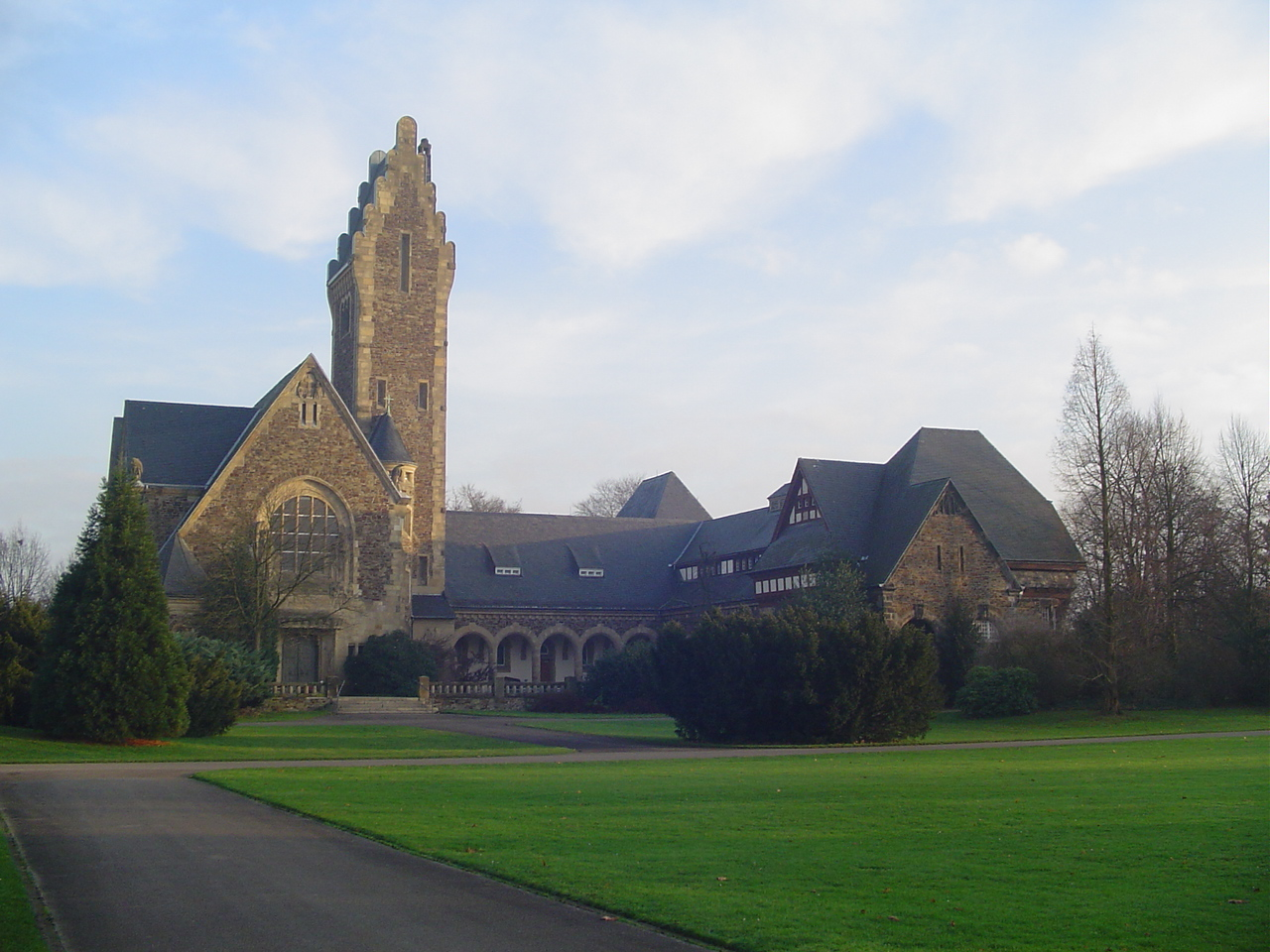
Friedhofskapelle Südfriedhof, Düsseldorf

=== Realizations ===
- 1893: German exhibition pavilion at the World's Columbian Exposition
- 1900: German exhibition pavilion at the Exposition Universelle (1900)
- 1900: Rheinuferpromenade in Düsseldorf-Altstadt
  - among others 1902: Düsselschlösschen, Weinlokal at Burgplatz
- 1904–1906: verschiedene Bauten des University Hospital of Düsseldorf
  - among others 1906: Holy Spirit Chapel (Church of the Düsseldorf University Hospital).
- 1904–1906: Görres-Gymnasium in Düsseldorf-Stadtmitte.
- 1904–1906: Leibniz-Gymnasium in Düsseldorf-Pempelfort
- 1904–1907: Luisen-Gymnasium in Düsseldorf-Stadtmitte.
- 1905: Friedhofskapelle auf dem Südfriedhof in Düsseldorf-Bilk.
- 1905–1906: Leo Statz Berufskolleg in Düsseldorf-Unterbilk.
- 1905–1907: Primary school at Badeanstalt Lindenstraße 128–130.
- 1906–1908: Stahlhof, Administration building of the Stahlwerksverband in Düsseldorf-Stadtmitte.
- 1907: Realschule Luisenstraße in Düsseldorf-Friedrichstadt.
- 1907–1911: Hauptfeuerwehrdepot (Feuerwache III) in Düsseldorf-Pempelfort
- 1908: Friedhofskapelle at the Soffeler Friedhof in Düsseldorf-Oberbilk.
- 1908–1910: Villa Wendelstadt in Bad Godesberg (Bauausführung durch Theo Westbrook)
- 1910–1912: Schule am Comeniusplatz (Comenius-Gymnasium, Comeniusstraße 1), Düsseldorf-Oberkassel.
- 1911–1912: Lessing-Gymnasium in Düsseldorf-Oberbilk.
- 1913–1914: Hauptschule Bernburger Straße in Düsseldorf-Eller.
- 1927–1928: eigenes Wohnhaus (als Ruhesitz), called 'Haus zur Linde', Bondorfer Straße in Bad Honnef

=== Publications ===
- Beschreibung des Schulgebäudes. Bagel, Düsseldorf 1904. (Digitized)
