= Eckstein =

Eckstein is a surname of German origin, meaning "cornerstone" (eck means 'corner', and stein means 'stone'). According to information gleaned from the U.S. Census, around 2,500 people in the United States have the surname Eckstein. Notable people with the surname include:

- Anna B. Eckstein (1868–1947), German peace activist
- Anne Eckstein (born 1955), Australian politician
- Arthur Eckstein, American historian
- Ashley Eckstein (born 1981), American actress and fashion designer
- Bernd Eckstein (born 1953) German ski jumper
- David Eckstein (born 1975), American baseball player
- Dieter Eckstein (born 1964), German footballer
- Emma Eckstein (1865–1924), early patient of Sigmund Freud
- Ernestine Eckstein (1941–1992), American Black, Feminist, and LGBT activist
- Ernst Eckstein (1845–1900), German humorist, novelist and poet
- Hans Eckstein (1908–1985), German water polo player
- Harry H. Eckstein (1924–1999), American political scientist
- Heinrich Eckstein (1907–1992), German politician
- Hermann Eckstein (1847–1893), German-born mining magnate and banker in South Africa
- John Eckstein (1736–1817), German artist
- Nathan Eckstein (1873–1945), German-born American businessman
- Otto Eckstein (1927–1984), German-born economist at Harvard University, and member of the U.S. President's Council of Economic Advisers
- Péter Eckstein-Kovács (born 1956), Romanian politician
- Rudolf Eckstein (1915–1993), German rower
- Shlomo Eckstein (1929–2020), Israeli economist and President of Bar-Ilan University
- Yael Eckstein, Jewish-American CEO
- Yechiel Eckstein (1951–2019), Israeli-American rabbi
- Warren Eckstein (born 1949), American animal rights activist

== See also ==
- Eckstein baronets, from a former baronetcy in the United Kingdom
- Eckstein Norton Institute (1890–1912) former black school in Bullitt County, Kentucky, U.S.
- Nathan Eckstein Middle School, public school in Seattle, Washington
- Eckstine
- Eksteen
- Eckstein (cigarette)
