= Franz Monjau =

German painter

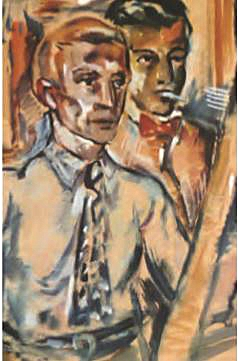
Self-portrait with Hans Eichler (1938)

Franz Monjau (30 January 1903, Cologne - 28 February 1945, KZ Buchenwald) was a German Expressionist painter and art teacher.

== Biography ==
His father, Max Monjau, was a manufacturer from Barmen. His mother Paula, née Meyer, was the daughter of a Jewish wine merchant in Mainz. Both parents were practicing Catholics. Around 1910, the family moved to Düsseldorf where his father became chief representative for the cigarette maker, A. M. Eckstein Söhne. After completing his primary education, he enrolled at the Kunstakademie Düsseldorf, where he studied from 1922 to 1926; originally with Willy Spatz, then as a Master Student of Heinrich Nauen.

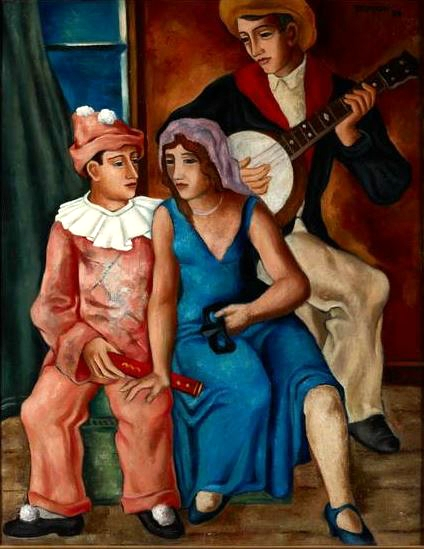
Carnival

As a free-lance painter, he became a member of Young Rhineland and later, the "Rheinischen Sezession". Both associations brought him into contact with members of the Communist Party of Germany (KPD). A major commission at GeSoLei was followed by two paintings for the Department of the History of Science, depicting Albertus Magnus and the witch-hunt opponent, Johann Weyer. His earnings from these projects enabled him to spend several months on a study trip to Paris.

In 1930, he married a gymnastics teacher, Marie Mertens (1903–1997), known as "Mieke", whom he had met the year before at a carnival. From 1931 to 1933, he was a trainee teacher in Duisburg and Düsseldorf. He also attended the University of Cologne, taking classes in educational science and psychology, and giving an occasional art lecture.

In 1933 he, Mieke, and several friends were arrested and briefly imprisoned, as part of a series of actions taken against "leaflet distributors", aimed at the KPD. Based on the provisions of the new Law for the Restoration of the Professional Civil Service, he was released from his teaching positions, prevented from taking the pedagogical examination and ultimately dismissed from the civil service entirely.

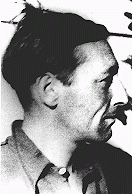
Police photo of Monjau

From 1936 to 1938, he was a drawing teacher at a private "Jüdischen Volksschule" (Jewish People's School) in Düsseldorf. He also made a few painting trips to the North Sea, Holland and Belgium. In 1941, Meike was sent to work at a hospital in Berlin and he taught illegally at several Jewish schools. He was also retrained and recertified as a draftsman and assigned to work at Alphons Custodis, a chimney construction company.

Not long after that, his mother, Paula, was transported to Theresienstadt and he became fearful for his own safety, as Half-Jews (Mischlings) were subject to a complicated and changing body of laws. Then, on June 12, 1943, his studio in Düsseldorf and most of his works were destroyed by a bombing raid. Finally, in 1944, he was denounced by a co-worker for not responding to a "Heil Hitler". He was arrested and taken to the local Gestapo prison. The following year, he was transported to Buchenwald, where he died in the medical experimentation unit at Ohrdruf.

In 1962, a memorial stone was erected in the Golzheimer Friedhof, honoring Monjau, Julo Levin and Peter Ludwigs. In 1998, following Mieke's death, the "Stiftung Monjau-Levin" was created and a large collection of children's drawings, obtained from her husband and Levin, were given an official place at the Stadtmuseum Düsseldorf. A stolperstein has been placed nearby at their former residence.
