= Tonhalle =

Tonhalle is a German word meaning "tone hall", a concert hall. It may refer to:

- Tonhalle Düsseldorf
- Tonhalle Orchester Zürich
- Tonhalle, Zürich, a concert venue
