= Julo Levin =

German painter (1901–1943)

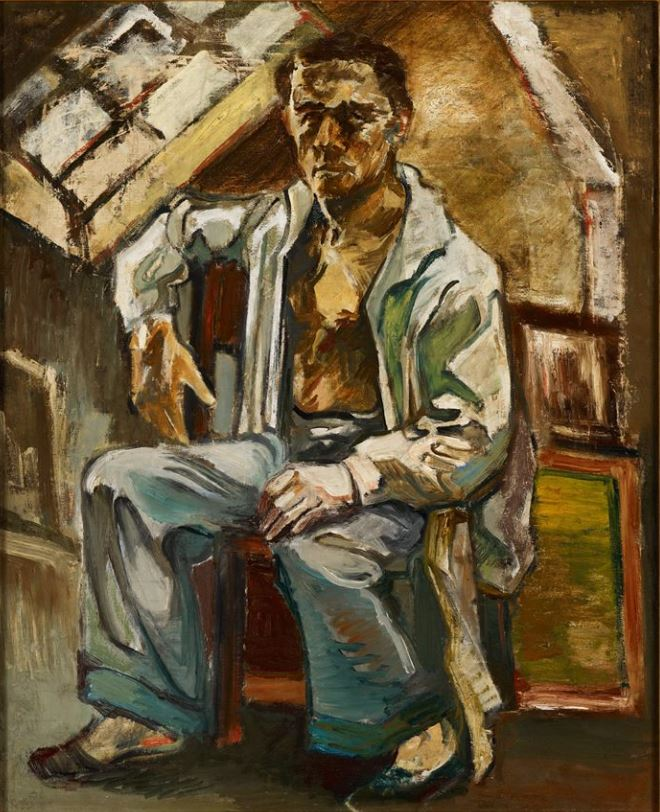
Self-portrait (1927)

Julo Levin, originally Julius (5 September 1901, Stettin - 1943, KZ Auschwitz) was a German Expressionist painter of Jewish ancestry. Most of his surviving works are watercolors and sketches, however his family have some of his paintings. He was murdered in the Holocaust.

== Biography ==
He showed an early aptitude for art and, from 1919, was already associated with artistic circles in the Rhineland. He studied at the Essen campus of the Folkwang University of the Arts with Karl Kriete and the Dutch artist, Johan Thorn Prikker; following him when he went to teach at the Royal Kunstgewerbeschule, Munich, in 1921. He transferred to the Kunstakademie Düsseldorf in 1923, where he was a Master Student of Heinrich Campendonk and Heinrich Nauen.

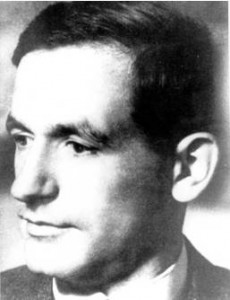
Levin in the 1930s

Upon completing his studies in 1926, he received his first major commission: a mural for the GeSoLei. His earnings enabled him to make a study trip to Paris. In 1931, he would return to France; spending a summer in Marseille which was especially productive. From 1925 t0 1932, he was a member of the "Rheinischen Sezession" and "Young Rhineland". He held numerous exhibitions in Düsseldorf, Berlin and Nurnberg.

From 1930 to 1939, he shared a studio in Düsseldorf-Stadtmitte with Karl Schwesig and other lesser-known artists. Soon after establishing himself there he, Schwesig, Peter Ludwigs, Hanns Kralik, Carl Lauterbach and the actor/director Wolfgang Langhoff created the Düsseldorf branch of the Association of Revolutionary Visual Artists (known as "Asso"), a Communist- oriented organization.

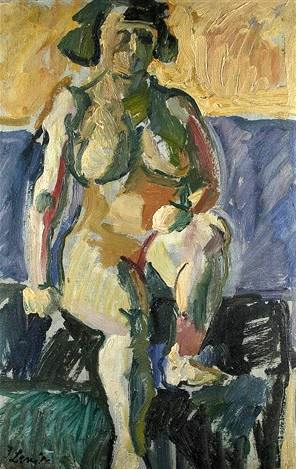
Sitting Female Nude

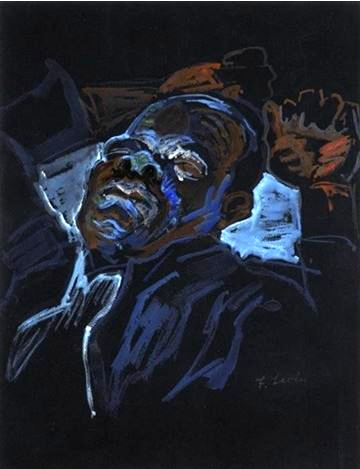
Ibrahim Kountel, Resting (Marseille)

As a result, in June 1933, he was arrested on political charges, related to his close ties with members of the KPD. Because of this, and his being Jewish, he was denied membership in the Reich Chamber of Culture, and was served with a "Malverbot" (painting forbidden) which put an end to his career. He was, however, able to work as a drawing teacher at Jewish schools in Düsseldorf and Berlin. He collected their drawings and passed them along to Mieke Monjau, wife of the painter Franz Monjau, who preserved them through the war. The collection is now in the Stadtmuseum Düsseldorf.

After 1939, he lived in Berlin, where he continued to teach drawing until 1942, when the Jewish community became a source of conscripted labor for the SS. While working at the railroad freight station, he was charged with cleaning the box cars returning from the concentration camps. In May, 1943, Levin himself was taken to Auschwitz, where he was murdered later that year.

In 1962, on the south side of the Golzheimer Friedhof, a memorial stone was erected in honor of Levin, Franz Monjau and Peter Ludwigs. Since 2003, the "Julo-Levin-Ufer" in Düsseldorf-Hafen has been dedicated to the artist. A memorial stele, created under the auspices of the Stiftung Monjau-Levin, was unveiled in 2014. The building includes a hall for events and pedagogical projects. In 2015 the artist, Gunter Demnig, placed a stolperstein at Levin's birthplace in Stettin (Szczecin). In 2017, another stolperstein was placed in front of his residence in Berlin.
