= Peter Ludwigs =

German sculptor and painter

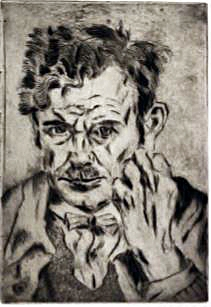
Self-portrait (1927)

Peter Ludwigs (16 February 1888, Aachen – 3 July 1943, Düsseldorf) was a German sculptor and Expressionist painter. He is primarily known for his later, Anti-fascist paintings.

== Biography ==
He was born into an old family of manufacturers. Initially, he studied sculpture at the Werkkunstschule Aachen (a Kunstgewerbeschule) and the Académie Royale des Beaux-Arts in Brussels. In 1911, he moved to Düsseldorf and got married. From 1915 to 1918, he was a voluntary participant in World War I, an experience that left him opposed to militarism. A year after his return, he joined the left-wing Aktivistenbund 1919 ("Neuen Gesellschaft für künstlerische Kultur"). He was also one of the co-founders of "Young Rhineland". During this time, he turned from sculpture to painting; with an emphasis on social commentary.

In 1922, he became a member of the Communist Party of Germany (KPD). Two years later, he was one of the co-founders of the satirical journal Die Peitsche (the whip). Together with Karl Schwesig and Gert Heinrich Wollheim, he published cartoons and graphics in opposition to militarism and supporting "class justice". He and several other left-leaning German painters also participated in the "First General Art Exhibition" in Moscow (1924). After "Young Rhineland" broke up, he became a board member of its successor, the "Rhenish Secession". In 1929 he, Schwesig, Mathias Barz, Hanns Kralik, Julo Levin, Carl Lauterbach and the actor/director Wolfgang Langhoff created the Association of Revolutionary Visual Artists (known in German as ASSO).

After Hitler's rise to power in 1933, his paintings were classified as "degenerate art" and banned from being shown in public. Cut off from his livelihood and increasingly impoverished, he joined the Resistance and distributed illegal Communist pamphlets. He also became part of a group of Anti-fascist artists in Düsseldorf, who offered each other mutual financial support and protection, centered around the painter, Otto Pankok. His activities put him under constant surveillance by the Gestapo and he was arrested in 1937, on suspicion of high treason, but released in 1938.

In February, 1943, he was arrested again and sent to Düsseldorf Prison, where he was assigned to a labor gang doing heavy road-clearing work. A combination of exhaustion and insulin deprivation (he was diabetic) caused his death in July.

In 1962, a monument was erected in the Golzheimer Friedhof, commemorating Ludwigs, Julo Levin and Franz Monjau. A stolperstein was later placed at his residence in Düsseldorf. Thirty of his paintings are on display at the Museum Kunstpalast.

== Selected paintings ==
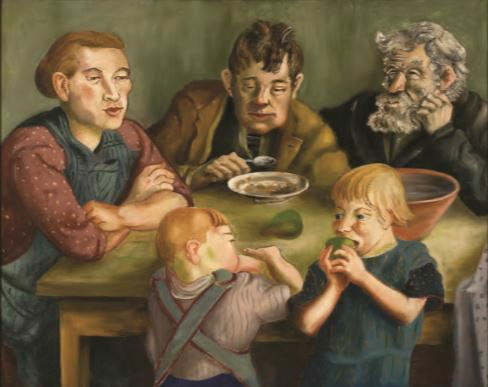
Working Family at the Table (Mealtime)

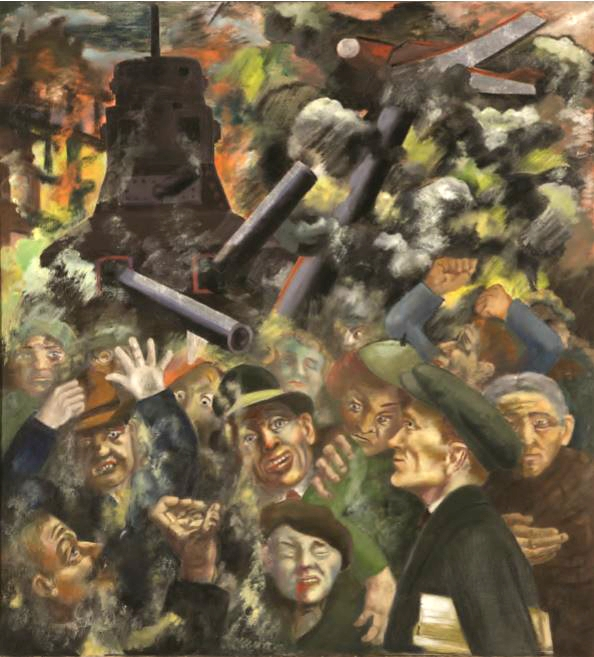
The War

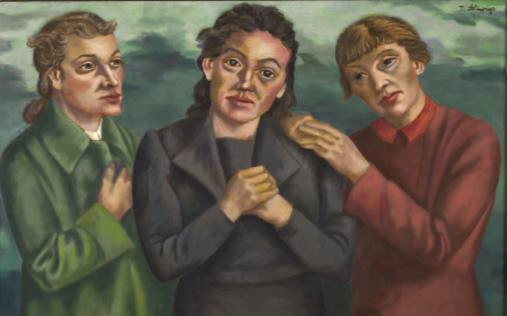
War Widows

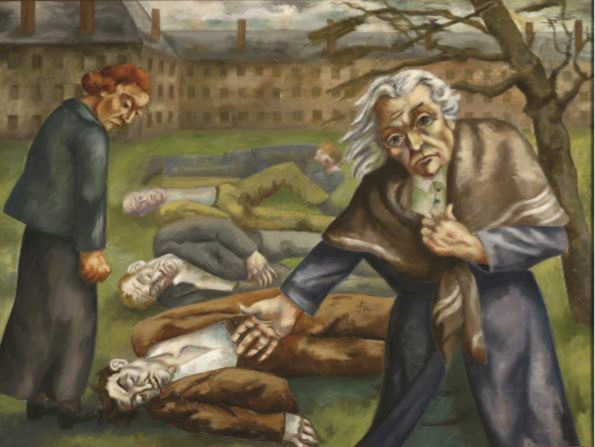
Mother B. (at Düsseldorf Prison)
