= Eksteen =

Eksteen is a surname of South African origin, being a variant of Eckstein, a German occupational surname meaning "cornerstone" and referring to a stonemason. Notable people with the surname include:

- Cindy Eksteen (born 1977), South African former cricketer
- Clive Eksteen (born 1966), South African cricketer
- Fred Eksteen (born 1991), South African rugby union player
- Leighton Eksteen (born 1994), South African rugby union player
- Ryno Eksteen (born 1994), South African rugby union player

== See also ==
- Eckstine
