= Schwabacher Brothers =

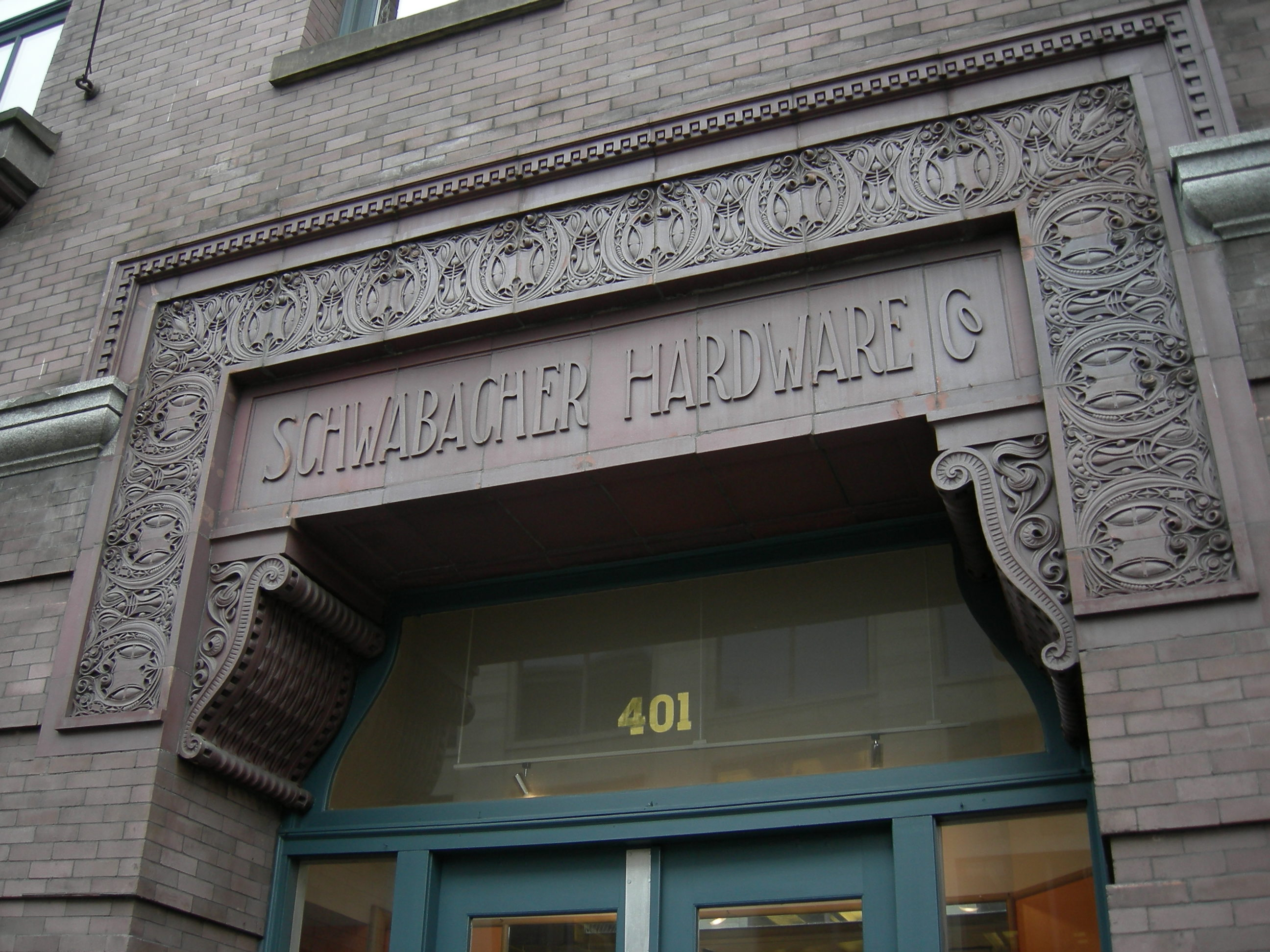
Schwabacher Hardware Co. sign at 401 First Avenue S., Seattle, Washington

The Schwabacher Brothers—Louis Schwabacher (1837 – June 3, 1900), Abraham (Abe) Schwabacher (c. 1838 – September 7, 1909), and Sigmund (Sig) Schwabacher (May 14, 1841 – March 20, 1917)—were pioneering Bavarian-born Jewish merchants, important in the economic development of the Washington Territory and later Washington state. They owned several businesses bearing their family name, first in San Francisco, then in Walla Walla, Washington, and later in Seattle. Notable among these businesses were Schwabacher Bros. of San Francisco (wholesale grocery); Schwabacher Bros. & Company (later Pacific Marine Schwabacher), the Schwabacher Realty Company, the Gatzert-Schwabacher Land Company, and the Schwabacher Hardware Company, all ultimately based in Seattle; and the Stockton Milling Company.

== To California ==
The three Schwabacher brothers, natives of Zirndorf, Bavaria, came to the United States in the mid-19th century. The first to cross over was Louis Schwabacher, who came over with the help of his mother’s brother, Isaac Bloch of San Francisco. Louis engaged in business several places in the Southern United States and settled for a time in Mississippi. In 1858 he relocated to San Francisco. Around that time, his brothers joined him.

When the main focus of the brothers' business shifted to the Pacific Northwest, Abraham Schwabacher stayed behind at the brothers' San Francisco headquarters. He married his first cousin, Sara Lehrberger Schwabacher.

One Schwabacher enterprise in California was the Stockton Milling Company (Stockton, California), of which Sigmund Schwabacher was president.

== Walla Walla ==
After ventures in San Francisco and in The Dalles, Oregon (where Sigmund worked for a relative with the surname Black, probably originally Bloch), the brothers set up a business in Walla Walla, Washington, in 1860. At that time, Walla Walla was a base for the Orofino Creek gold rush in Idaho, and was accessible only about half the year, when the untamed Columbia River was calm enough for travel; a decade later it was still a chaotic frontier town.

For roughly two decades, Sigmund Schwabacher would remain the firm's resident partner in Walla Walla. He was director of the First National Bank of Walla Walla, (independent until it was merged into Seattle First National Bank in 1947), and helped raise funds for the Seattle and Walla Walla Railroad. (Despite its ambitious name, the railroad never made it out of King County, where Seattle is located.) The Schwabacher company also operated two grist mills in Walla Walla. In 1872, Sigmund Schwabacher also married his cousin, Rosa Schwabacher; about 10 years later, she convinced him that it was time to return to San Francisco.

Louis Schwabacher worked for a while in Walla Walla; after marrying Bella Blum in 1877, he moved back to San Francisco, managing the eastern Washington stores remotely.

The Shwabachers' 1876 building in Walla Walla was described in a 19th-century account as:

…the finest building north of San Francisco, its front resplendent with massive iron columns and arches; its seven entrances each with double doors, the outer ones being iron, the inner cedar…. The interior was 16 feet high, painted white. Its six iron pillars were painted and gilded. In the northwest corner, there was a glass space of 12x16 elevated with a fireplace where Mr. Sigmund Schwabacher could observe and direct the activities.

In 1909, H.A. Gardner, J.M. Fitzgerald, and others bought the store, which survived until 1980 as Gardner's Department Store.

== Boise ==
The Schwabachers also had a branch store in Boise, Idaho.

== Seattle ==
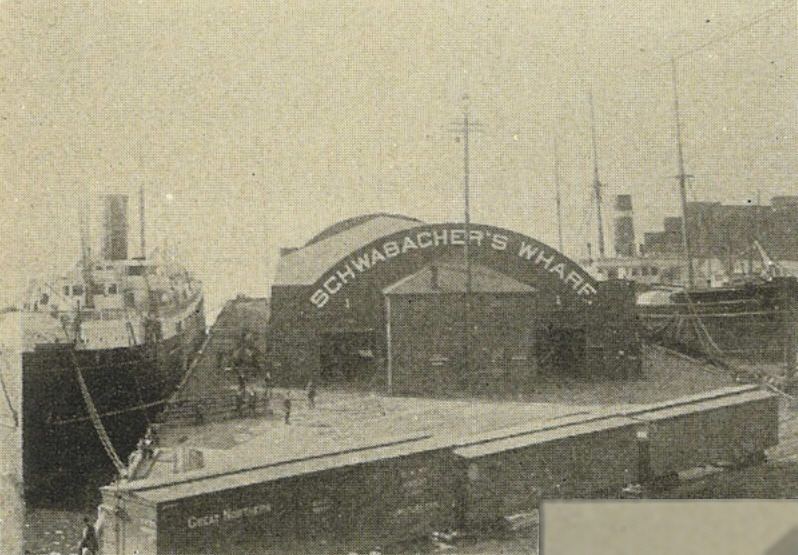
Schwabacher's Wharf, Seattle, circa 1900

The three Schwabacher brothers' only sister, Bobette (Babette) Schwabacher (January 3, 1836 – January 7, 1908), married the brothers' business associate Bailey Gatzert in 1861. The couple headed in 1869 for Seattle—then a town of barely 1,000 people—where Gatzert established a branch of Schwabacher Bros. & Company. Gatzert would go on to become Seattle's first (and, as of 2009, only) Jewish mayor. Schwabacher Bros. & Company became Seattle's first wholesaler, with a business opened October 11, 1869. Schwabachers' 1872 Seattle office at Front Street (now First Avenue South) and Yesler Way was the city's first brick building. Under Gatzert's direction, the company also constructed a warehouse, a grist mill, and Schwabacher's Wharf.

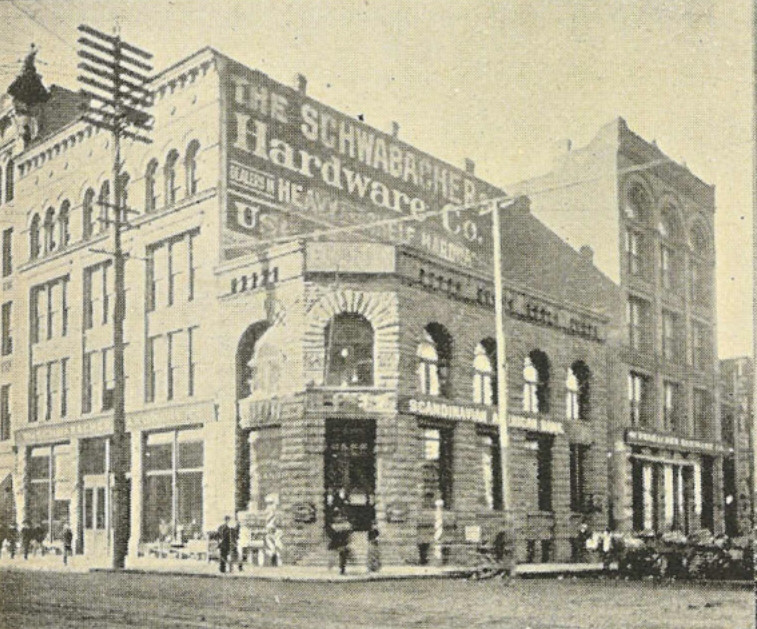
Schwabacher's Hardware Co. at First and Yesler, Seattle, circa 1900

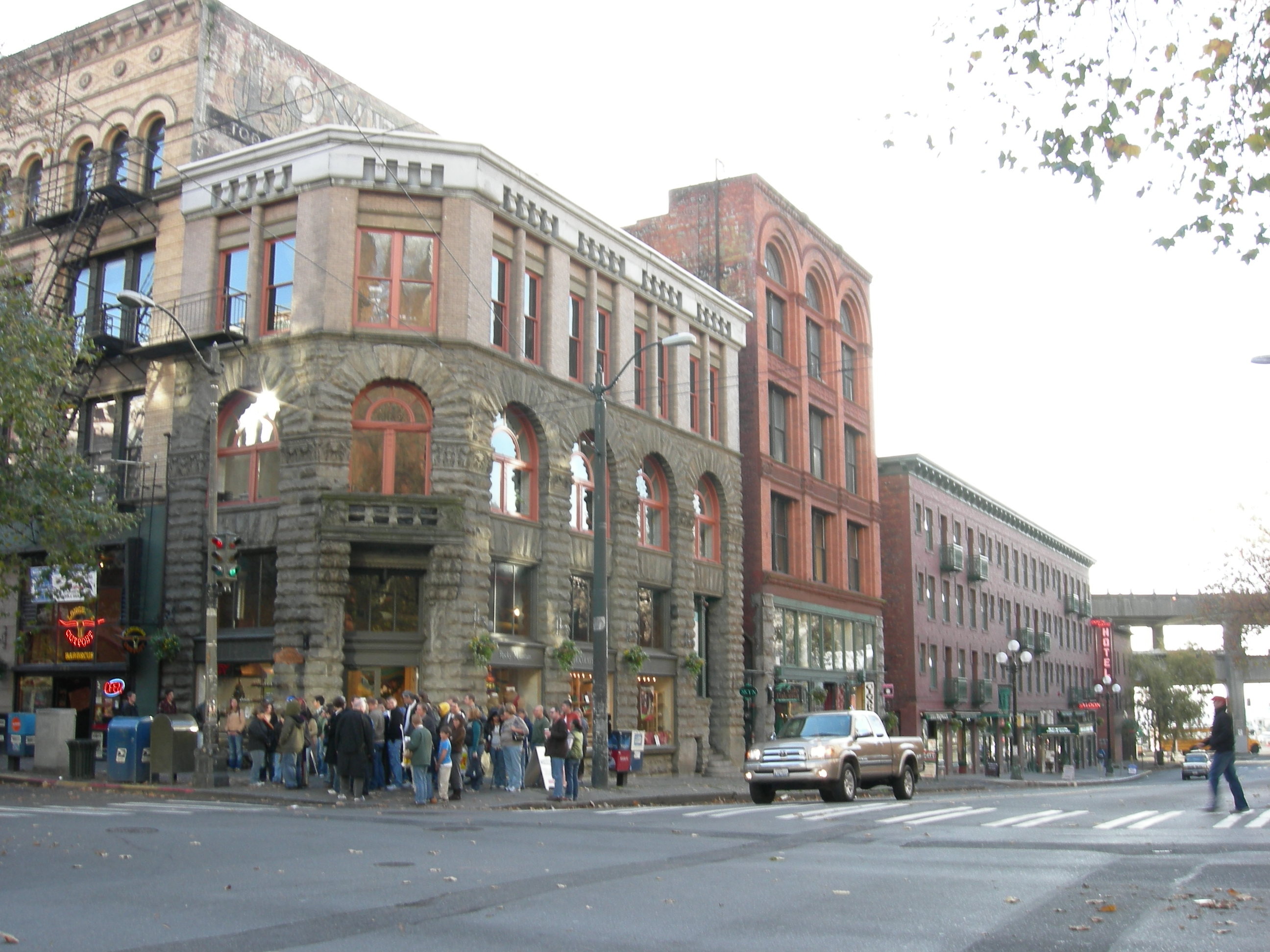
A similar view in 2007.

A September 25, 1871 advertisement in the Intelligencer (predecessor of the Seattle Post-Intelligencer) boasted that the store "sold everything from a needle to an anchor." The store established in-house brands "Colonial" and "Old Faithful." Drawing on the company's Walla Walla experience, the store outfitted miners for the 1879–1880 Ruby Creek/Skagit River gold rush slightly north of Seattle.

Schwabacher's Wharf, site of the city's first customs house and first bonded warehouse had the good fortune to be the only wharf on Seattle's Central Waterfront to survive the Great Seattle Fire of 1889. The arrival of the Portland at Schwabacher's Wharf in July 1897, with its "ton of gold", is usually counted as the start of the Yukon Gold Rush, from which the Schwabachers profited greatly as outfitters. Schwabacher's Wharf was also the terminus for Seattle's first shipping trade route to the Orient, connecting to the Great Northern Railway.

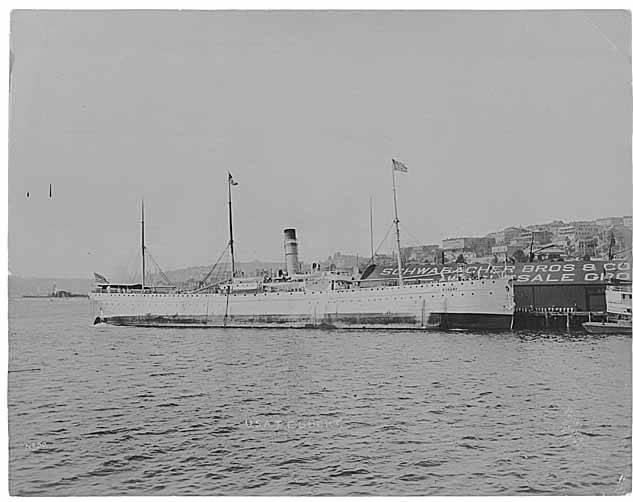
U.S.A.T. Egbert docked at Schwabacher's Wharf in 1900 while preparing to transport troops to China to deal with the Boxer Rebellion

While Schwabacher's Wharf survived the Great Seattle Fire, their retail store did not. Within 16 days, they had erected temporary one-story brick building at Front Street (now First Avenue) and Madison Street. In 1893, another fire burned out their hardware department, prompting new construction with the hardware department as the separate Schwabacher Hardware Company, headed by Sigmund Schwabacher, who for the rest of his life traveled frequently between San Francisco and Seattle. Upon Sigmund's death in 1900, he was succeeded at Schwabacher Hardware by his son Leopold (Leo) S. Schwabacher (December 26, 1871 – April 6, 1930). Three years later, Leo married Edna Blum of San Francisco; they settled in Seattle. Another fire hit the Schwabacher Hardware Company on February 11, 1905, leading to the construction of a new and even larger store at First Avenue South and South Jackson Street.

Bailey Gatzert died in 1893. He was succeeded at Schwabacher Bros. & Company in Seattle by James S. Goldsmith, and then in 1901 by Nathan Eckstein, who in 1902 married Abraham's daughter Mina Schwabacher (October 21, 1877 – October 21, 1945).

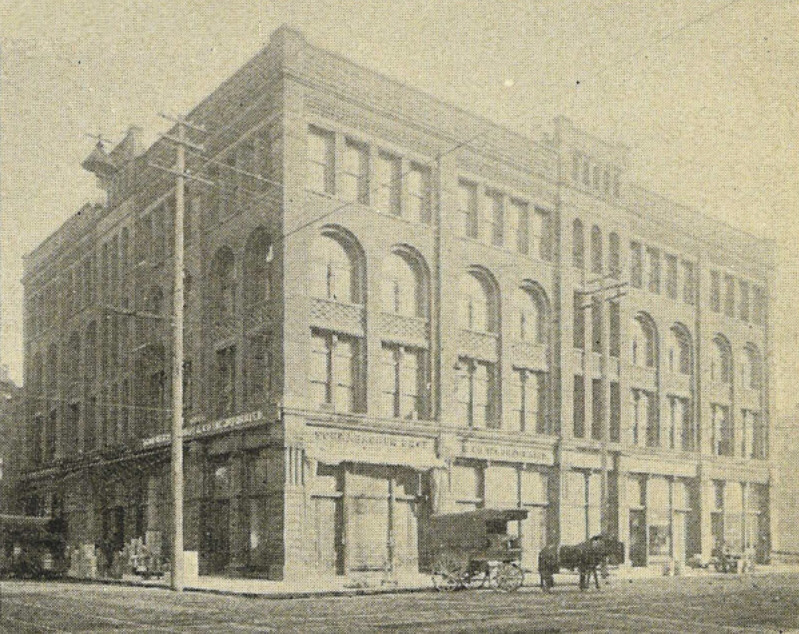
Schwabacher's building at Occidental and Main, Seattle, circa 1900.

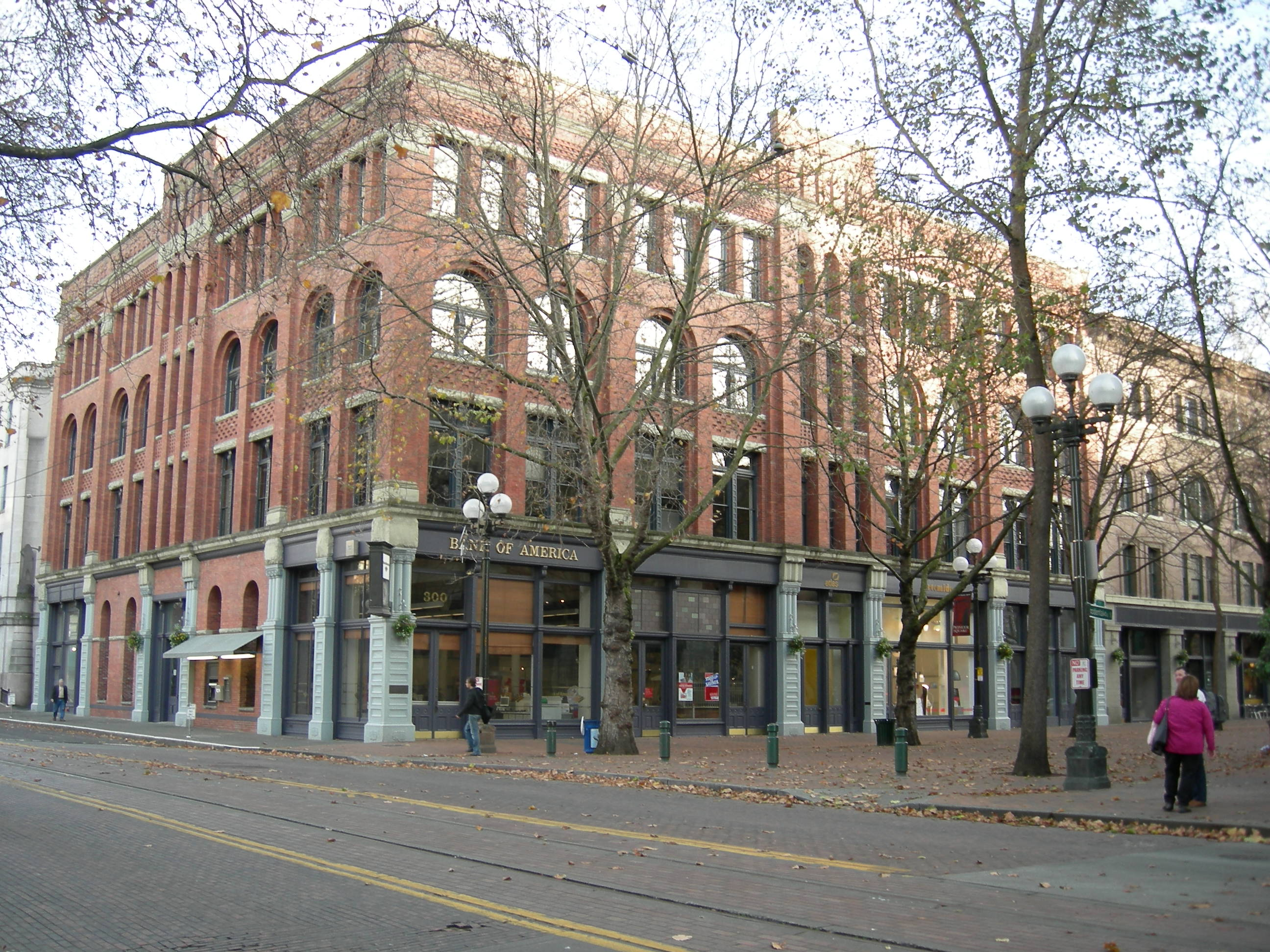
A similar view in 2007.

In 1931, Leo Schwabacher died, and was succeeded at the Schwabacher Hardware Company by his son—the Yale-educated Morton L. Schwabacher (December 12, 1902 – March 26, 1977)—after a two-year tutelage by Eckstein. Just before his father Leo's death, Morton married his San Franciscan second cousin once removed, Emilie Bloch, who joined him in Seattle; their sole daughter Eleanor married Philip Boren. However, the Schwabacher business dynasty ended with Morton Schwabacher's death in 1977.

The Seattle Schwabachers, including Schwabachers-by-marriage Gatzert and Eckstein, were heavily involved in Seattle society, non-profit work, and in the establishment of Reform Judaism in Seattle. Along with Schwabacher protégé Jacob Furth, Bailey Gatzert played a key role in assuring the city a water supply in the 1880s. Gatzert was also a Seattle City Council member and mayor, as well as longtime Seattle Chamber of Commerce head. Gatzert's wife, the former Babette Schwabacher, co-founded Seattle's first charity, the Ladies Relief Society (now Seattle Children's Home), and was active in the early years of the city's Ladies Hebrew Benevolent Society. Various Schwabacher associates played major roles in Seattle's first Jewish congregation, Ohaveth Sholum. Morton Schwabacher was a longtime board member of Temple De Hirsch, vice president of the ecumenical Camp Brotherhood, and president of the Council on Aging. Morton Schwabacher's wife Emily was a board member of Children's Orthopedic Hospital, now Seattle Children's. Nathan Eckstein's extensive volunteer activities included six years on the Seattle school board and active roles in the Seattle Community Fund (later Seattle United Way), a Washington State tax investigation committee (1921–1922), and the 1925 Seattle City Charter Commission; he was also active in charitable organizations and was a patron of the Seattle Symphony Orchestra. In addition, Jacob Furth, who had come to Seattle under the influence of the Gatzerts, and whose business interests were intertwined with theirs, played a major role on many fronts in the city's development.

In 1919 the Seattle Post-Intelligencer wrote of the firm on its 50th anniversary:

The history of Schwabacher is interwoven with the history of Seattle, not alone in that the firm and the city have progressed in the respective enterprises of business and community development, but in the more intimate relations between the men of the Schwabacher concern and their fellow citizens. True public spirit has never been more constantly exemplified than by all of these, from Mr. Gatzert, the pioneer, to Nathan Eckstein, the present able head of the firm, always attended by generous contribution of time, service and money to every civic need. Seattle and the house of Schwabacher are fond and justly proud of each other—not a doubt of that.

Schwabacher Bros. & Company was eventually renamed Pacific Coast Wholesale Grocery and later as Pacific Marine Schwabacher, Inc., which operated in eight western states. According to the Seattle Times in 1976, it was at that time the Pacific Northwest's largest wholesaler of hard goods. Pacific Marine Schwabacher sold out to Jensen-Byrd Co. of Spokane, Washington in 1981.

=== Gatzert-Schwabacher Land Company ===
The Gatzert-Schwabacher Land Company primarily owned land in Seattle, but also had investments in Anacortes, Washington, and in Skagit, as well as Pierce and Jefferson Counties.

== Schwabacher genealogy ==
With numerous cousin marriages and multiple recurring forenames, the Schwabacher family genealogy can be confusing. In particularly, there were numerous intermarriages with the Bloch family. The parents of Babette, Louis, Abraham, Sigmund Schwabacher were Loeb Schwabacher (c. 1800 – May 23, 1846) and Mina née Bloch (October 10, 1805 – May 11, 1843). They lived and died in Bavaria. Mina's parents were Feischel Bloch and Sarah née Floss. Mina's sisters Henrietta (Jetta) and Sophie successively married Samuel Lehrberger; Sophie and Samuel Lehrberger's daughter Sarah married Abraham Schwabacher. Mina's brother Isaac Bloch had a granddaughter Emilie, who married Morton Schwabacher.

Babette Schwabacher and Bailey Gatzert had no children. Louis Schwabacher and Belle (or Bella), née Blum, had two daughters, Mina Louise and Jacie.

Abraham Schwabacher and Sarah née Lehrberger had five children. Their children were Louis A., Jennie, Frederick, Sophie, and Mina Alice (who married Nathan Eckstein). The Ecksteins had two daughters: Johanna—a noted Seattle philanthropist and patron of the arts, who never married—and Babette, who married twice and had four children.

Sigmund Schwabacher and his wife Rosa Schwabacher (an Albany, New York-born relative, although the exact relationship is unclear) had seven children; of these, only their eldest son Leo (and, in turn, his son Morton) figures in the business dynasty in the Pacific Northwest. Sigmund and Rosa Schwabacher's other children were Max, Mina, Lester (who died in infancy), Stella, Franklin (Frank), and Helen Rita. Stella, Frank, and Helen left further descendants.

== Gallery ==
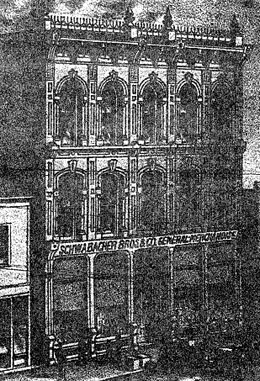
Schwabachers' 1872 Seattle store, circa 1884. This store burned in the Great Seattle Fire.

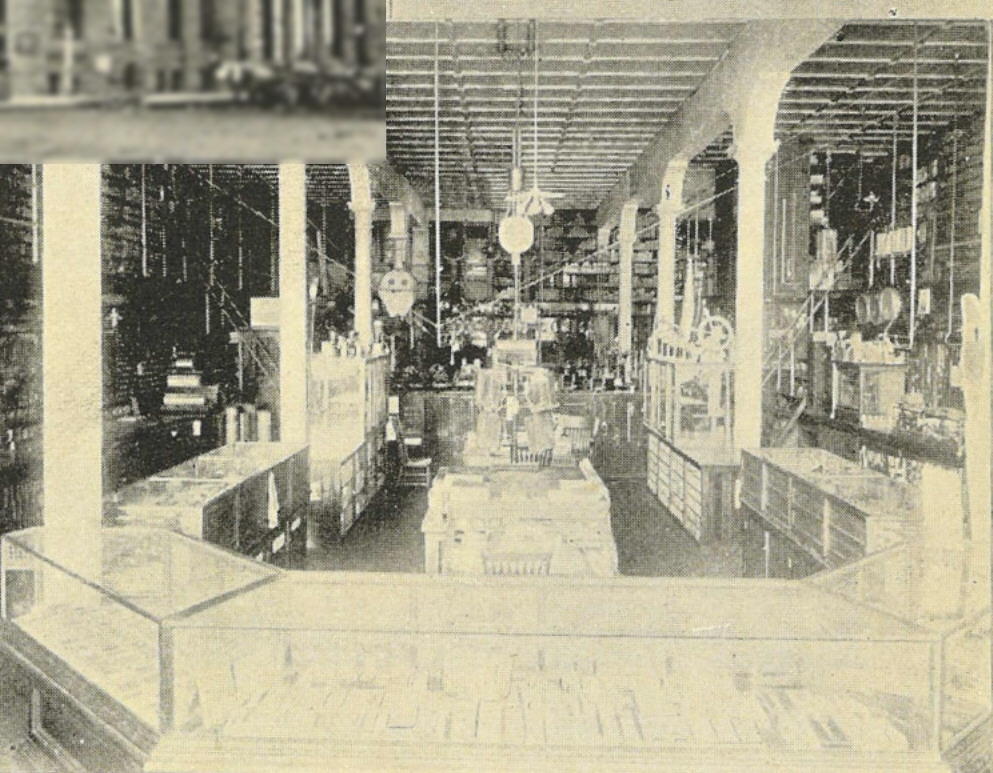
Interior, Schwabacher Hardware, 1900.

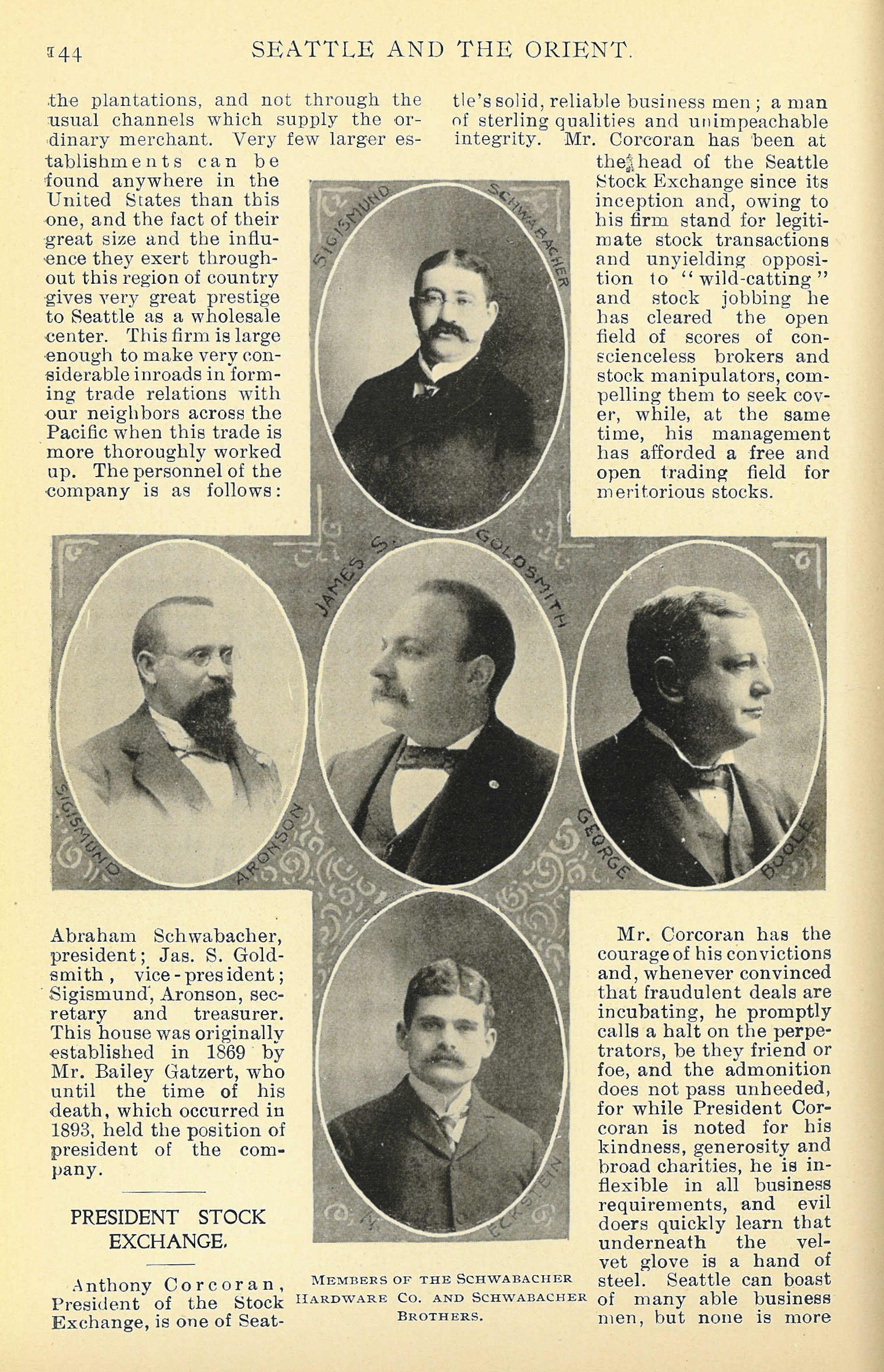
Key Seattle Schwabacher personnel, 1900.
Top: Sig Schwabacher.
Middle (left-to-right): Sigismund Aronson, James S. Goldsmith, George Boole.
Bottom: Nathan Eckstein.

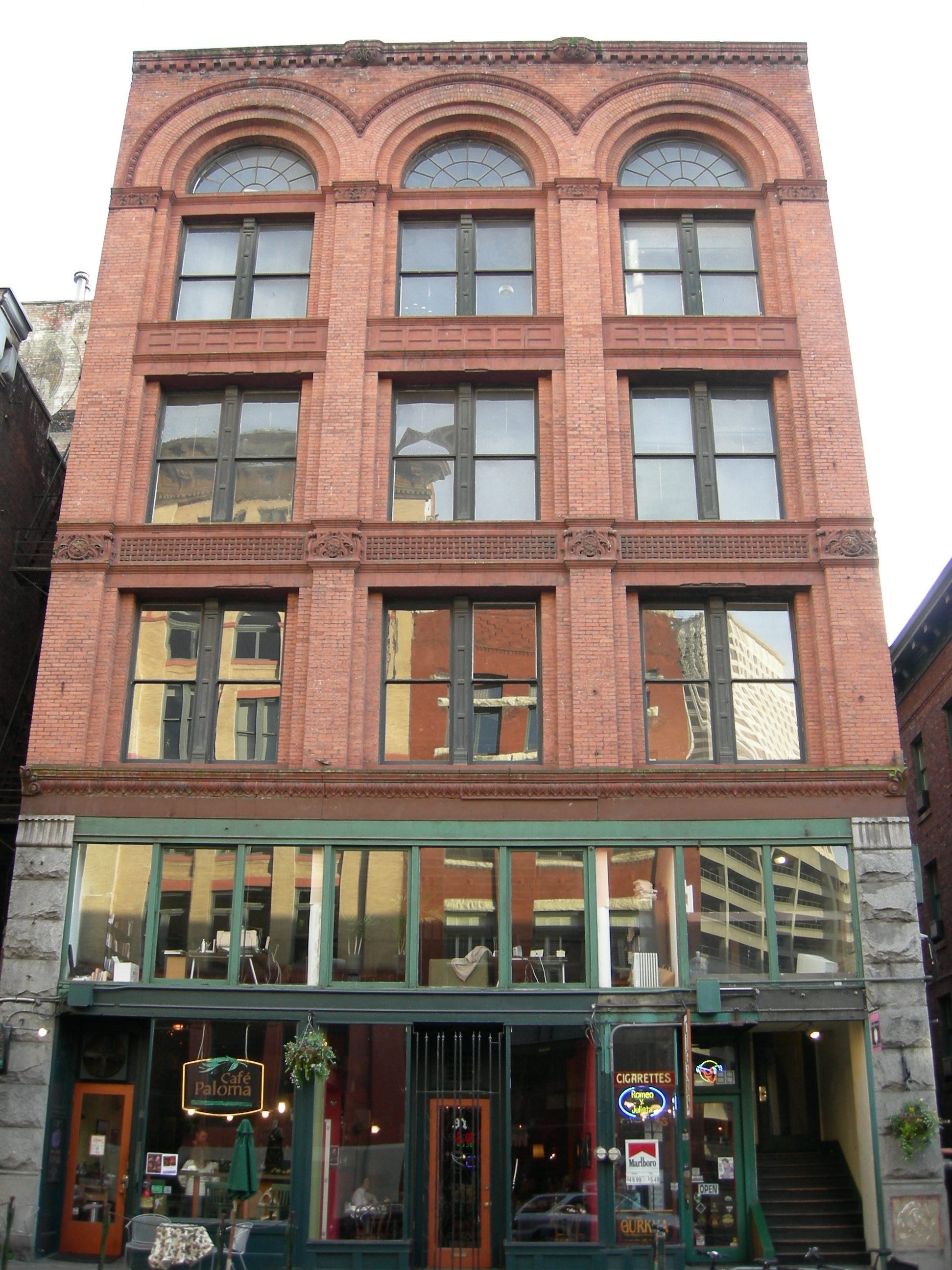
The Yesler Way side of the store at First and Yesler, 2007.
