= Marie von Malachowski-Nauen =

German painter (1880-1943)

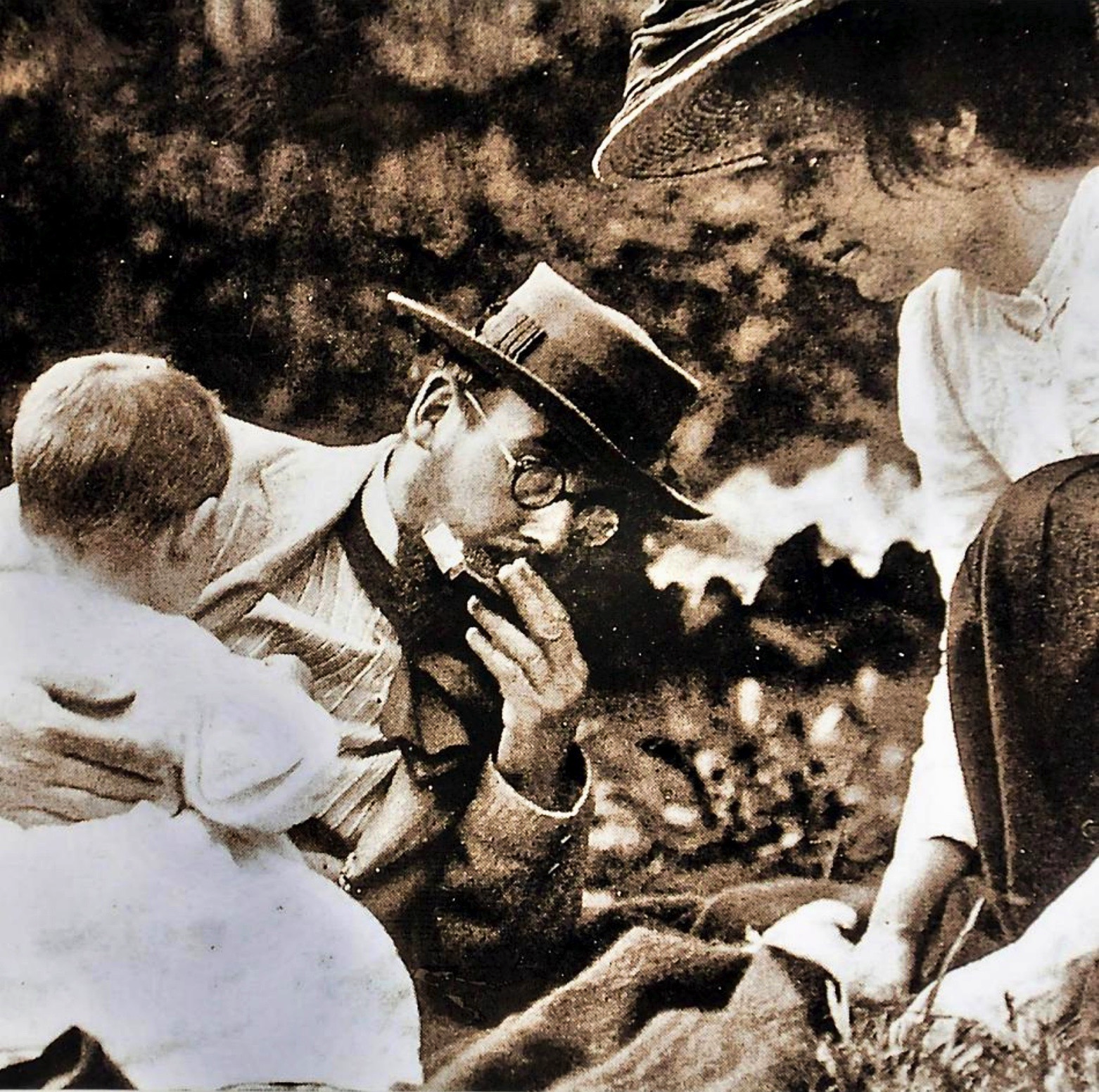
- Heinrich Nauen playing a harmonica, with his wife Marie von Malachowski-Nauen and her daughter Nora
- Born: Marie von Malachowski; 1880; Hanover, Germany
- Died: 1943 (aged 62–63); Kalkar, Germany
- Known for: Painting

Marie von Malachowski-Nauen (1880 Hanover, Germany-1943 Kalkar, Germany) was a German painter. In 1905 she married the German artist Heinrich Nauen (1880–1940). She is considered an Expressionist painter.

Her work is in the Abteiberg Museum.

== Gallery ==
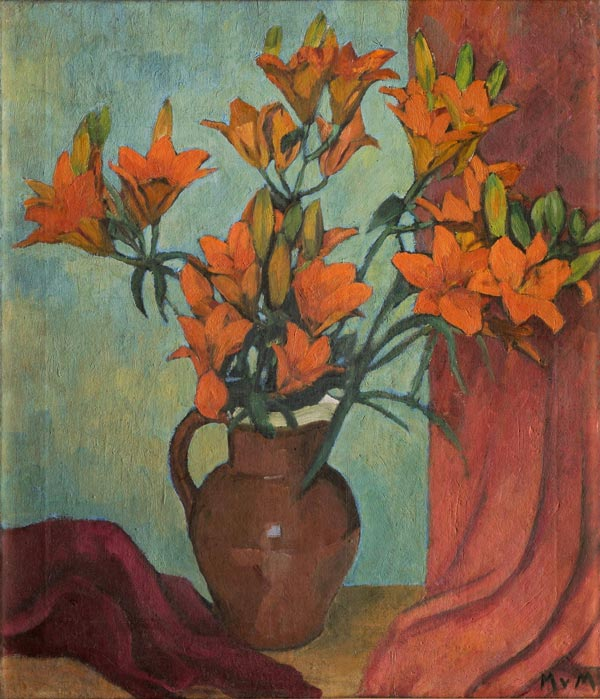
Lilien

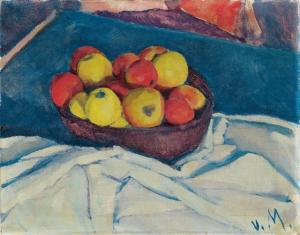
Schale mit Äpfeln

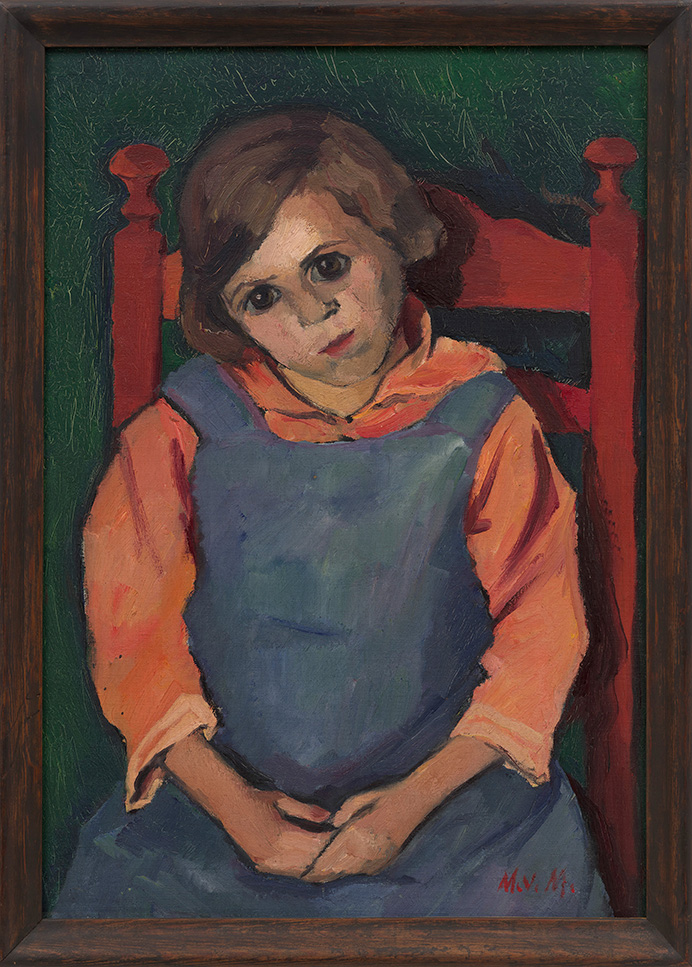
Kinderbildnis
