= Eckstine =

Eckstine is a surname. Notable people with the surname include:

- Billy Eckstine (1914–1993), ballad singer and bandleader during the Swing era
- Guy Eckstine (born 1956), American music industry executive
- Ronnie Eckstine (born 1946), American actor and music manager, stepson of Billy

== See also ==
- Eckstein
- Eksteen
