= Nathan Eckstein Middle School =

Coordinates: 47°40′55″N 122°17′39″W

Eckstein Middle School
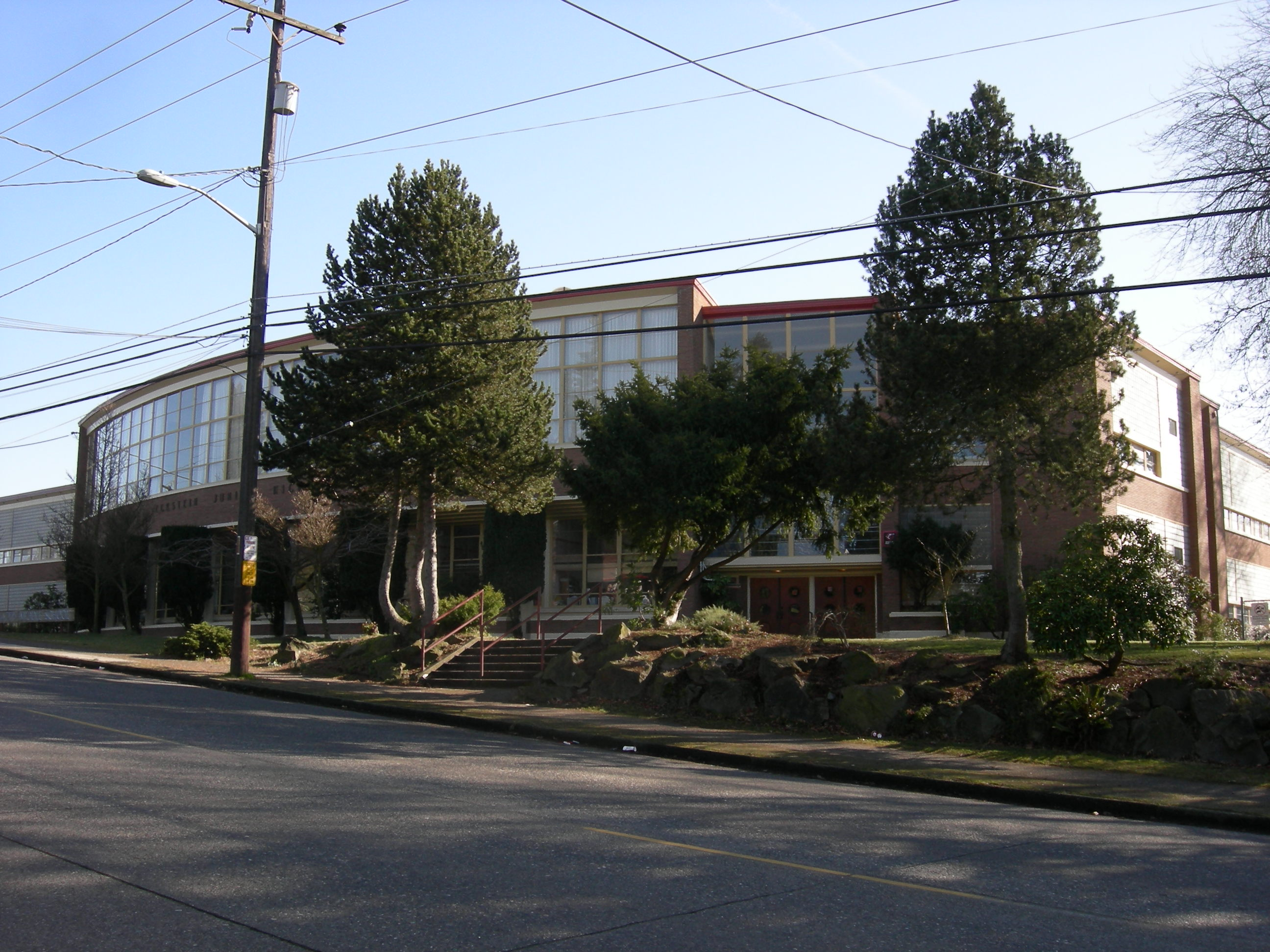
- Bryant and Wedgwood, Seattle, Washington; United States

Information
- Type: Public
- Established: 1950
- School district: Seattle Public Schools
- Principal: Kristin Rose
- Faculty: ~70
- Grades: 6-8
- Enrollment: 1,056 (2023-24)
- Colors: Blue and white
- Athletics: Basketball, Soccer, Volleyball, Track, Ultimate
- Mascot: Eagles
- Rival: Jane Addams Middle School
- Feeder to: Roosevelt High School
- Website: http://ecksteinms.seattleschools.org

Eckstein Middle School (EMS, formally Nathan Eckstein Middle School) is a middle school located in Seattle, Washington, and is part of Seattle Public Schools.

== History ==
Eckstein Middle School is part of the Seattle Public School District and located on the border of the Wedgwood and Ravenna neighborhoods. It was named after Nathan Eckstein, a Seattle businessman, Seattle School Board member, and onetime director of Seattle Public Schools.

The school originally opened as a junior high school in 1950 to 790 students. In 1971, it was changed into a middle school, teaching students in grades six through eight. For many years leading up to 2014, when school boundaries changed, Eckstein's student enrollment was about 1300 students. It now serves about 1056 students, over 90 of whom are enrolled in the special education program, and employs 44 certificated teachers.

In 1998, Richard Riley, the U.S. Secretary of Education, chose to deliver the State of Education address in the school's auditorium.

The building is a designated city landmark.

An urban legend exists among the school that a pool exists on the roof, inspired by a sign in the school where "Roof" is partially scratched off to read "Pool".

== Music Program ==
=== Orchestra ===
Eckstein has three orchestras. They are the Introductory, Intermediate, and Concert Orchestras. It is now taught by Angelina Kong after the retirement of Brad Smith. The Eckstein orchestra program has won a notable number of awards.

=== Band Program ===
Eckstein has five Bands, not including the Jazz Bands. They are all taught by Cuauhtemoc Escobedo, except for the Beginning Band, which is taught by Angelina Kong. Beginning Band is for students beginning in the 6th grade instead of Elementary. Junior Band is for 6th graders, who played band in Elementary school and are at an average skill level for their age. Intermediate Band consists of mostly 7th graders, and usually about 0 to 8 6th graders who are above average skill level. Wind Ensemble is mainly for 8th graders, but less commonly obtains 7th graders and more recently, 6th graders.

=== Jazz Band ===
Eckstein has three jazz bands, two of which meet as a class during the school day, and one of which meets on Tuesdays and Thursdays after school. All three Jazz bands are taught by Moc Escobedo. The Senior Jazz Band attends Music in the parks at Silverwood amusement park in Couer D’lane, Idaho.Their main competition is Hamilton International Middle School Jazz Band. Eckstein lost to them at Clark College, Bellevue High School, and Bellevue Community College, and has never won against them.

== Eckstein Logos ==
=== 2013 Design ===
In March 2013, an Eckstein student named Jeremy Zhang entered and won the Eckstein Logo Contest. The Logo consists of the Letter 'E', representing the Eckstein community, and various Eagle heads symbolizing the students of the school. The wings represents the teachers and staff who help and support the students.

=== 75th Anniversary Design ===
In 2025 a logo was designed to mark Eckstein's 75th year celebration. It features an eagle head on the number seven and two wings on the five.

== Sports ==
=== Basketball ===
The 2022 boys basketball team won one of their games with only one second left on the clock. They took the championship game with a technique called "The Laettner.”

=== Lacrosse ===
At the beginning of the 2024 school year The Eckstein Weekly mentioned an Intro to Lacrosse meetup. It was described in further detail at the bottom of the news-article and took place at Jane Addams Middle School.

== Notable alumni ==
- Aaron Brooks, NBA player
- Ann Dunham, Barack Obama's mother.
- Mike McCready, Lead Guitarist of Pearl Jam
- Duff McKagan, bass guitarist of Guns N' Roses
- Pam Nolte, co-founder of Taproot Theatre
- Solea Pfeiffer, Broadway actor and musician

== Additional Links ==
- Seattle Public Schools website
- Wedgwood in Seattle History article on Eckstein Middle School.
