= Nathan Eckstein =

American businessman

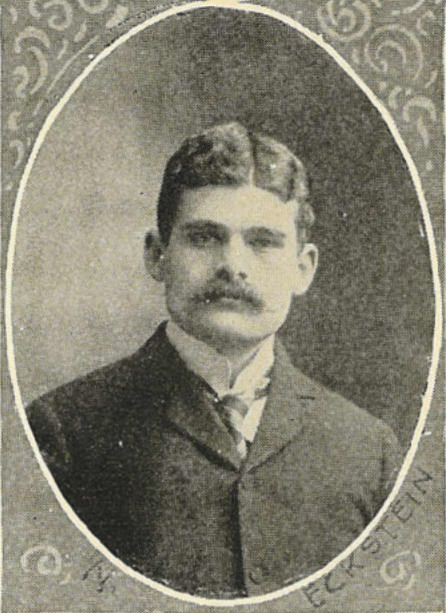
Nathan Eckstein, 1900

Nathan Eckstein (January 10, 1873 – October 21, 1945) was a German-born American businessman, associated in business and by marriage with the Schwabacher Brothers firm and family. In 1926 he received the honor of being named the first "Seattle's Most Useful Citizen", an honor sponsored by the Seattle Post-Intelligencer and chosen by service clubs and community organizations. At that time, Seattle's Jewish Transcript called him "the man who has brought the greatest amount of respect and prestige to the Jewish people of Seattle." Seattle's Nathan Eckstein Middle School is named in his honor.

== Life and career ==
Eckstein was born to Lazarus Eckstein and Johanna Haas in Oberlauringen, Bavaria, in 1873. As a young child, his family moved from his father's ancestral village to his mother's family home in a nearby Reckendorf. After two years of the only formal education he attended, a gymnasium education in Munich, he immigrated to New York City, where he spent a decade in the wholesale grocery business beginning in 1888. He worked with his mother's brother, Kalman Haas, for the Haas Brothers business. He came to Seattle in 1898, where he went to work for Seattle wholesaler Schwabachers and Co. and in 1902 married Mina Alice Schwabacher daughter of Abraham Schwabacher, one of the original Schwabacher Brothers.

Eckstein became vice president and later chief executive officer of Schwabachers, guiding the company through both World Wars and the Great Depression. Besides being a member of numerous organizations ranging from the Rainier Club to B'nai B'rith to both the Shrine and Scottish Rite Masons, and a trustee of organizations such as Goodwill Industries and the Seattle Symphony Orchestra, he served on a volunteer basis in numerous public capacities, including on the Seattle School Board (1913–1920), as chair of the Washington State Tax Commission (1921–1922), chair of the Seattle Community Fund (1924, 1925; this was the forerunner of the city's United Way), and as a member of a commission to revise the City Charter (1925). The last resulted in a proposed charter that was defeated by the city's voters. In 1931 there was talk of him running as a Republican for the U.S. Senate, but he declined to do so.

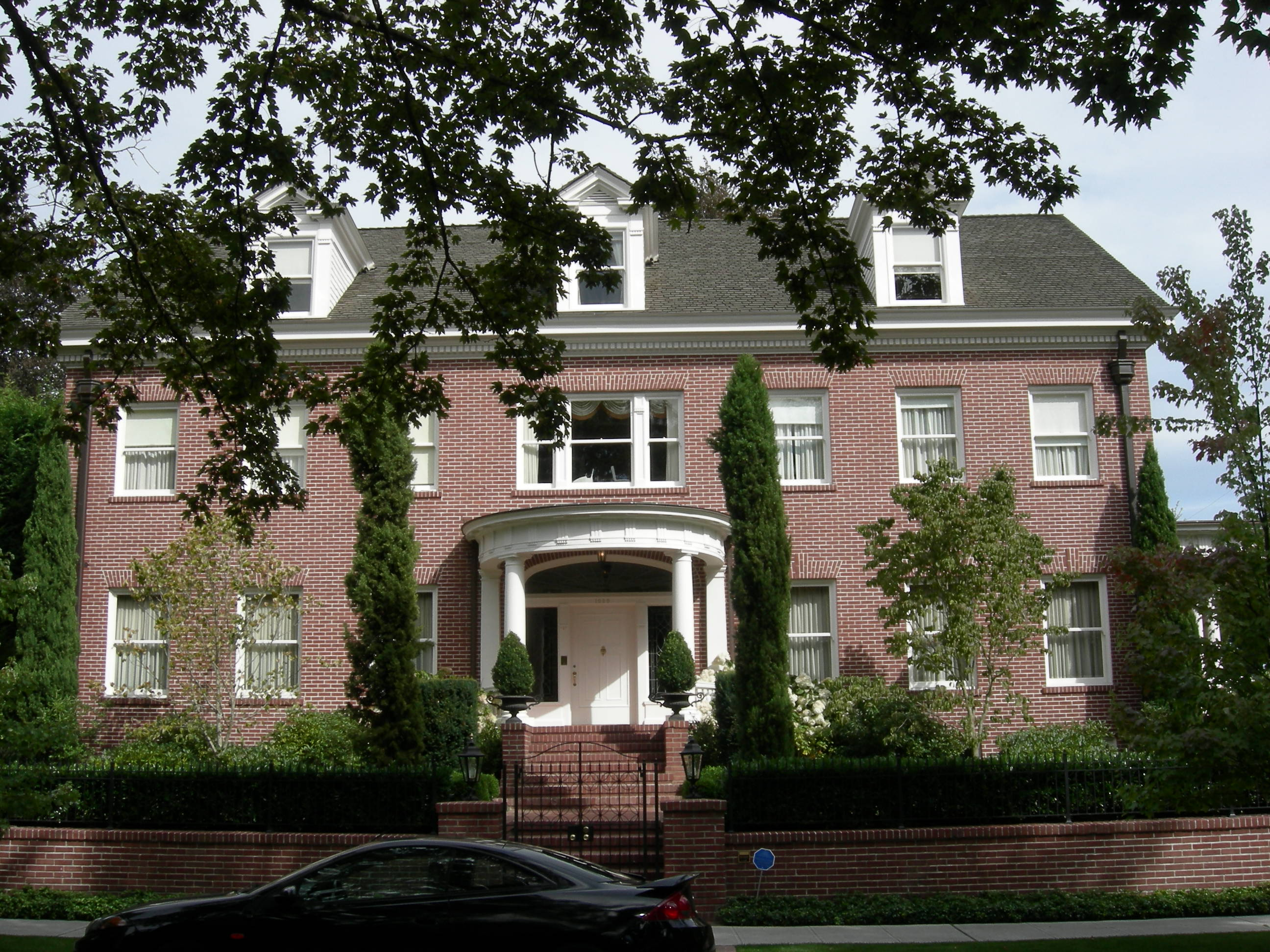
Eckstein's home from 1915 onward.

Eckstein's years on the School Board were controversial. This was during a period of great confrontation between labor and capital in Seattle—the Seattle General Strike of 1919 was the first such action in the United States—and Schwabachers' support for the open shop put Eckstein firmly on capital's side of the divide. The labor unions strongly opposed his candidacy. Eckstein, a naturalized American citizen of German birth, stood with most businessmen in supporting U.S. entry into World War I and even bowed to pressure to drop German language courses from the Seattle Public Schools curriculum.

Eckstein was a proudly believing Jew, and served as president and trustee of Seattle's Temple De Hirsch, now Temple De Hirsch Sinai. "The prejudice under which the Jew is suffering is not due to his religion," he said on one occasion. "The greatest criticism of the Jew is that he is irreligious. If every Jew belonged to a temple or synagogue there would not be one percent of the prejudice that exists today"

By the late 1930s, Eckstein, though still running Schwabachers', had a much-improved relationship with organized labor. In 1937 and 1938, he was part of a citizen's committee that successfully arbitrated in a jurisdictional dispute between the International Longshoremen's Association (ILA) under Harry Bridges and the Teamsters under Dave Beck over organizing inland warehouse workers.

Nathan and Mina Eckstein had two daughters, Johanna "Jo" Eckstein--a noted Seattle philanthropist and patron of the arts—and Bobette "Bob" Eckstein Joseph Levinson.
