= GeSoLei =

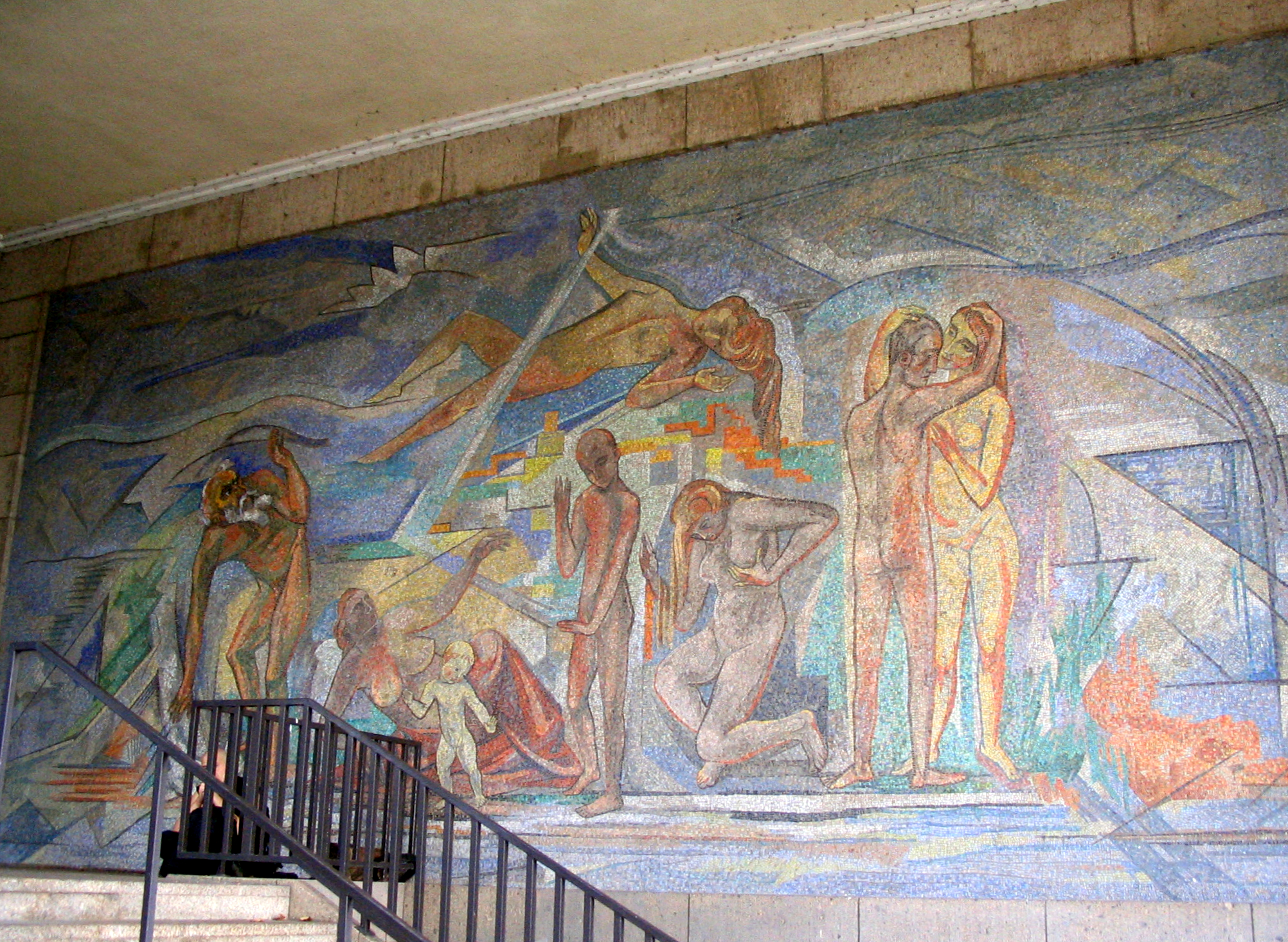
Mosaic by Heinrich Nauen commissioned for the Tonhalle, built for the GeSoLei

The GeSoLei (German: Große Ausstellung Düsseldorf 1926 für Gesundheitspflege, soziale Fürsorge und Leibesübungen) was the largest trade fair in Germany during the Weimar Republic. It attracted 7.5 million visitors. The name was constructed from an abbreviation of abbreviations of the German words for public health (Ge), social welfare (So), physical exercise (Lei).

Surviving features of the event include the Tonhalle which at the time of its completion was the largest planetarium in the world, built by Wilhelm Kreis.

== Publication ==
As part of its "social hygiene" activities, the GeSoLei engaged in extensive publishing efforts. From the summer of 1925 to the summer of 1926, a daily newspaper and a magazine titled Gesolei were published, featuring numerous articles focused primarily on social policy. In 1925–1926, film director and experimental filmmaker Walter Ruttmann, in collaboration with Lotte Lendesdorff and Julius Pinschewer, created a three-minute animated film for the exhibition titled Der Aufstieg (The Ascent). The film propagated the renewal of the Deutscher Michel (German Michael).

== Links ==
- Contemporary footage with German commentary
- Der Aufstieg (The Climb) a short film by Walter Ruttmann and Julius Pinschewer advertising the GeSoLei
