= Tonhalle Düsseldorf =

Concert hall in Düsseldorf, Germany

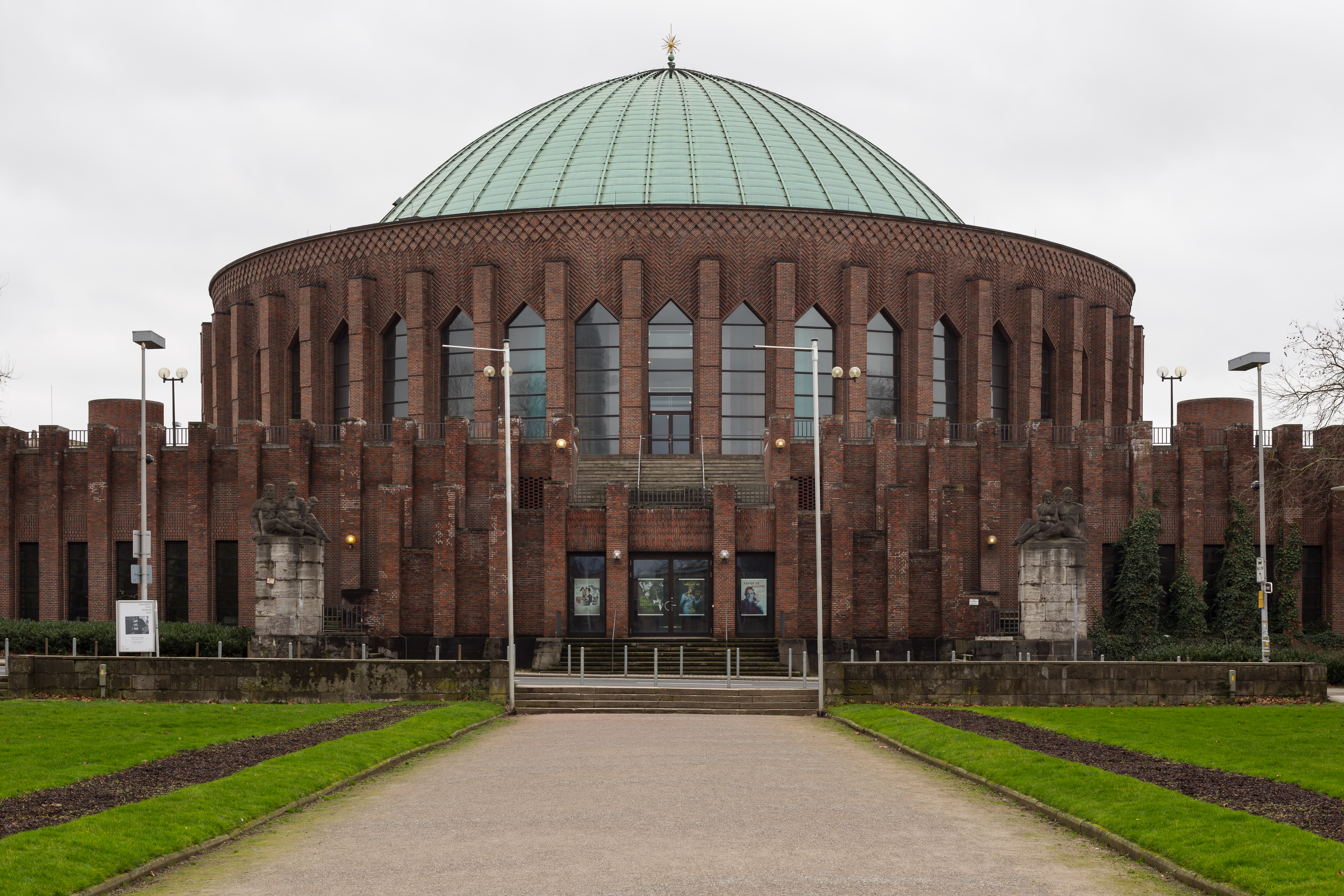
- Interactive map of Tonhalle Düsseldorf
- Former names: Lyric Theatre
- Coordinates: 51.232°N 6.773°E
- Seating type: Reserve
- Capacity: 1,854
- Type: Concert hall

Construction
- Built: 1926

Website
- www.tonhalle.de

Tonhalle Düsseldorf is a concert hall in Düsseldorf. It was built by the architect Wilhelm Kreis. The resident orchestra, the Düsseldorfer Symphoniker, play symphonic repertoire at the Tonhalle as well as opera at the Deutsche Oper am Rhein.

== History ==
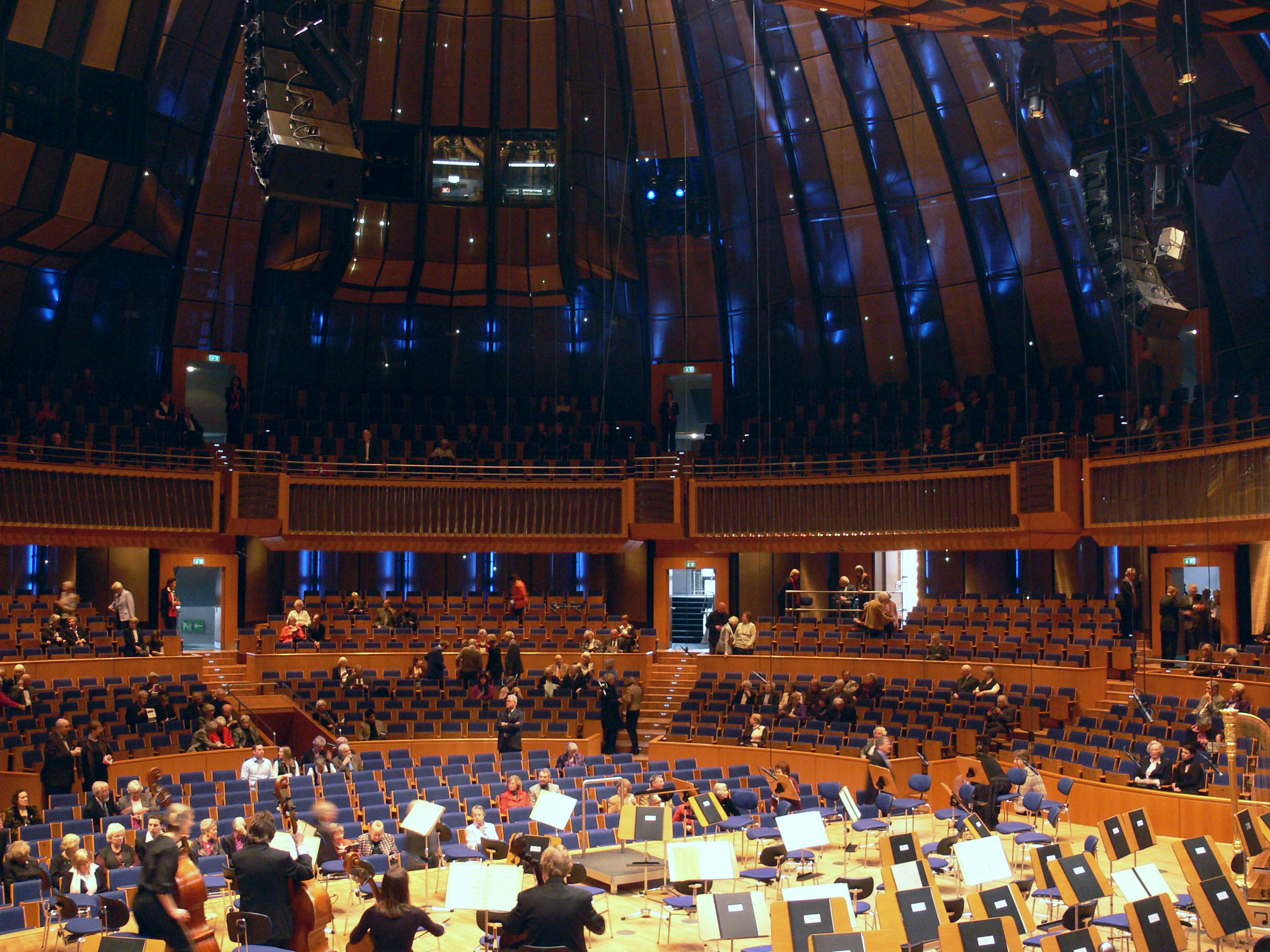
Main concert hall

It was built in 1926 for the GeSoLei exhibition as a planetarium, the biggest in the world at the point of construction. During the 1970s it was converted into a concert hall.
