= Heinrich Nauen =

German painter (1880–1940)

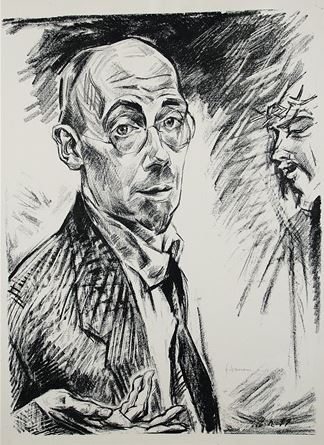
Self-portrait (1919)

Heinrich Nauen (1 June 1880 – 26 November 1940) was a German Expressionist artist. He created oils, watercolors, and prints; as well as murals and mosaics. A large part of his output consists of landscapes and floral still-lifes.

== Biography ==
He was born in Krefeld to a family of bakers, but expressed an interest in art at an early age. In 1898, he was accepted at the Kunstakademie Düsseldorf, and then attended a private art school in Munich. He completed his studies at the Staatliche Akademie der Bildenden Künste Stuttgart from 1900 to 1902. Soon after, he joined the circle of artists that formed around the sculptor George Minne in the Flemish village of Sint-Martens-Latem.

In 1905, he married the artist, Marie von Malachowski-Nauen and accompanied her to Paris. There, he came under the influence of Fauvism and the works of Van Gogh. In 1906, they moved to Berlin, where he became a member of the Berlin Secession and was elected to the board of the Deutscher Künstlerbund. He and Max Beckmann discussed the possibility of forming a new "Secession", but his career largely came to a standstill there.

Things worked out differently in the Rheinland, where he spent most of the spring and summer at several locations. His large format painting "The Harvest" was displayed in Paris in 1910 and brought a letter of appreciation from Henri Matisse. The following year, he left Berlin for good and settled near Brüggen, taking a wing of Schloss Dilborn for his studio. Many of his works were done in the garden and surrounding forests. Regular visitors there included Heinrich Campendonk, Erich Heckel, Franz Marc and August Macke. His first solo exhibition came in 1914, sponsored by the art collector Alfred Flechtheim at his gallery in Düsseldorf.

This happy situation was temporarily disrupted by the war. He was inducted into the army and assigned to an artillery regiment but, after being in combat only briefly and being exposed to poison gas, he was engaged as a war artist instead. In 1917, he was awarded the Iron Cross. In 1918, after the war, he became one of the co-founders of the artists' group, Young Rhineland.

In 1921, he received an appointment as a Professor at the Kunstakademie Düsseldorf. His notable students included Hermann Hundt, Julo Levin, Franz Monjau, Jean Paul Schmitz, Hannes Schultze-Froitzheim and Ernst Walsken.

In 1937, his works were classified as "degenerate art" by the Nazi government and he was forced to retire. Several of his paintings were displayed at the Degenerate Art Exhibition in Munich. After that, he and Marie retired to the town of Kalkar, where he died of stomach cancer two years later. His grave there now has a monument; created by Joseph Beuys, after a design by Ewald Mataré.

== Selected paintings ==
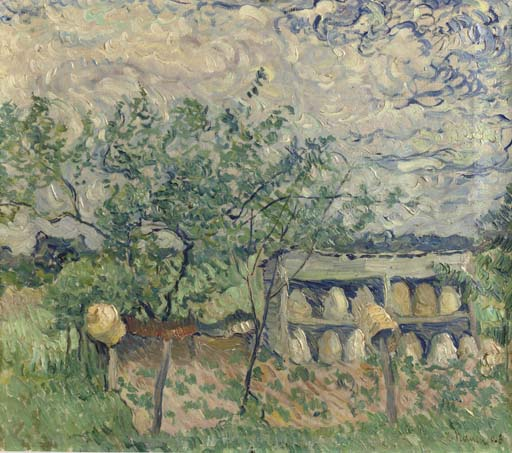
Beehives in the Garden

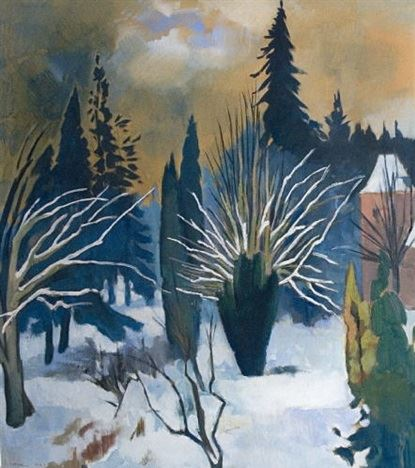
The Park in Dilborn

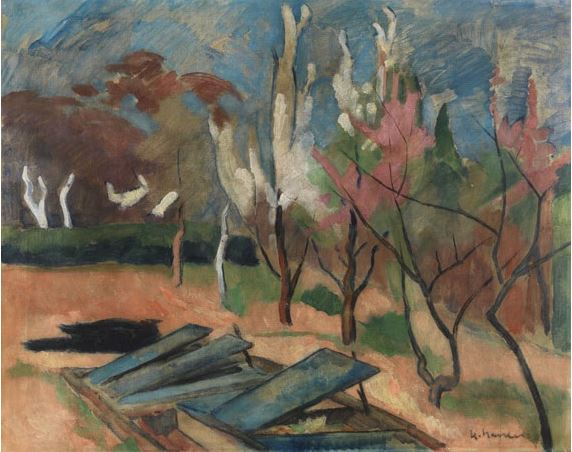
Garden with Greenhouse Beds

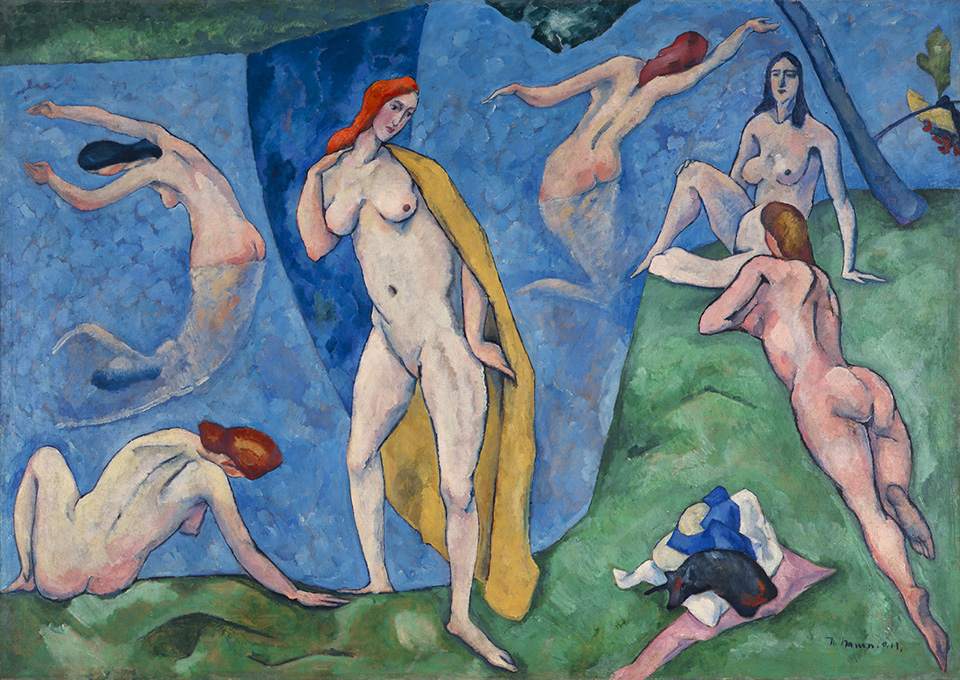
Bathing Women

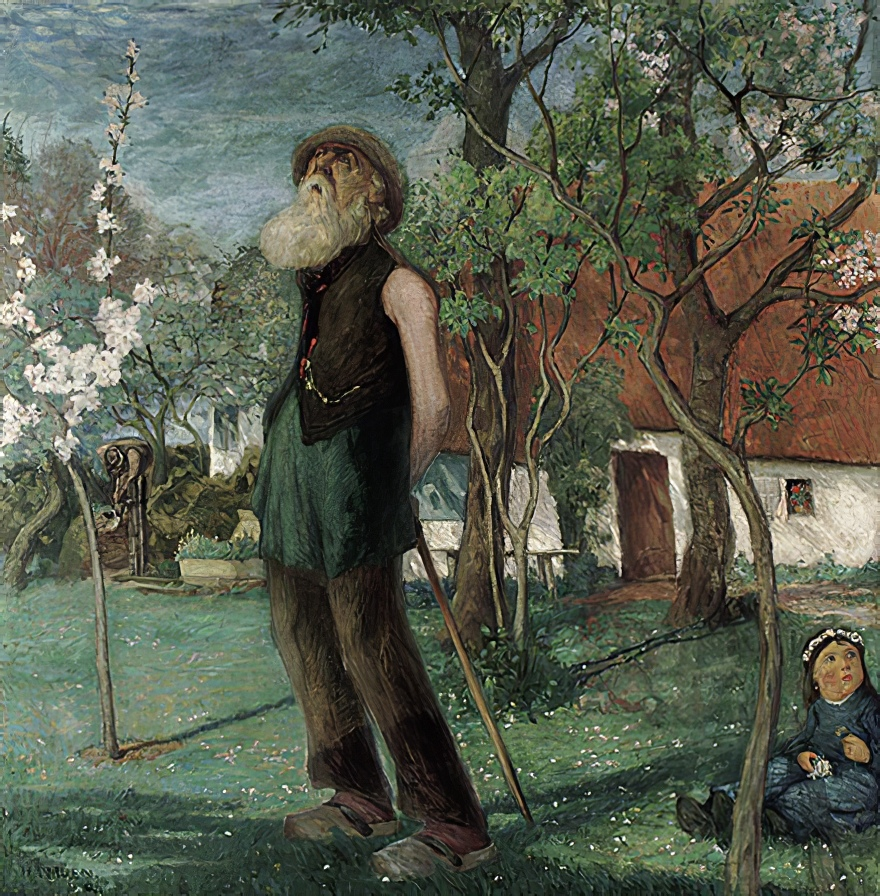
Old Man and Young Girl in the Garden
