= Eckstein (cigarette) =

German cigarette brand

Eckstein No. 5
- An old German pack of Eckstein No. 5 cigarettes.
- Product type: Cigarette
- Current owner: Reemtsma, a subsidiary of Imperial Tobacco
- Produced by: Reemtsma, a subsidiary of Imperial Tobacco
- Country: German Empire
- Introduced: 1854; 172 years ago
- Discontinued: 2015
- Markets: See #Markets?Markets
- Previous owners: Tobacco Manufakturisten Abraham M. Eckstein

Eckstein No. 5 was the oldest still existing German brand of cigarettes which was owned by Reemtsma, a subsidiary of Imperial Tobacco

== History ==
This brand of cigarettes was manufactured since 1854 by the German Jewish tobacco manufacturer Abraham M. Eckstein in Göttingen. His sons moved production to Dresden in 1891. The cigarette company of Halpaus to the Eckstein Halpaus was adopted in the 1920s by the former Cologne cigarette company Haus Neuerburg and immediately merged the company A. M. Eckstein & sons with Breslauer's company, which in turn was acquired in 1935 after cooperation with Reemtsma started in 1928, who hold the trademark rights to this day. The brand was discontinued in August 2015.

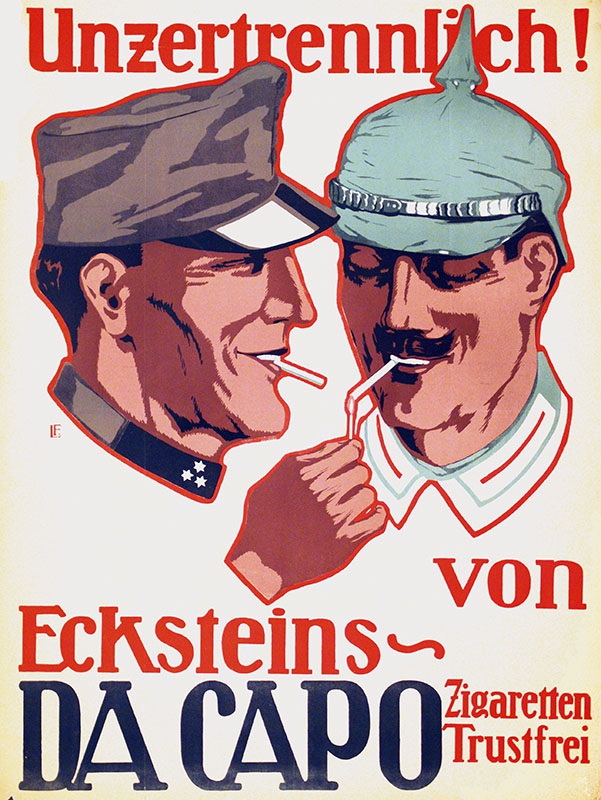
An old poster of the Eckstein Capo cigarettes from the Österreichische Nationalbibliothek

Eckstein cigarettes were always unfiltered. The slogan printed on the back of each pack is: "Real and right", located on the side of the package product characteristics of the manufacturer the following slogan is written: "Fine tobacco, through and through spicy. Without the filter, an honest enjoyment."

In addition to other products, the cigarette brand also belonged to the 1930s range cigarette brand Da Capo, from which there is a well-known poster from the time of World War I.

In 2015, the brand was discontinued.

== Markets ==
Eckstein cigarettes were mainly sold in the German Empire, but were also sold in the Weimar Republic, Nazi Germany, Allied-occupied Germany, West Germany and Germany.

== Products ==
- Eckstein No. 5

Below are all the current brands of Eckstein cigarettes sold, with the levels of tar, nicotine and carbon monoxide included.

Pack	Tar	Nicotine	Carbon monoxide
Eckstein No. 5	10 mg	0,9 mg	10 mg

== See also ==
- Tobacco smoking
