= Düsseldorf =

Capital of North Rhine-Westphalia, Germany

Düsseldorf Düsseldörp (Low Franconian) Düsseldörp (Ripuarian)
- City
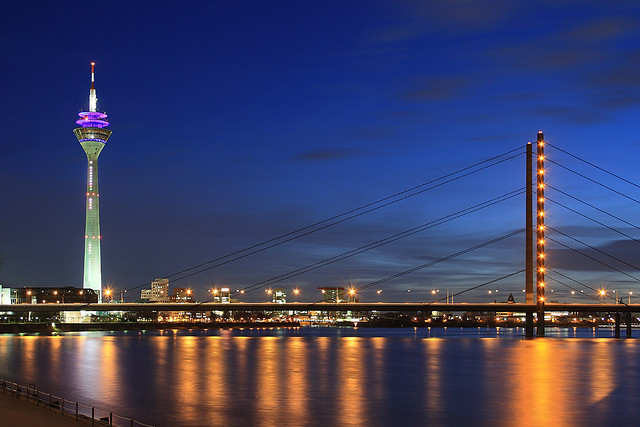
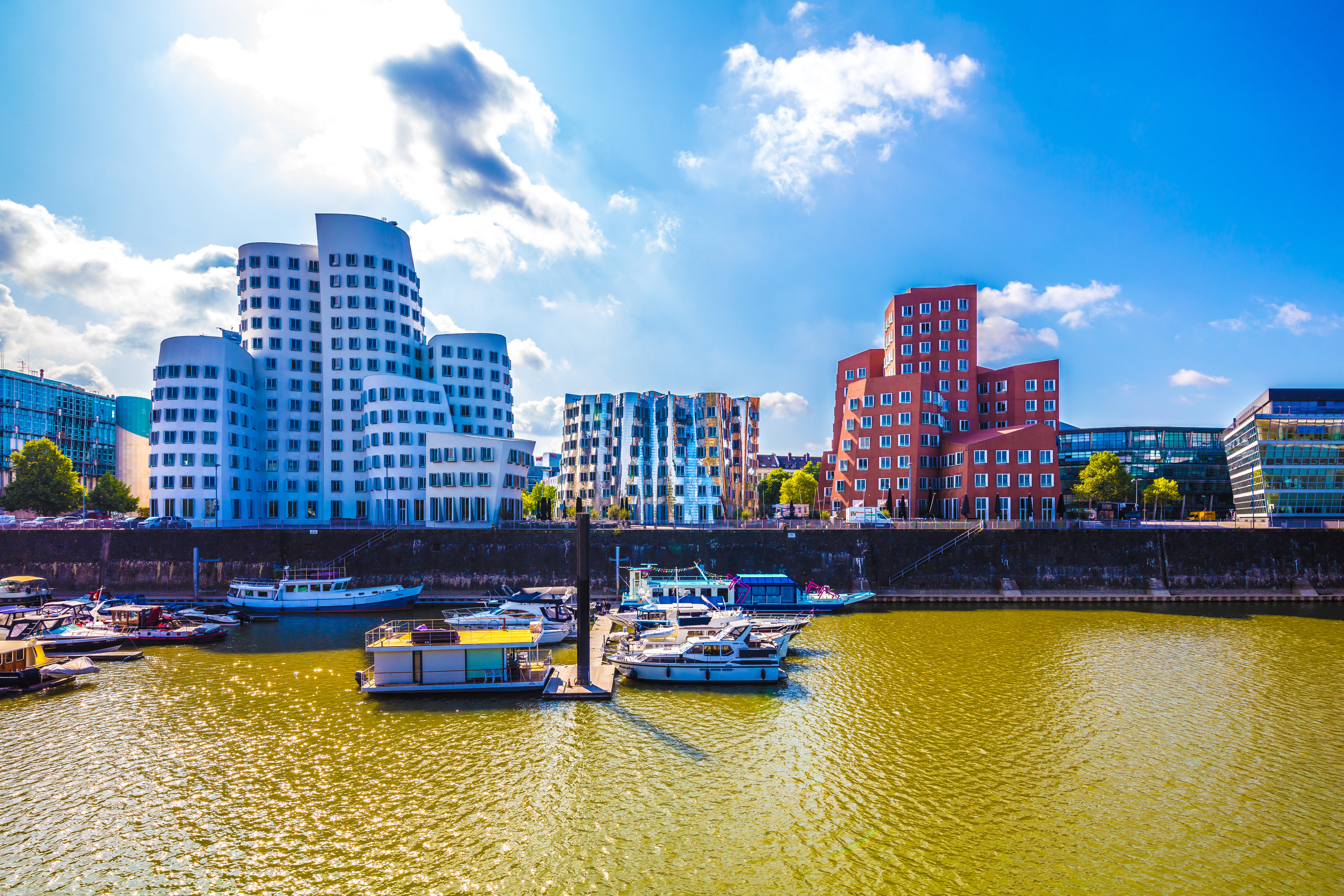
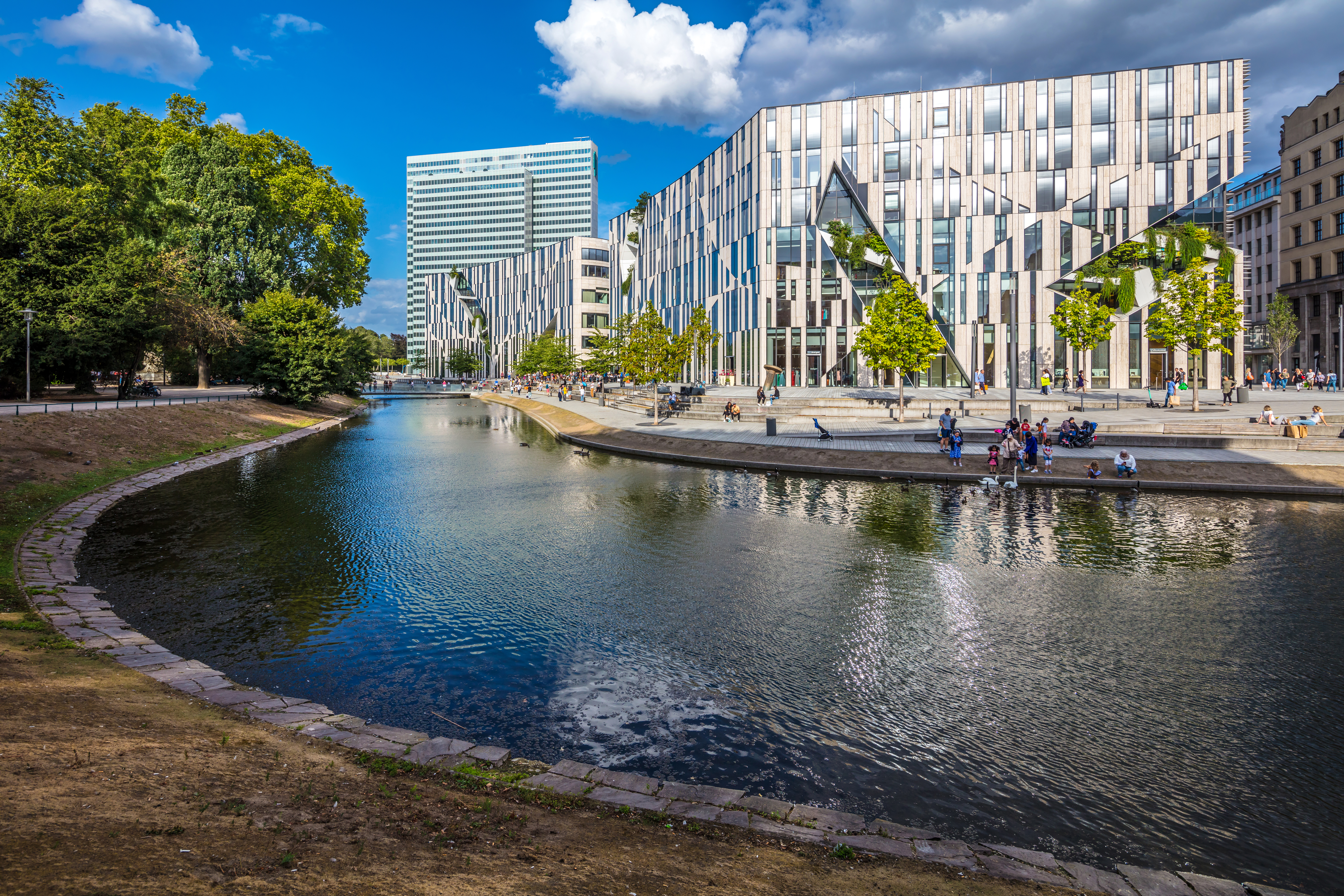
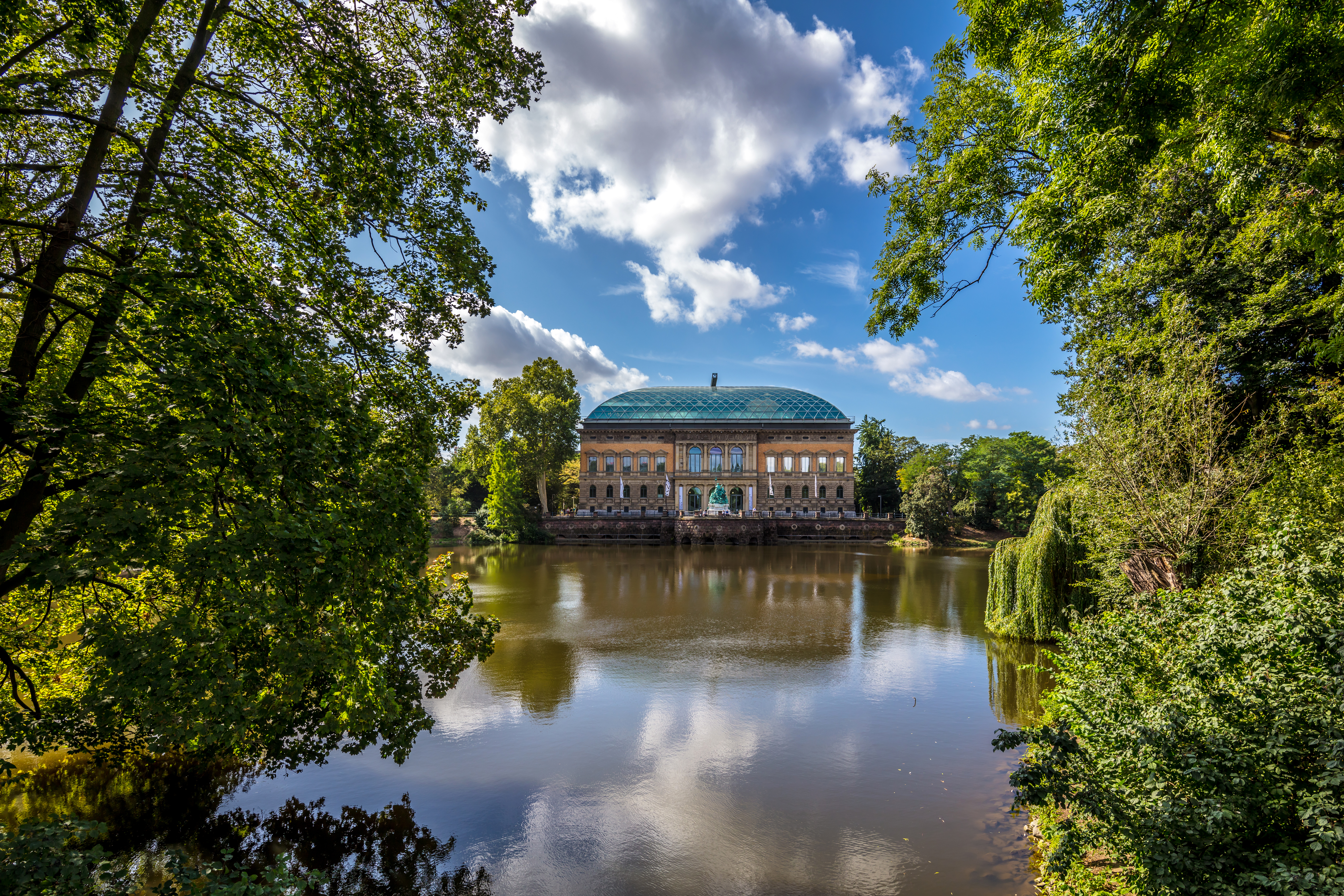
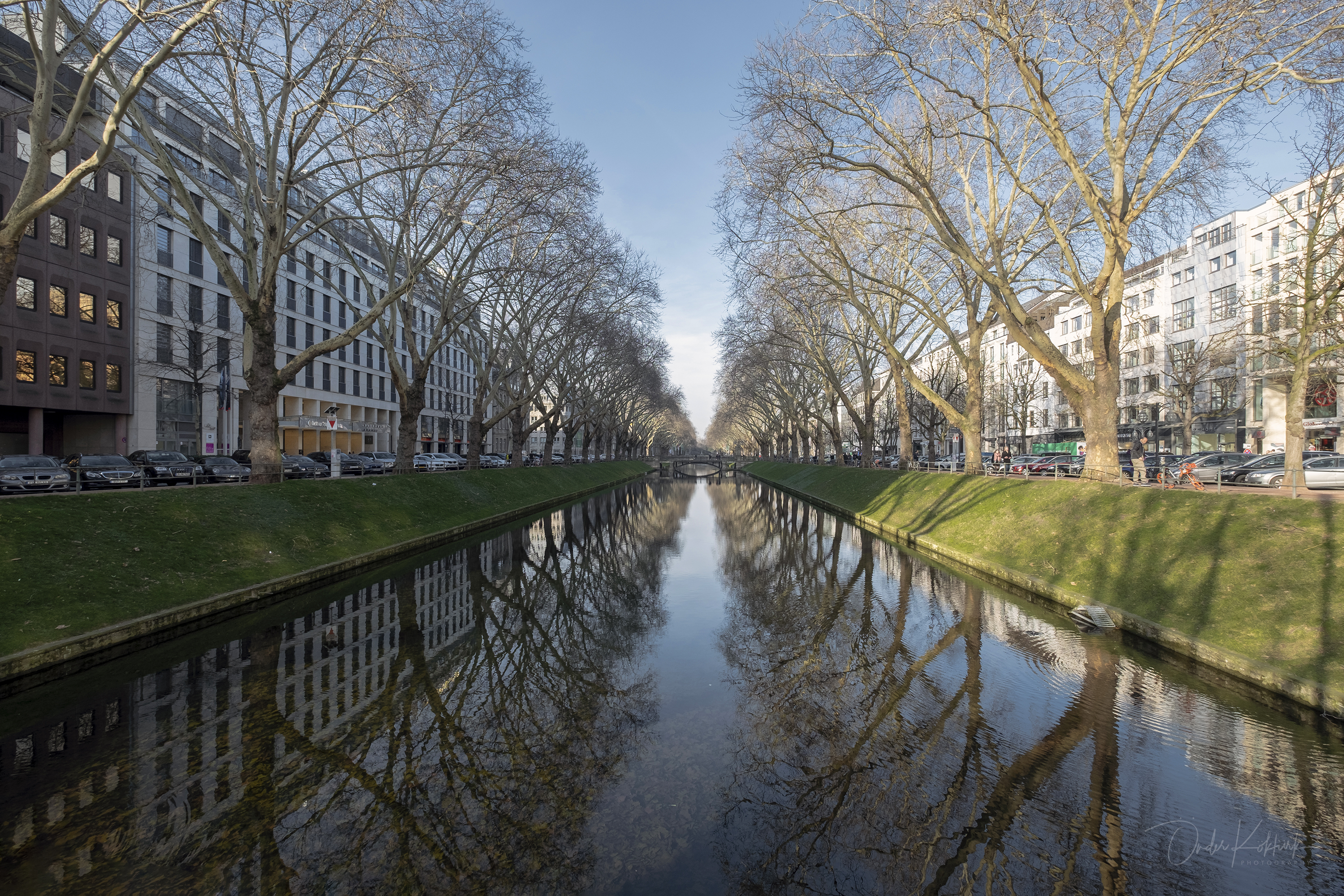
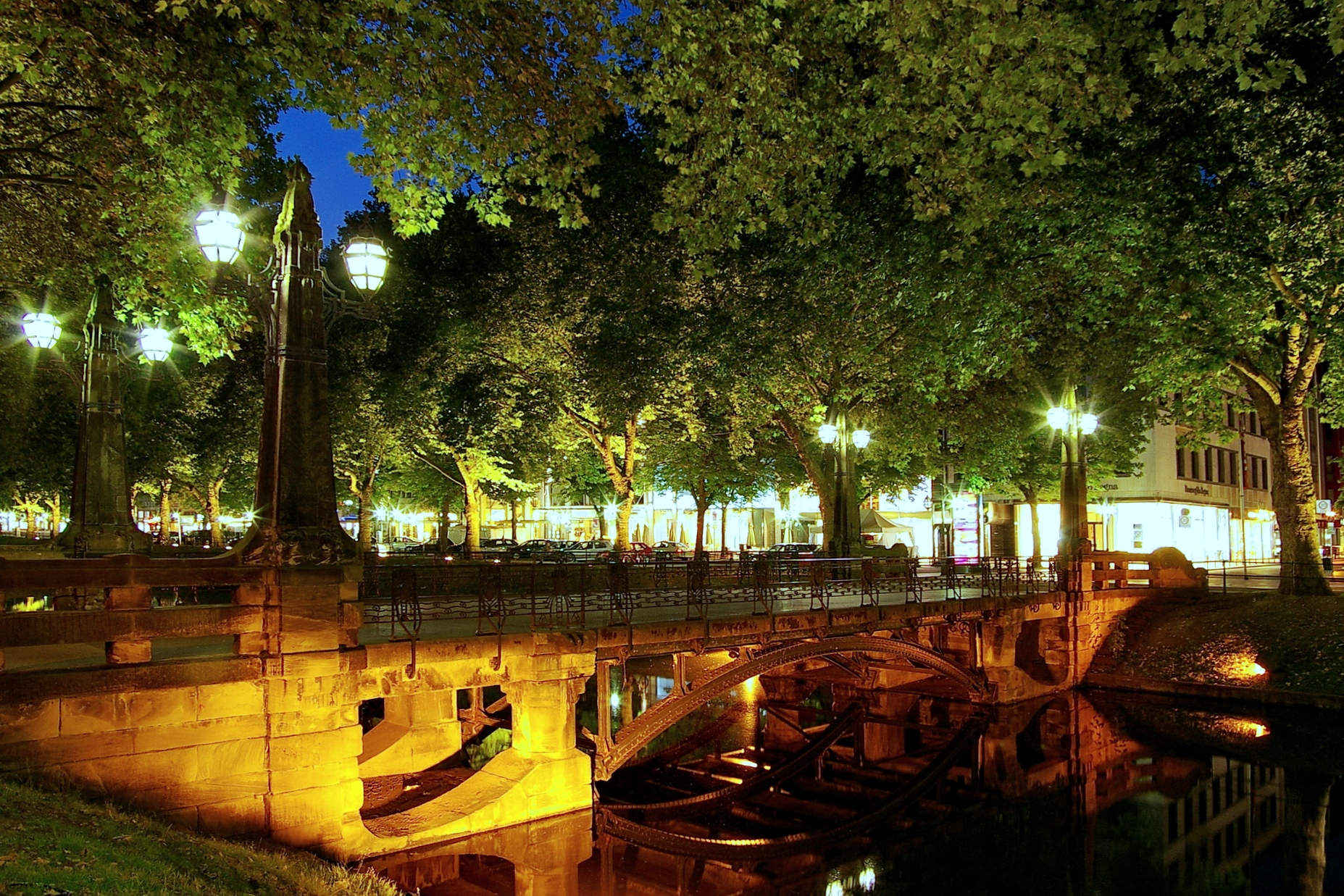
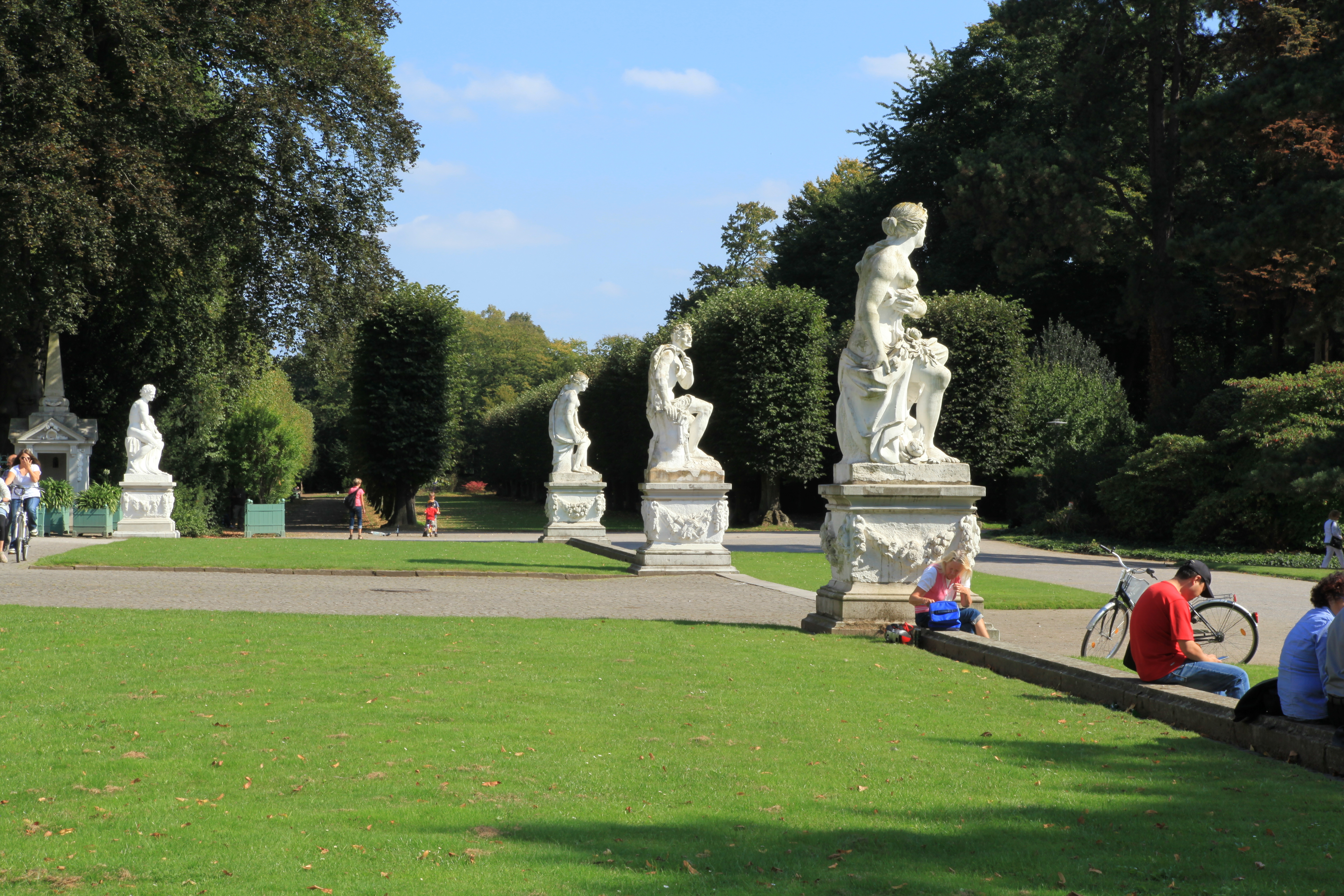
- Nightly view of Düsseldorf with illuminated Rhine Tower and Rheinkniebrücke over the Rhine Neuer Zollhof Kö-Bogen Ständehaus Königsallee Girardet Bridge Gardens of Benrath Palace

- Flag Coat of arms

- Location of Düsseldorf
- Interactive map of Düsseldorf
- Location within Germany Location within North Rhine-Westphalia
- Coordinates: 51°13′32″N 6°46′36″E
- Country: Germany
- State: North Rhine-Westphalia
- Admin. region: Düsseldorf
- Subdivisions: 10 boroughs, 50 quarters

Government
  - Mayor (2025–30): Stephan Keller (CDU)
  - Governing parties: CDU/ Greens

Area
  - City: 217.41 km^{2} (83.94 sq mi)
- Elevation: 38 m (125 ft)

Population (2025-12-31)
  - City: 619,444
  - Density: 2,849.2/km^{2} (7,379.4/sq mi)
  - Urban: 1,500,000
  - Metro: 11,300,000 (Rhine-Ruhr)
- Time zone: UTC+01:00 (CET)
  - Summer (DST): UTC+02:00 (CEST)
- Postal codes: 40210–40629
- Dialling codes: 0211, 0203, 02104
- Vehicle registration: D
- Website: duesseldorf.de

Düsseldorf (German: [ˈdʏsl̩dɔʁf]) (Note: English: /ˈdʊsəldɔːrf/ DUUSS-əl-dorf (US also /ˈdjuːs-/ DEWSS-); Low Franconian and Ripuarian: Düsseldörp [ˈdʏsəldœʀəp]; archaic Dutch: Dusseldorp [ˈdʏsəlˌdɔr(ə)p]) is the capital city of North Rhine-Westphalia, the most populous state of Germany. It is the second-largest city in the state after Cologne and the seventh-largest city in Germany, with a 2025 population of 619,444. Most of Düsseldorf lies on the right bank of the Rhine, and the city has grown together with Neuss, Krefeld, Hilden, Langenfeld, Ratingen, Meerbusch, Dormagen, Erkrath, Solingen, and Monheim. Düsseldorf is the central city of Rhine-Ruhr, the second-biggest metropolitan region by GDP in the European Union, which stretches from Bonn via Cologne and Düsseldorf to the Ruhr.

Düsseldorf began as a small settlement at the mouth of the Düssel River, gaining city rights in 1288 after the Battle of Worringen. In the Late Middle Ages and Renaissance, it grew into a regional political and cultural centre under the Dukes of Berg and later as the capital of the United Duchies of Jülich-Cleves-Berg. The 17th and 18th centuries saw flourishing arts and architecture, with Düsseldorf becoming known for its court culture and early art academy. During the Napoleonic era, it was briefly part of the Grand Duchy of Berg before coming under Prussian control in 1815, where it industrialised rapidly in the 19th century. During the 20th century, Düsseldorf developed into one of Germany's most important centres for administration, business, and culture. In 1946, it became the capital of the newly created state of North Rhine-Westphalia, strengthening its political role.

Düsseldorf is classified as a GaWC Alpha- world city. It is an international business and financial centre, known for its fashion and trade fairs, and is headquarters to two Fortune Global 500 (Uniper and Metro) and three DAX companies (Rheinmetall, Henkel and GEA). Messe Düsseldorf organises nearly one-fifth of premier trade shows. Düsseldorf Airport is Germany's fourth-busiest airport, serving as the main international hub for the Ruhr, Germany's largest urban area. Mercer's 2023 Quality of Living survey ranked Düsseldorf the tenth most livable city in the world.

There are 22 institutions of higher education in the city including the Heinrich-Heine-Universität Düsseldorf, the university of applied sciences (Hochschule Düsseldorf), the academy of arts (Kunstakademie Düsseldorf, whose members include Joseph Beuys, Emanuel Leutze, August Macke, Gerhard Richter, Sigmar Polke, and Andreas Gursky), and the university of music (Robert-Schumann-Musikhochschule Düsseldorf). The city is also known for its influence on electronic/experimental music (Kraftwerk) and its Japanese community. As the second-largest city of the Rhineland, Düsseldorf holds Rhenish Carnival celebrations in February and March, which rank as the third most prominent in Germany after those of Cologne and Mainz.

== Etymology ==
The name Düsseldorf is derived from the small river Düssel, which joins the Rhine at the city's location. The suffix -dorf (German for "village") reflects the original character of the settlement as a fishing and farming community on the riverbanks. Thus, the literal meaning of Düsseldorf is "village on the Düssel."

As the settlement expanded and developed into a regional and later international centre, the name remained unchanged. Düsseldorf is unusual among Germany's major cities in having retained the -dorf suffix, which is otherwise mostly associated with small villages.

In the Limburgish language, called Düsseldorfer Platt, the city is called Düsseldörp.

== History ==
=== Early development ===
When the Roman Empire was strengthening its position throughout Europe, a few Germanic tribes clung on in marshy territory off the eastern banks of the Rhine. In the 7th and 8th centuries, the odd farming or fishing settlement could be found at the point where the small river Düssel flows into the Rhine. It was from such settlements that the city of Düsseldorf grew.

The first mention of Düsseldorf dates from 1135 to 1159; in 1162 it was referred to as Thusseldorp. Under Emperor Friedrich Barbarossa the small town of Kaiserswerth to the north of Düsseldorf became a well-fortified outpost, where soldiers kept a watchful eye on every movement on the Rhine. Kaiserswerth eventually became a suburb of Düsseldorf in 1929.

=== Duchy of Berg ===
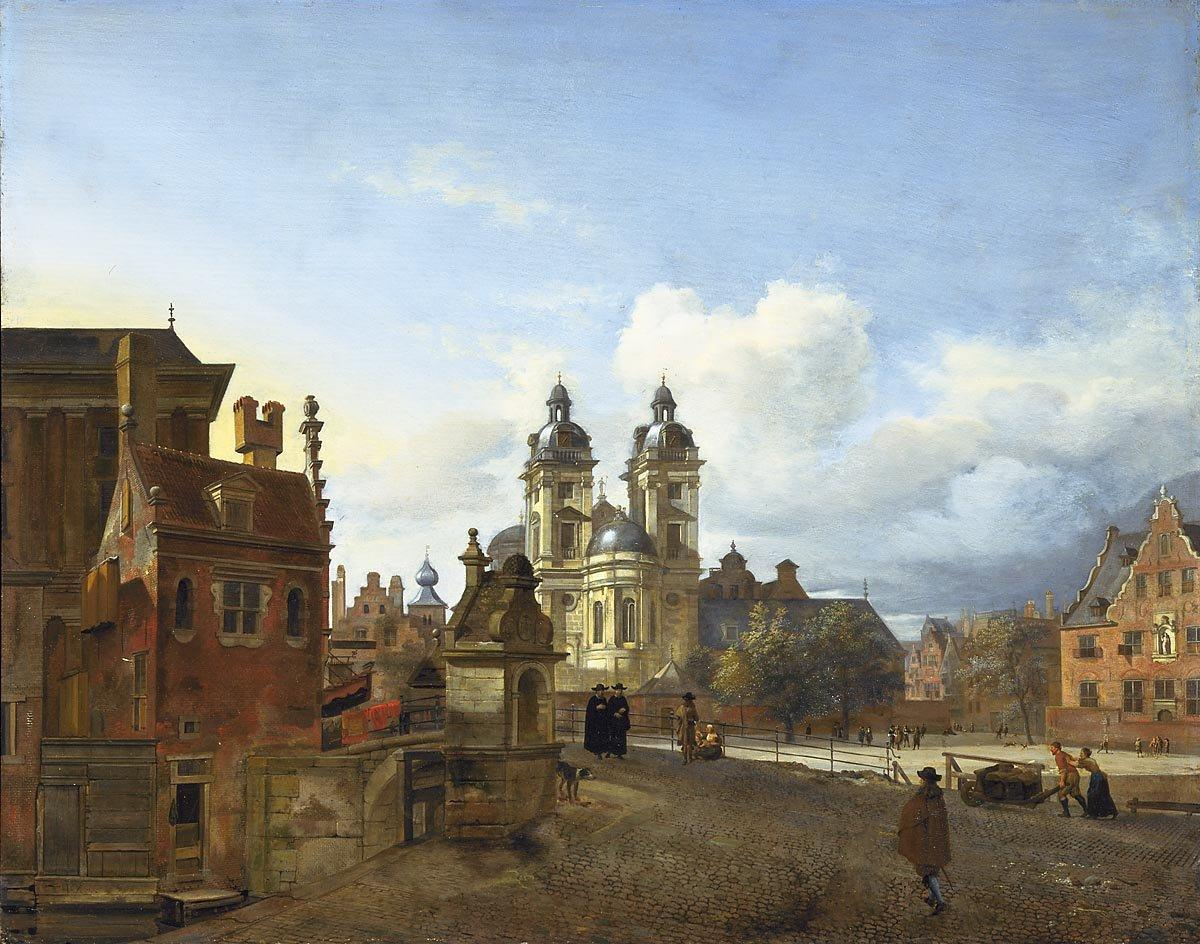
View of Düsseldorf with the church of St. Andrew in the centre, 1667, painted by Jan van der Heyden and the Adriaen van de Velde

In 1186, Düsseldorf came under the rule of the County of Berg, a state of the Holy Roman Empire. Around 1206, the settlement was likely separated from the parish of Bilk and became an independent parish. In 1263, the Count of Berg granted ferry rights to the inhabitants.

14 August 1288 is one of the most important dates in the history of Düsseldorf, the day the sovereign Count Adolf VIII of Berg granted town privileges to the village on the banks of the Düssel. Before this, a bloody struggle for power had taken place between the Archbishop of Cologne and his allies arrayed against the count of Berg and other local powers, culminating in the Battle of Worringen. The Archbishop of Cologne's forces were wiped out by the forces of the count of Berg, who were supported by citizens and farmers of Cologne and Düsseldorf, paving the way for Düsseldorf's elevation to city status, which is commemorated today by a monument on the Burgplatz.

After this battle the relationship between Cologne and Düsseldorf deteriorated, because they were commercial rivals; it is often said that there is a kind of hostility between the citizens of Cologne and Düsseldorf. Today, it finds its expression mainly in a humorous form (especially during the Rhineland Karneval) and in sports.

In the first century following its founding, Düsseldorf developed only slowly. It was not until the rule of William II of Berg, who became Duke in 1380, that the town experienced significant growth. He expanded Düsseldorf by establishing a new town, increasing its area to about 22.5 hectares. William also enlarged the ducal palace and commissioned the construction of stone fortifications around the entire settlement. During the following centuries several famous landmarks were built, including the Collegiate Church of St Lambertus. In 1609, the ducal line of the United Duchies of Jülich-Cleves-Berg died out, and after a violent struggle over succession, Jülich and Berg fell to the Wittelsbach Counts of Palatinate-Neuburg, who made Düsseldorf their main domicile.

Under the art-loving Johann Wilhelm II (r. 1690–1716), a vast art collection comprising numerous paintings and sculptures was established in the Stadtschloss (city palace). After his death, the city fell on hard times again, especially after Elector Charles Theodore inherited Bavaria and moved the electoral court to Munich. With him he took the art collection, which became part of what is now the Alte Pinakothek in Munich.

Destruction and poverty struck Düsseldorf after the Napoleonic Wars. Napoleon made Berg a Grand Duchy and Düsseldorf its capital. In 1806, Joachim Murat (1767–1815) became Grand Duke of Berg but handed power over to Napoleon in 1808. Düsseldorf was visited by Napoleon in November 1811. Johann Devaranne, a leader of Solingen's resistance to Napoleon's conscription decrees, was executed in the city in 1813.

=== Prussia ===
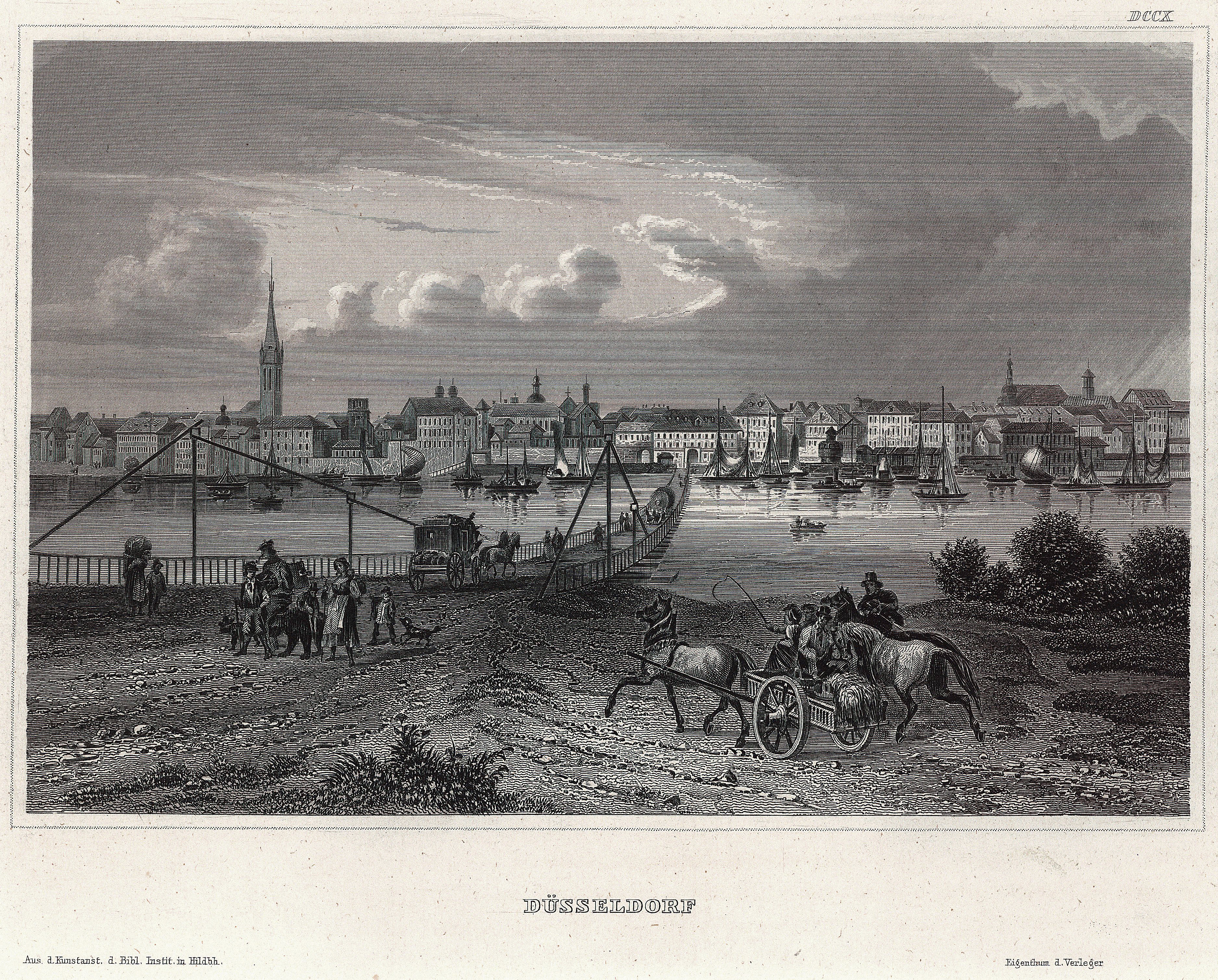
View of Düsseldorf around 1850

Following the Congress of Vienna in 1815, the Rhineland including Düsseldorf was incorporated into the Kingdom of Prussia. Düsseldorf lost its status as a capital, but became the seat of a regional governor and of the Rhenish provincial diet established in 1824. In 1820, the city lost its municipal independence and was incorporated into the District of Düsseldorf, to which it belonged until 1872.

In the first half of the 19th century Düsseldorf earned the nickname "City of Art and Gardens." Prominent painters such as Peter von Cornelius and Wilhelm von Schadow, composers including Friedrich August Burgmüller, Felix Mendelssohn, and Robert Schumann, and writers like Karl Leberecht Immermann and Christian Dietrich Grabbe shaped Düsseldorf's cultural life.

During the period of industrialisation, Düsseldorf benefited from its favourable location on the Rhine, its proximity to the Ruhr region, opportunities to expand into the surrounding areas, and its connection to various railway lines. From the 1850s onwards, numerous industrial enterprises, particularly in the iron, steel, and chemical industries, settled in Düsseldorf, greatly increasing the demand for labour. The city also developed into a centre for associations, trade unions, and corporate headquarters, growing into an important industrial and commercial city by the end of the 19th century. Düsseldorf's population grew from 40,000 in 1850 to 100,000 in 1882. In 1908 and 1909, the partially industrialised towns of Wersten, Gerresheim, Eller, Heerdt, Himmelgeist, Ludenberg, Rath, Stockum, and Vennhausen were incorporated into the city.

During World War I, the Royal Naval Air Service (RNS) undertook the first Entente strategic bombing missions on 22 September 1914, when it bombed the Zeppelin bases in Düsseldorf. As both a garrison town and an armaments centre, Düsseldorf was particularly affected by the war.

After the war, the city was occupied by Belgian and British forces after 1918 and by French troops from 1921 to 1925. In 1920, Düsseldorf became the centre of the General Strike that grew out of the resistance to the Kapp Putsch. On 15 April 1920, 45 delegates of the German Miners Union were murdered by the Freikorps.

=== World War II ===
During World War II, Düsseldorf was the location of a Nazi prison with several forced labour subcamps, five subcamps of the Buchenwald concentration camp for mostly Polish and Soviet prisoners, but also French, Dutch, Belgian, Czech, Italian, Yugoslav, and a camp for Sinti and Romani people (see Romani Holocaust). The Rabbi of the Düsseldorf Jewish Community fled to the Netherlands and died in KZ Auschwitz in 1943.

The city was a target of strategic bombing during World War II, particularly during the RAF bombing campaign in 1943 when over 700 bombers were used in a single night. Raids continued late into the war. As part of the campaign against German oil facilities, the RAF raid of 20–21 February 1945 on the Rhenania Ossag refinery in the Reisholz district of the city halted oil production there.

The Allied ground advance into Germany reached Düsseldorf in mid-April 1945. The United States 97th Infantry Division easily captured the city on 18 April 1945, after the local German Resistance group launched Aktion Rheinland.

=== German Federal Republic ===
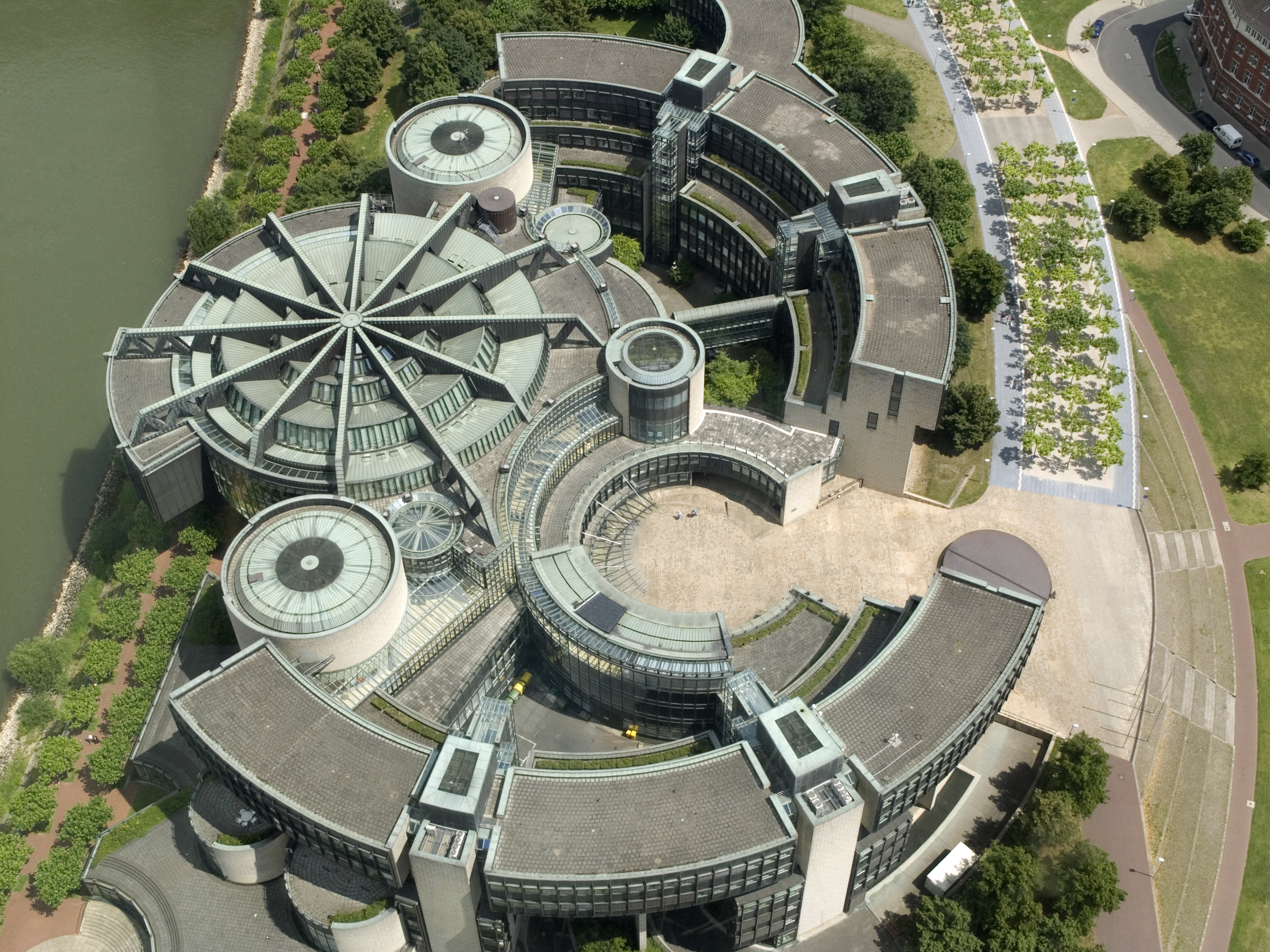
The state parliament, seen from the top of the Rheinturm

Düsseldorf was incorporated into the British occupation zone on 21 June 1945. In 1946, Düsseldorf was made capital of the newly established state of North Rhine-Westphalia. The establishment of ministries and the state parliament gave the city an important political role that it retains to the present day.

The immediate postwar decades were marked by reconstruction. Much of the old town and city centre was rebuilt, though partly in modernist forms rather than historical replicas. Düsseldorf emerged as a key economic hub during the Wirtschaftswunder ("economic miracle") of the 1950s and 1960s, attracting industries such as steel, machinery, chemicals, and banking. From the 1960s onwards, the city developed into one of Germany's most important centres for trade fairs and international business. The Messe Düsseldorf became a leading venue for global exhibitions.

Beginning in the 1950s, the Japanese community of Düsseldorf grew significantly as numerous Japanese companies opened offices in the city. The growing expatriate population led to the founding of the Japanese Club Düsseldorf in 1964. Two years later, in 1966, the Japanese Chamber of Commerce and Industry was established, which formalised the coordination of Japanese corporate interests in Germany. In 1971, the Japanese International School in Düsseldorf was established, followed by the creation of a Japanese garden in Nordpark in 1975. By the 1980s, Düsseldorf hosted the largest Japanese community in Germany. The city developed a distinctive "Little Tokyo" district along Immermannstraße, where Japanese shops, restaurants, and cultural institutions were established.

The late 20th century saw the decline of heavy industry, but the city transitioned towards services, telecommunications, fashion, and advertising. After German reunification in 1990, Düsseldorf consolidated its status as a political, economic, and cultural centre. From the late 20th century, urban renewal measures included the redevelopment of the Medienhafen (Media Harbour), with new buildings designed by international architects.

== Geography ==
Various scenes around Düsseldorf in December 2014

=== Physical geography ===
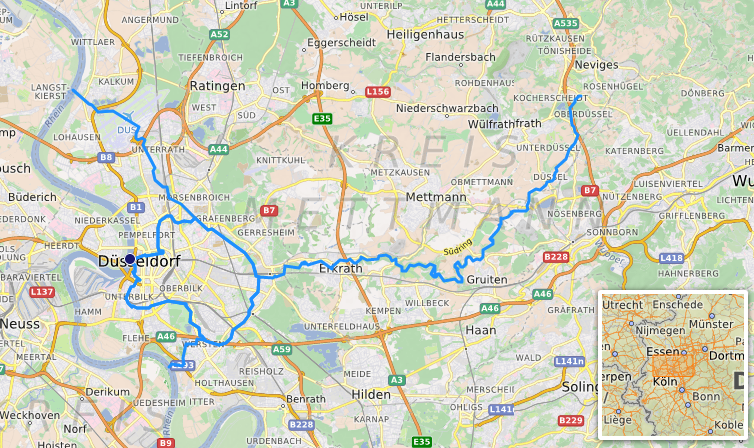
The course of the Düssel from its source in the Düssel Hill Country (Düsselhügelland) (de) through the Neandertal to Düsseldorf, where it forms three bifurcations, dividing into the four branches (from north to south) Kittelbach, Nördliche Düssel, Südliche Düssel and Brückerbach

Düsseldorf lies at the centre of the Lower Rhine basin, where the delta of the Düssel flows into the Rhine. The city lies on the east side of the Rhine, except District 4 (Oberkassel, Niederkassel, Heerdt and Lörick). Across the Rhine, the city of Neuss stands on the delta of the Erft. Düsseldorf lies southwest of the Ruhr urban area, and in the middle of the Rhine-Ruhr metropolitan region.

Düsseldorf is built entirely on alluvium, mud, sand, clay and occasionally gravel. The highest point in Düsseldorf is the top of Sandberg in the far eastern part of the city (Hubbelrath borough) at 165 metres (541 ft). The lowest point is at the far northern end in Wittlaer borough where the Schwarzbach enters the Rhine, with an average elevation of 28 metres (92 ft).

=== Adjacent cities and districts ===
The following districts and cities border Düsseldorf (clockwise starting from the north): the City of Duisburg, the District of Mettmann (Ratingen, Mettmann, Erkrath, Hilden, Langenfeld, and Monheim), and the District of Neuss (Dormagen, Neuss, and Meerbusch).

=== Climate ===
The city has an oceanic climate (Köppen: Cfb, mild in relation to East Germany). Like the rest of the lower Rhineland, Düsseldorf experiences moderate winters with little snowfall and mild to warm summers. The average annual temperature is 11.0 °C (52 °F) with an average yearly precipitation of 751 mm (30 in). The dominant wind direction is from the west with velocities in the range of 3–4 m/s (7–9 mph), with gusts of 3.5–4.8 m/s (7.8–10.7 mph). The wind is calm (defined as being under 2 m/s or 4.5 mph) about 35% of the time, more frequently at night and in the winter.

Climate data for Düsseldorf (1991–2020 normals, extremes 1981–present)
Month	Jan	Feb	Mar	Apr	May	Jun	Jul	Aug	Sep	Oct	Nov	Dec	Year
Record high °C (°F)	17.3 (63.1)	21.0 (69.8)	25.7 (78.3)	28.8 (83.8)	33.8 (92.8)	38.7 (101.7)	40.7 (105.3)	38.5 (101.3)	34.0 (93.2)	27.7 (81.9)	21.0 (69.8)	17.5 (63.5)	40.7 (105.3)
Mean maximum °C (°F)	12.8 (55.0)	13.9 (57.0)	18.9 (66.0)	24.1 (75.4)	27.9 (82.2)	31.5 (88.7)	33.2 (91.8)	32.4 (90.3)	27.3 (81.1)	22.0 (71.6)	16.6 (61.9)	13.1 (55.6)	35.0 (95.0)
Mean daily maximum °C (°F)	6.0 (42.8)	7.2 (45.0)	11.1 (52.0)	15.6 (60.1)	19.4 (66.9)	22.5 (72.5)	24.7 (76.5)	24.2 (75.6)	20.1 (68.2)	15.2 (59.4)	10.0 (50.0)	6.6 (43.9)	15.2 (59.4)
Daily mean °C (°F)	3.4 (38.1)	4.0 (39.2)	6.9 (44.4)	10.5 (50.9)	14.3 (57.7)	17.3 (63.1)	19.4 (66.9)	18.9 (66.0)	15.3 (59.5)	11.2 (52.2)	7.1 (44.8)	4.2 (39.6)	11.0 (51.8)
Mean daily minimum °C (°F)	0.5 (32.9)	0.7 (33.3)	2.6 (36.7)	5.0 (41.0)	8.7 (47.7)	11.7 (53.1)	14.0 (57.2)	13.7 (56.7)	10.7 (51.3)	7.5 (45.5)	3.9 (39.0)	1.5 (34.7)	6.7 (44.1)
Record low °C (°F)	−20.8 (−5.4)	−15.4 (4.3)	−16.1 (3.0)	−6.3 (20.7)	−1.2 (29.8)	2.4 (36.3)	4.8 (40.6)	5.0 (41.0)	0.7 (33.3)	−6.2 (20.8)	−9.4 (15.1)	−15.3 (4.5)	−20.8 (−5.4)
Average precipitation mm (inches)	61.5 (2.42)	56.5 (2.22)	54.1 (2.13)	46.4 (1.83)	61.1 (2.41)	65.7 (2.59)	73.2 (2.88)	77.0 (3.03)	60.3 (2.37)	61.2 (2.41)	63.8 (2.51)	70.0 (2.76)	750.7 (29.56)
Average precipitation days (≥ 0.1 mm)	17.5	15.9	16.1	12.5	13.9	14.1	14.6	14.7	14.2	15.5	17.2	18.8	185.1
Average snowy days (≥ 1.0 cm)	3.4	2.3	0.7	0	0	0	0	0	0	0	0.3	1.8	8.5
Average relative humidity (%)	81.6	78.6	73.5	68.2	68.5	69.3	68.8	70.8	76.5	80.5	83.6	84.3	75.4
Mean monthly sunshine hours	56.9	73.1	125.0	172.6	202.0	199.3	208.2	193.9	149.5	109.8	62.5	47.1	1,610.6
Source 1: NOAA
Source 2: Deutscher Wetterdienst Source 3: Wetterdienst.de

== Demographics ==
With a 2025 population of 619,444 within the city boundaries, Düsseldorf is Germany's seventh largest city. Its population surpassed the threshold of 100,000 inhabitants during the height of industrialisation in 1882, and peaked at just over 705,000 in 1962. The city then began to lose residents, with many moving into neighbouring municipalities. However, since the late 1990s, the city's population has been slowly rising again.

Historical population

Year	Pop.	±% p.a.
1555	3,500	—
1703	7,000	+0.47%
1800	12,102	+0.57%
1871	69,365	+2.49%
1895	175,985	+3.96%
1905	253,274	+3.71%
1919	407,338	+3.45%
1925	432,633	+1.01%
1933	498,600	+1.79%
1939	541,410	+1.38%
1950	500,516	−0.71%
1956	654,850	+4.58%
1961	703,255	+1.44%

Year	Pop.	±% p.a.
1965	704,917	+0.06%
1970	679,435	−0.73%
1975	627,004	−1.59%
1980	590,484	−1.19%
1985	561,726	−0.99%
1990	575,794	+0.50%
1995	571,030	−0.17%
2000	569,364	−0.06%
2005	574,514	+0.18%
2010	588,735	+0.49%
2015	612,178	+0.78%
2020	620,523	+0.27%
2025	619,444	−0.03%

Population size may be affected by changes in administrative divisions. Source: Landesdatabank Nordrhein-Westfalen (1965-2025)

=== Nationality ===
According to municipal data, as of 2019, 272,982 people, or 42.6% of Düsseldorf's residents had a migration background. Around 25.5% of the population held foreign citizenship in 2024. At the end of 2023, the largest groups of foreign citizens were Turkish, Ukrainian, Greek, Polish, and Italian nationals. Among these, Turkish citizens formed the largest single group, numbering approximately 12,800 persons. Düsseldorf and its surroundings have the third-largest Japanese community in Europe and the largest in Germany (about 11,000 people). As of 2023, 6,265 Japanese nationals lived in the city proper.

Largest groups of foreign residents:
Nationality	Population (31 December 2022)
Turkey	12,707
Greece	10,388
Poland	9,316
Japan	8,329
Italy	7,799
Ukraine	7,566
Syria	5,230
Romania	4,856
Morocco	4,741
Spain	4,477

=== Religion ===
As early as 2006, 35.5% of Düsseldorf’s population did not belong to any organised religious community. At that time, the non-religious population already formed the largest group in the city, ahead of the Catholic and Protestant churches. At the end of February 2025, the Evangelical Church had 85,269 members, and at the end of 2024 the Roman Catholic Church had 147,648 members, together representing just over one-third of the city’s 658,245 inhabitants. In addition to the major Christian denominations, Düsseldorf is also home to numerous Eastern Orthodox communities and free churches.

Düsseldorf has the third-largest Jewish community in Germany—after Berlin and Munich—with around 7,000 members. The New Synagogue, located on Zietenstraße in Golzheim, was inaugurated in 1958.

Düsseldorf is home to numerous Muslim communities, which do not form a single umbrella organisation but are structured according to the national backgrounds of their members—Turkish, Bosnian, Moroccan, and other mosque associations. The largest Turkish organization, the Turkish-Islamic Union for Religious Affairs (DITIB), operates three mosques in Düsseldorf, located in Lörick, Eller, and Derendorf. According to a calculation based on census data for residents with a migration background, the proportion of Muslims in Düsseldorf was 8.3% (about 48,900 people) in 2011.

In the district of Niederkassel stands the only Jōdo Shinshū Buddhist temple in Europe, located on the grounds of the Japanese Ekō House established by the Japanese community.

== Government ==
=== Boroughs ===

Since 1975, Düsseldorf is divided into ten administrative boroughs. Each borough (Stadtbezirk) has its own elected borough council (Bezirksvertretung) and its own borough mayor (Bezirksvorsteher). The borough councils are advisory only. Each borough is further subdivided into quarters (Stadtteile). There are 50 quarters in Düsseldorf.

Borough 1 (Stadtbezirk 1) Altstadt, Carlstadt, Derendorf, Golzheim, Pempelfort, Stadtmitte Borough 2 (Stadtbezirk 2) Düsseltal, Flingern-Nord, Flingern-Süd Borough 3 (Stadtbezirk 3) Bilk, Flehe, Friedrichstadt, Hafen, Hamm, Oberbilk, Unterbilk, Volmerswerth Borough 4 (Stadtbezirk 4) Heerdt, Lörick, Niederkassel, Oberkassel Borough 5 (Stadtbezirk 5) Angermund, Kaiserswerth, Kalkum, Lohausen, Stockum, Wittlaer	Borough 6 (Stadtbezirk 6) Lichtenbroich, Mörsenbroich, Rath, Unterrath Borough 7 (Stadtbezirk 7) Gerresheim, Grafenberg, Hubbelrath, Knittkuhl, Ludenberg Borough 8 (Stadtbezirk 8) Eller, Lierenfeld, Unterbach, Vennhausen Borough 9 (Stadtbezirk 9) Benrath, Hassels, Himmelgeist, Holthausen, Itter, Reisholz, Urdenbach, Wersten Borough 10 (Stadtbezirk 10) Garath, Hellerhof

=== Mayor ===
Results of the second round of the 2025 mayoral election.

The current mayor of Düsseldorf is Stephan Keller of the Christian Democratic Union (CDU), who was elected in 2020 and reelected in 2025.

The most recent mayoral election was held on 14 September 2025, with a runoff held on 28 September, and the results were as follows:

Candidate	Party	First round		Second round	
Candidate	Party	Votes	%	Votes	%
Stephan Keller	Christian Democratic Union	106,030	43.6	120,430	60.5
Clara Gerlach	Alliance 90/The Greens	53,923	22.2	78,779	39.5
Fabian Zachel	Social Democratic Party	34,486	14.2		
Claus Henning Gahr	Alternative for Germany	24,270	10.0		
Julia Marmulla	The Left	10,951	4.5		
Ulf Montanus	Free Democratic Party	5,609	2.3		
Michael Baumeister	Free Voters Dusseldorf	2,347	1.0		
Dominique Mirus	Die PARTEI	1,988	0.8		
Berit Zalbertus	Human Environment Animal Protection Party	1,805	0.7		
Hermann Bruns	Independent	783	0.3		
Lukas Fix	Climate List Düsseldorf	716	0.3		
Alexander Marten	Independent	455	0.2		
Valid votes		243,363	97.6	199,209	99.2
Invalid votes		6,097	2.4	1,622	0.8
Total		249,460	100.0	200,831	100.0
Electorate/voter turnout		469,730	53.1	469,525	42.8
Source: State Returning Officer

=== City council ===
Results of the 2025 city council election.

The Düsseldorf city council (Düsseldorfer Stadtrat) governs the city alongside the mayor. The most recent city council election was held on 14 September 2025, and the results were as follows:

Party	Votes	%	+/-	Seats	+/-
Christian Democratic Union (CDU)	83,135	33.5	▲0.1	31	▲1
Alliance 90/The Greens (Grüne)	54,427	21.9	▼2.1	20	▼2
Social Democratic Party (SPD)	36,948	14.9	▼3	14	▼2
Alternative for Germany (AfD)	26,203	10.6	▲7.0	10	▲7
The Left (Die Linke)	15,939	6.4	▲2.4	6	▲2
Free Democratic Party (FDP)	12,243	9.2	▼4.2	5	▼3
Volt Germany (Volt)	6,128	2.5	▲0.6	2	±0
Sahra Wagenknecht Alliance (BSW)	3,983	1.6	New	1	New
Free Voters Dusseldorf (FW)	2,784	1.1	▲0.2	1	±0
Human Environment Animal Protection Party (Tierschutzpartei)	2,528	1.0	New	1	New
Die PARTEI (PARTEI)	2,381	1.0	▼0.8	1	▼1
Climate List Düsseldorf (Klimaliste)	1,227	0.5	▼0.4	0	▼1
Alexander Marten (Independent)	35	0.0	New	0	New
Sophia Henze (Independent)	26	0.0	New	0	New
Rika Bunse (Independent)	19	0.0	New	0	New
Richard Weber (Independent)	15	0.0	New	0	New
Lino Unrath (Independent)	7	0.0	New	0	New
Valid votes	248,028	99.4			
Invalid votes	1,421	0.6			
Total	249,449	100.0		92	▲2
Electorate/voter turnout	469,732	53.1	▲0.5		
Source: City of Dusseldorf

== Economy ==
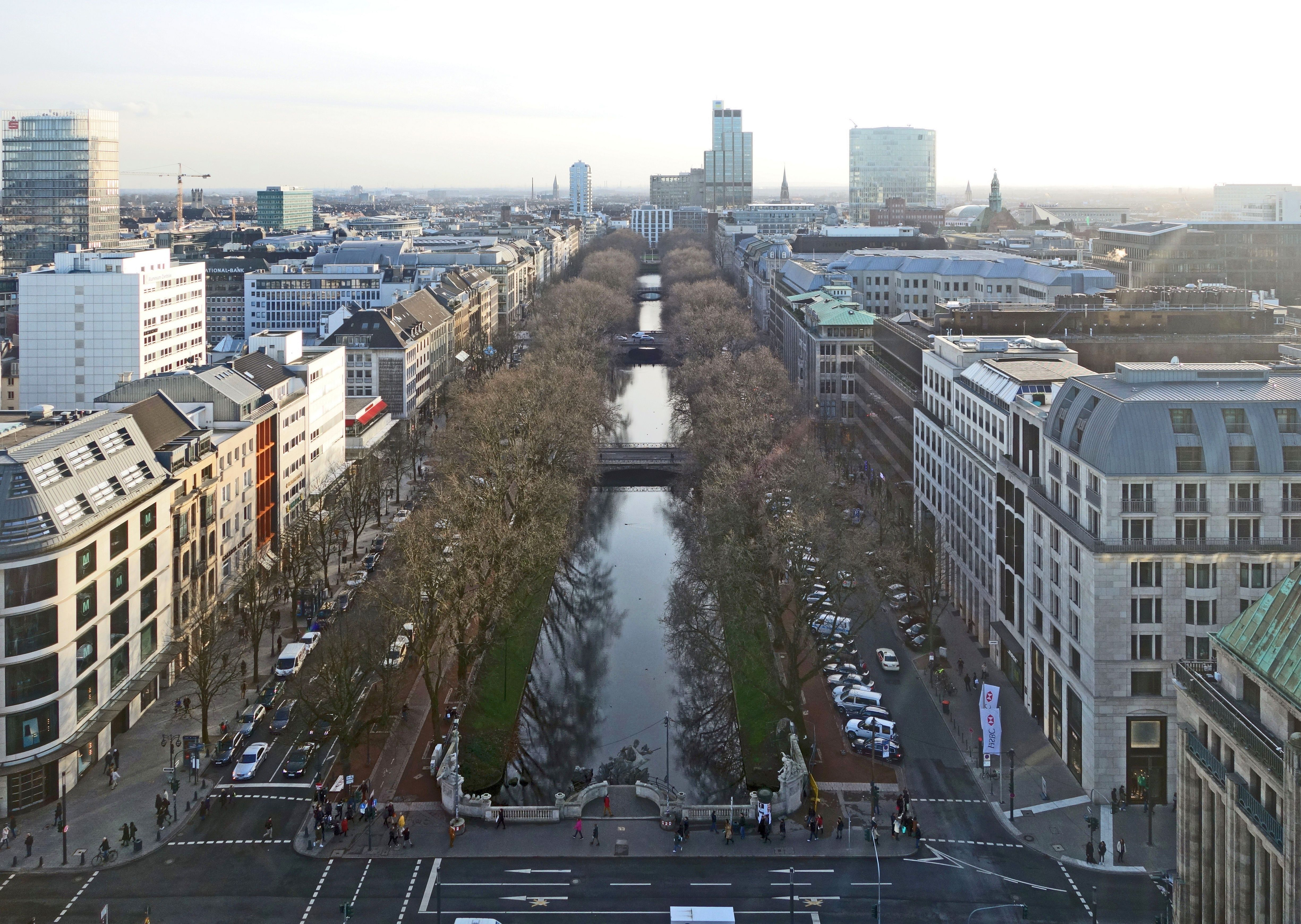
The Königsallee is a luxury shopping street in the centre of Düsseldorf.

Düsseldorf is among the leading economic centres of Germany. The city combines a strong service economy with diversified industrial activity. As of 2023, Düsseldorf’s GDP was approximately €62.7 billion, making it the 8th highest among German cities in terms of economic output. In 2024, the city’s unemployment rate averaged 7.7%.

Düsseldorf forms a joint economic region with the neighbouring district of Mettmann. It is the wealthiest economic region in North Rhine-Westphalia. As of 2023, the region had a GDP per capita of around €72,900, with the city of Düsseldorf itself reaching €93,600 per capita, while the district of Mettmann was closer to the state average at €46,300. Productivity, measured as GDP per working hour, was also significantly higher than the state average: employees in the Düsseldorf region generated about €71.3 per hour, compared with €61.2 per hour in North Rhine-Westphalia. The region’s purchasing power is the highest in North Rhine-Westphalia, both per capita and per household.

Düsseldorf has become one of the top telecommunications centres in Germany. With two of the four big German providers of mobile frequencies, D2 Vodafone and E-Plus, Düsseldorf leads the German mobile phone market. There are many foreign information and communication technology companies in Düsseldorf such as Mitsubishi, Huawei, NTT, Ericsson, Oppo, Epson, Vivo and Xiaomi. There are 18 internet service providers located in the capital of North Rhine-Westphalia. Eurowings, a low-cost carrier wholly owned by the Lufthansa Group, is headquartered in the city.

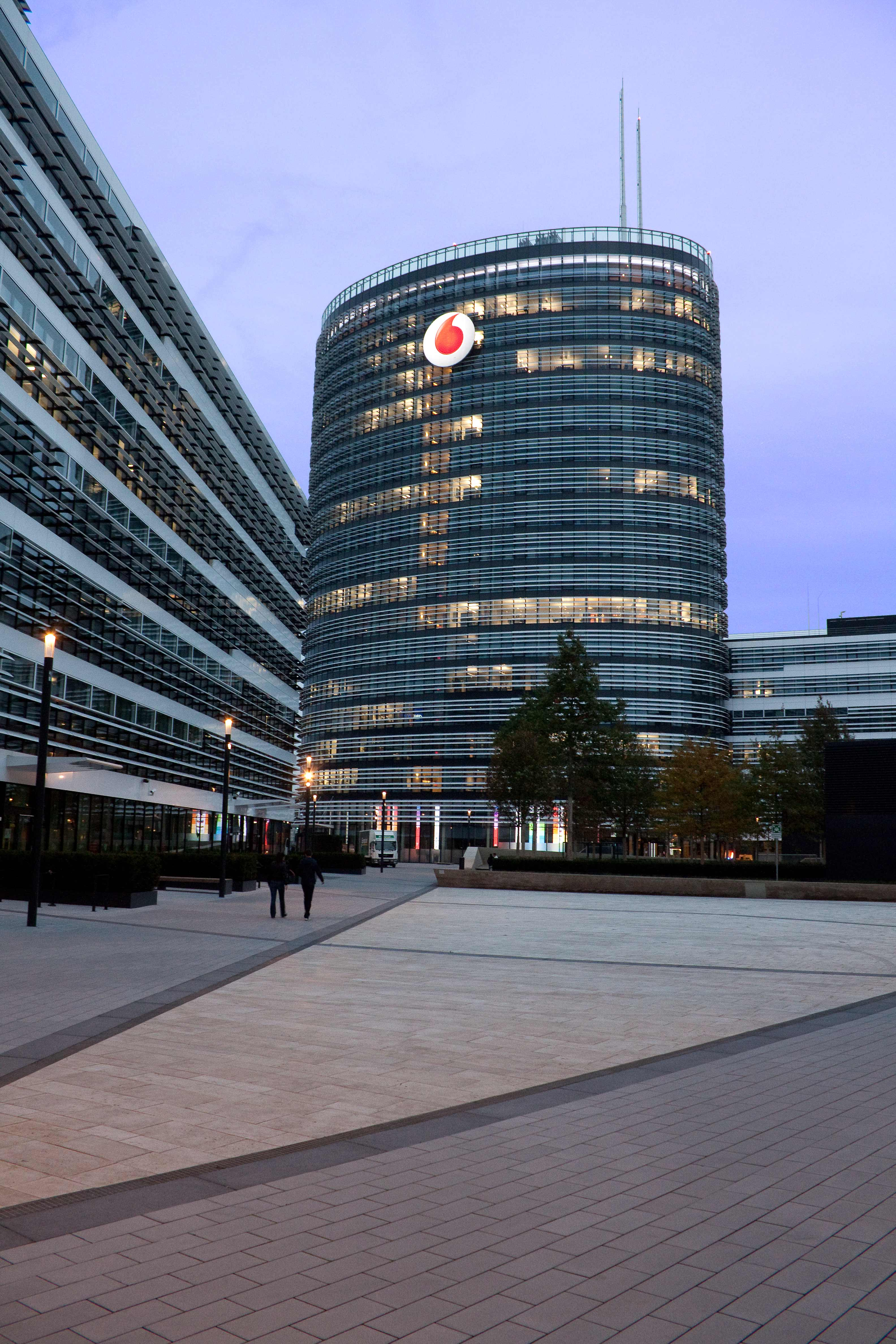
Headquarters of Vodafone Germany in Düsseldorf-Heerdt

Many of the internet companies in Düsseldorf have their roots in the world of advertising: there are 400 advertising agencies in Düsseldorf, among them four of the largest in Germany: BBDO Worldwide, Havas Worldwide, Grey Global Group and Publicis. A number of affiliates of foreign agencies deserve mention as well, such as Ogilvy & Mather, Dentsu, Hakuhodo, TBWA, and DDB. There are also about 200 publishing houses in Düsseldorf.

Businesses operating in Düsseldorf include Peek & Cloppenburg (fashion); Uniper (electricity generation); L'Oréal Germany (cosmetics and beauty); Net mobile AG (business-to-business service provider in mobile telecommunications); Henkel AG & Co. KGaA (branded consumer goods and industrial technologies); Rheinmetall (automotive and arms); Teekanne GmbH & Co. KG (tea bags and iced tea products); Metro (wholesale, retail); Ceconomy (retail); BASF personal care & nutrition (formerly Cognis – chemicals, headquarters in Monheim near Düsseldorf, but production mainly in Düsseldorf). Daimler AG builds the Mercedes-Benz Sprinter light commercial vehicles in Düsseldorf.

The "Kö", which stands for Königsallee ("King's Avenue"), is a shopping destination. Many jewellery shops, designer labels, and galleries have store locations here. The Kö has among the highest rents for retail and office space in Germany.

=== Financial centre ===
The city is an important financial center. More than 30,000 people work for the financial and insurance sector in Düsseldorf. There are around 170 national and international financial institutions, and about 130 insurance agencies, and one of Germany's eight stock exchanges. HSBC has its German headquarters in Düsseldorf and employs 3,000 people. NRW.BANK is a development bank of the State of North Rhine-Westphalia and the largest state development bank in Germany. NRW.BANK was spun off from WestLB in 2002. Today Deutsche Bank and Commerzbank have major branches in Düsseldorf with about 2,000 employees. Düsseldorf is also the most important German financial center for Japanese credit institutions. MUFG Bank, SMBC and Mizuho have offices in Düsseldorf. Also the German retail banking division of Santander (known as Santander Consumer Bank) has its headquarters in the Düsseldorf region. Some major insurance companies such as ERGO, a subsidiary of Munich Re, and ARAG are located in the city. Several other major financial service companies have their headquarters in the city.

=== Trade fairs ===
Messe Düsseldorf is a major trade fair organiser whose events attract hundreds of thousands of visitors annually and contribute substantially to the local economy. Among the best-known fairs are drupa (printing and paper technologies), boot Düsseldorf (one of the world's largest boat and water sports exhibitions), and MEDICA (medical technology).

In 2023, Messe Düsseldorf organised 27 trade shows in the city, attracting 26,866 exhibitors and 1,146,874 visitors. Of these, about 78% of exhibitors came from abroad.

=== International business ===
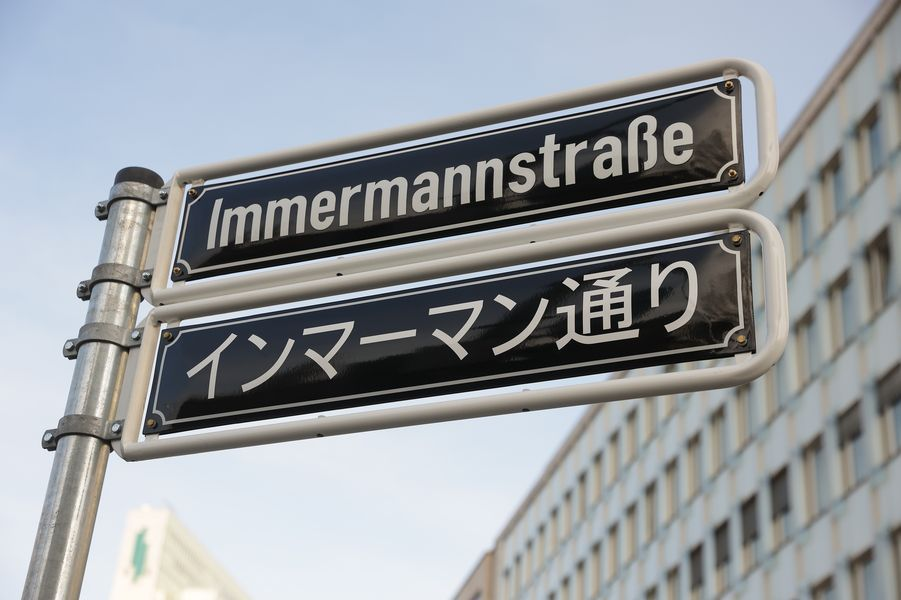
Bilingual street sign (German/Japanese) on Immermannstraße

Düsseldorf is notable for its high concentration of foreign companies. Since the 1960s, there has been a strong relationship between the city and Japan. Many Japanese banks and corporations have their European headquarters in Düsseldorf – so many that Düsseldorf has the third largest Japanese community in Europe, after London and Paris. The city also attracts multinationals from other countries: L’Oréal (France), Vodafone (United Kingdom), and Huawei (China) are examples of major international companies with a strong presence.

As of 2023, more than one in six member-companies of the Düsseldorf Chamber of Commerce and Industry had majority foreign ownership. Between 2010 and 2023, the number of foreign companies grew by 60%.

=== Media ===
Düsseldorf is home to studios of the public broadcasters Westdeutscher Rundfunk (WDR Studio Düsseldorf) and Zweites Deutsches Fernsehen (ZDF Regional Studio Düsseldorf). Programs from NRW.TV and QVC also originate from Düsseldorf. The statewide educational television channel NRWision features on its media platform TV programs about Düsseldorf or produced by TV creators from Düsseldorf.

The city is also home to the 1990-founded Verbands der Betriebsgesellschaften in Nordrhein-Westfalen e. V. (Association of Operating Companies in North Rhine-Westphalia (BGNRW)), which represents the interests of 43 operating companies in the North Rhine-Westphalian local radio sector. The private radio station Antenne Düsseldorf, which receives a framework program from Radio NRW, is located in Düsseldorf. Radio for Düsseldorf’s universities is produced by hochschulradio düsseldorf, a campus radio station with its own 24-hour frequency. StreamD has existed since 2020.

Daily newspapers published in Düsseldorf include the Westdeutsche Zeitung, Rheinische Post, a local edition of Express, and regional pages of the Neue Rhein/Neue Ruhr-Zeitung originating from Essen. Major nationwide publications based in the city include Handelsblatt and Wirtschaftswoche.

Düsseldorf is additionally the highest-revenue advertising location in Germany. Alongside major agencies such as BBDO, Grey, Ogilvy & Mather, Havas, and Publicis, numerous smaller agencies have their headquarters or a German branch office in Düsseldorf.

== Transport ==
=== Air ===
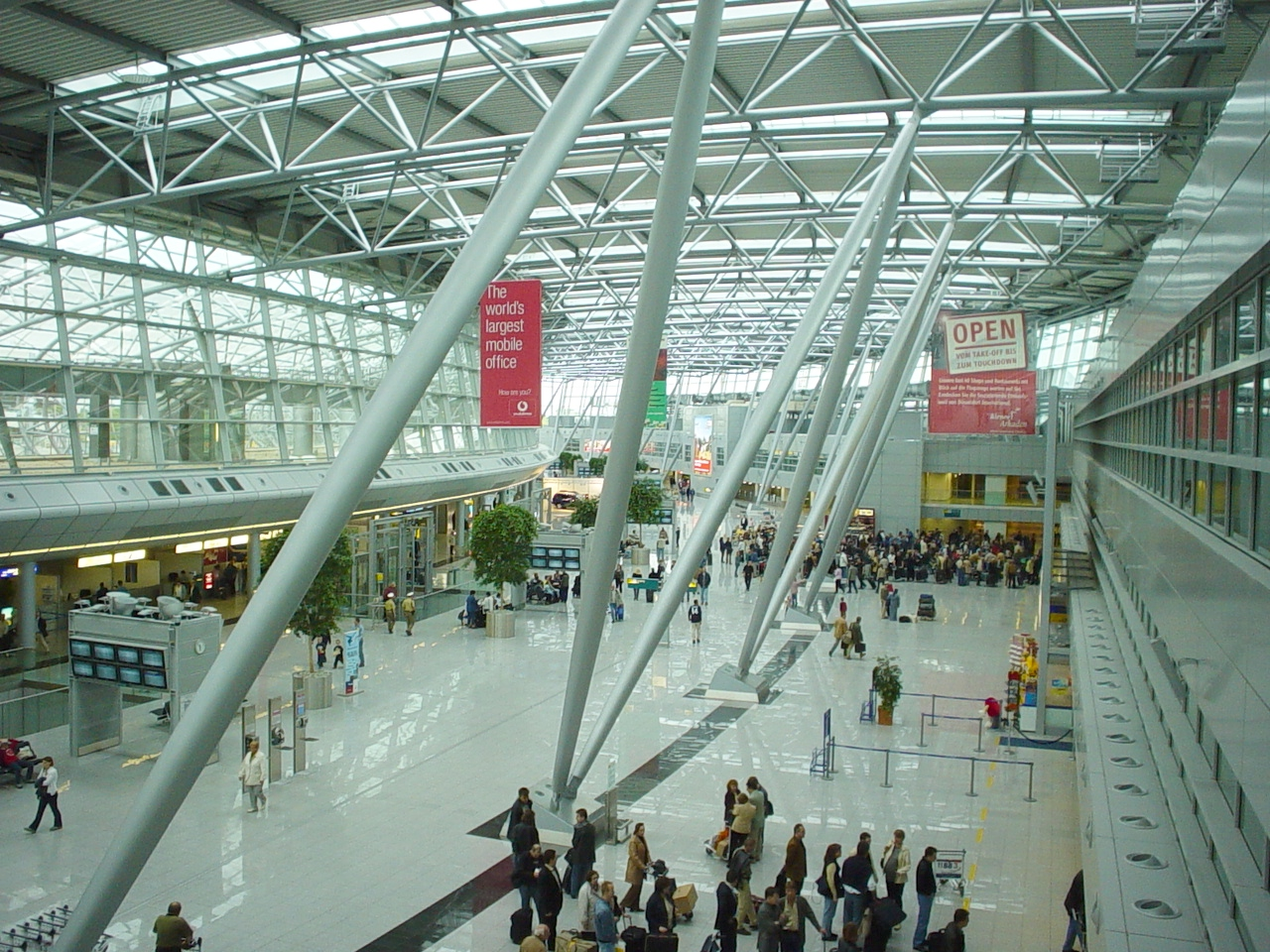
Düsseldorf Airport is Germany's fourth-busiest airport.

Düsseldorf Airport, also referred to as Rhein-Ruhr Airport, is located eight kilometres (5 miles) north of the city centre in the district of Lohausen and can easily be reached by train or the S-Bahn urban railway. There is a long-distance train station served by regional and national services, which is linked to the airport by the SkyTrain, an automatic people mover. Another station situated under the terminal building carries the S-Bahn line (S11) to Düsseldorf Central Station, and to Cologne as well as a few selected night services. In September 2026, the U80 and U81 metro lines began service between the city and the airport. The U80 runs from the central station in Düsseldorf, while the U81 runs from Arena Messe Nord.

After those of Frankfurt, Munich and Berlin, Düsseldorf Airport is Germany's fourth largest commercial airport, with 19 million passengers annually (2023).

The airport buildings were partly destroyed by a devastating fire caused by welding works in 1996, killing 17 people. Following this event, it was completely rebuilt and the Skytrain was installed.

=== Rail ===
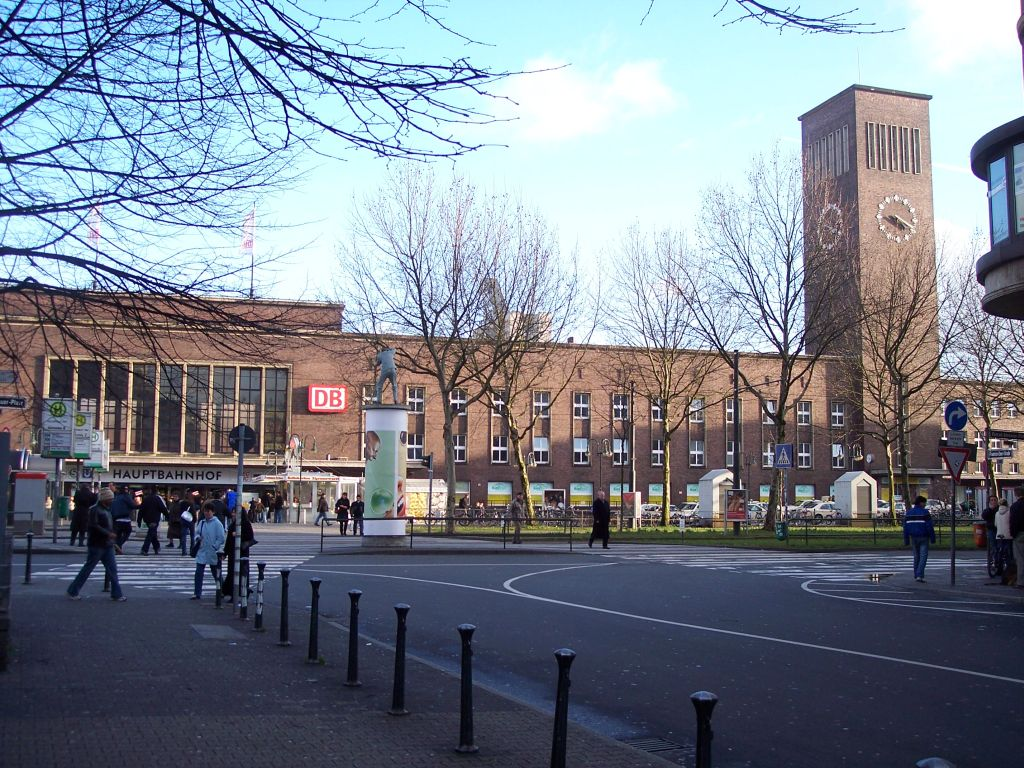
Düsseldorf Central Station

Austrian Night train passes Düsseldorf Volksgarten station

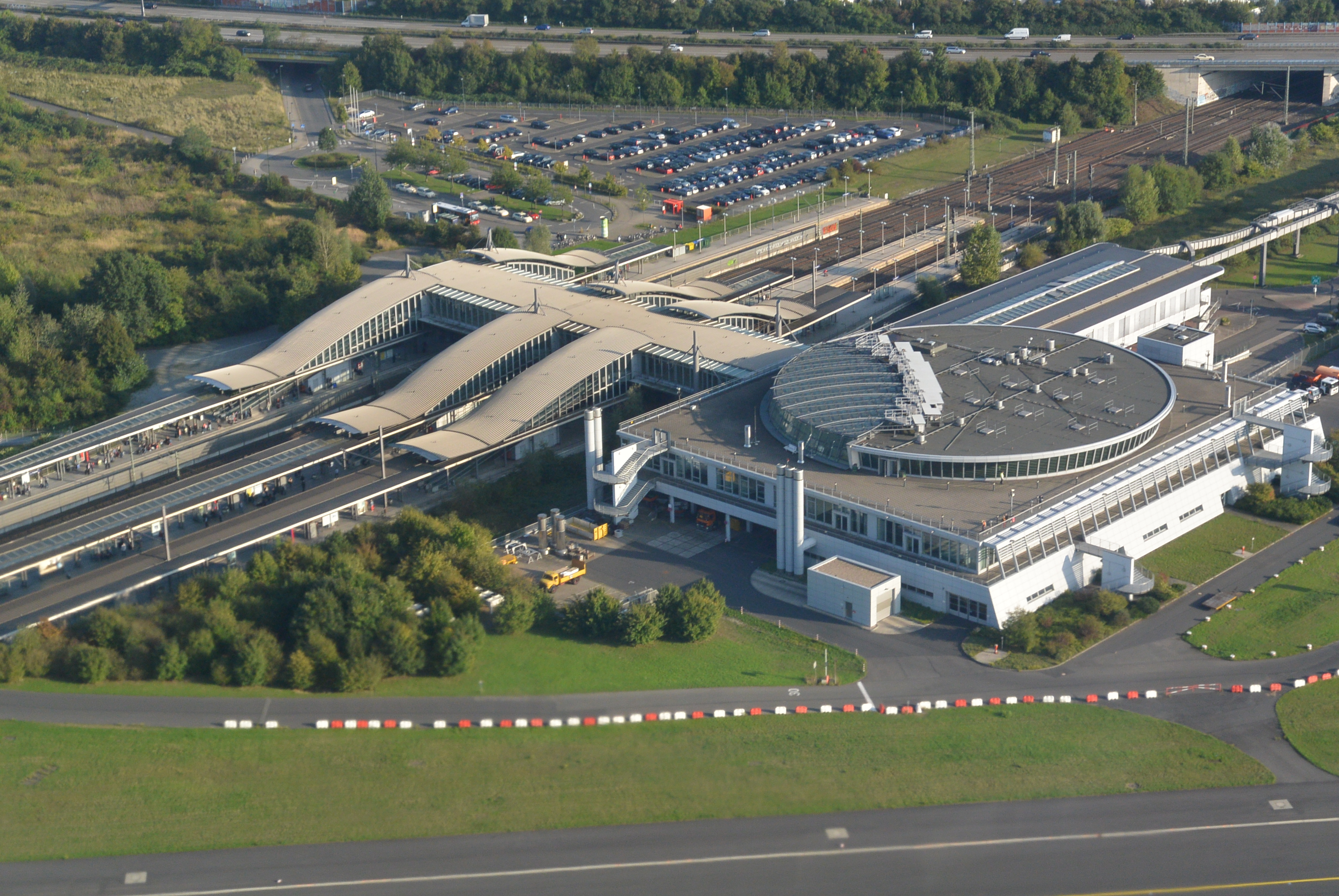
Düsseldorf Airport Station

The city is a major hub in the Deutsche Bahn (DB) railway network. More than 1,000 trains stop in Düsseldorf daily. Düsseldorf Central Station at Konrad-Adenauer-Platz is located in Düsseldorf-Stadtmitte. Several Rhein-Ruhr S-Bahn lines connect Düsseldorf to other cities of Rhine-Ruhr.

The following railway lines run through the city:

- Cologne–Duisburg (with ICE and EC/IC services)
- Mönchengladbach–Düsseldorf
- Düsseldorf–Wuppertal
- Düsseldorf–Essen (S-Bahn only)
- Düsseldorf–Solingen (S-Bahn only)
- Düsseldorf–Mettmann (S-Bahn only)
- Troisdorf–Mülheim-Speldorf (freight traffic only)

At Düsseldorf Central Station—the main long-distance station, located at its current site since 1891—these railway lines (except the freight line) are connected with each other, with the city’s light rail system, and with the rest of the public transport network.

On the Cologne–Duisburg line near the airport lies Düsseldorf Airport Station, where, in addition to trains on one S-Bahn line and all seven Regional-Express lines, some of the ICE and EC/IC trains stopping here also call. Passengers and visitors can reach the airport terminals, located about 2.5 kilometers away, via the SkyTrain. There is also a second rail connection to the airport through the underground terminus station Düsseldorf Airport Terminal, served by another S-Bahn line during the day and by extended nighttime services of several Regional-Express and additional S-Bahn lines.

Also on the Cologne–Duisburg line, but in the south of Düsseldorf, is Düsseldorf-Benrath regional station, served throughout the day by two Regional-Express lines and one S-Bahn line. Also notable is the Düsseldorf-Bilk station on the Mönchengladbach–Düsseldorf line, a heavily used transfer point between four Regional-Express lines, one Regionalbahn line, three S-Bahn lines, light-rail trains operating on the Wehrhahn Line, and bus connections to Heinrich Heine University.

Including the stations mentioned above, there are 25 S-Bahn stations within the city.

In freight rail transport, however, Düsseldorf is no longer a railway hub since the closure and demolition of its Düsseldorf-Derendorf marshalling yard. The largest freight yard in the Düsseldorf railway area is now in the neighboring city of Neuss.

=== Carsharing ===
In addition to stationary car sharing, where vehicles must be returned to their original location after use, one-way carsharing vehicles have also been available for hire since 2012. These vehicles, which can be parked anywhere where parking is normally allowed within Düsseldorf, can be rented from Car2go, Greenwheels, Stadtmobil and DriveNow.

=== Streets and highways ===
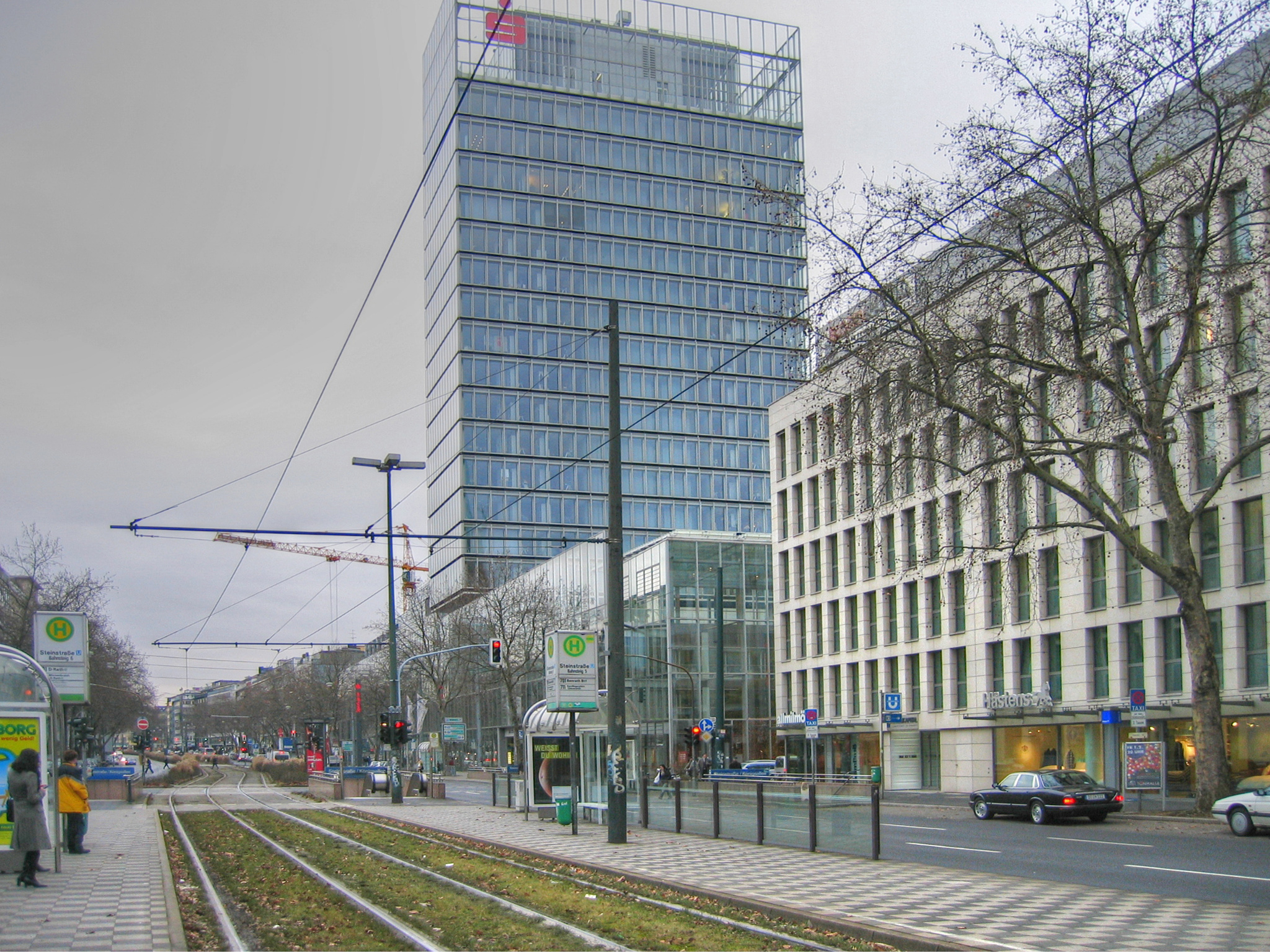
The Berliner Allee, which runs in a north–south direction, is one of Düsseldorf’s principal arterial roads.

After World War II, city traffic planning was shaped mainly by Friedrich Tamms, a proponent of the car-oriented city. In addition to projects such as the Rheinkniebrücke and the Oberkasseler Brücke, he planned a third high-capacity north–south axis between Golzheim and Wersten. The Berliner Allee and the elevated road continuing northward—nicknamed the Tausendfüßler (lit. "centipede"), demolished in April 2013 and replaced by tunnels beneath the Kö-Bogen—were central projects on this axis and were built between 1954 and 1962.

The federal highways B1 and B8 cross the city in a north–south direction, while the B7 runs east–west. The B228 connects Düsseldorf-Benrath with Hilden, Haan, and Wuppertal. Düsseldorf is unique in Germany in that three single-digit federal highways run along the same alignment. Their present course and character are the result of:

- the Theodor Heuss Bridge, completed in 1957,
- the ring-shaped roads around the city center between the North and South Cemeteries, which were expanded into the so-called Lastring,
- the new B8 between Golzheim and the Duisburg-South motorway interchange, called Danziger Straße, and
- the Rheinufer Tunnel, in operation since December 15, 1993.

Today, all federal highways in the city primarily serve urban through-traffic and traffic to and from the motorways, which outside the city area have taken over the role of federal highways in the long-distance road network. North Rhine-Westphalia has the densest network of motorways in Germany and Düsseldorf is directly accessible via the A3, A44, A46, A52, A57, A59 and A524.

=== Public local transport ===
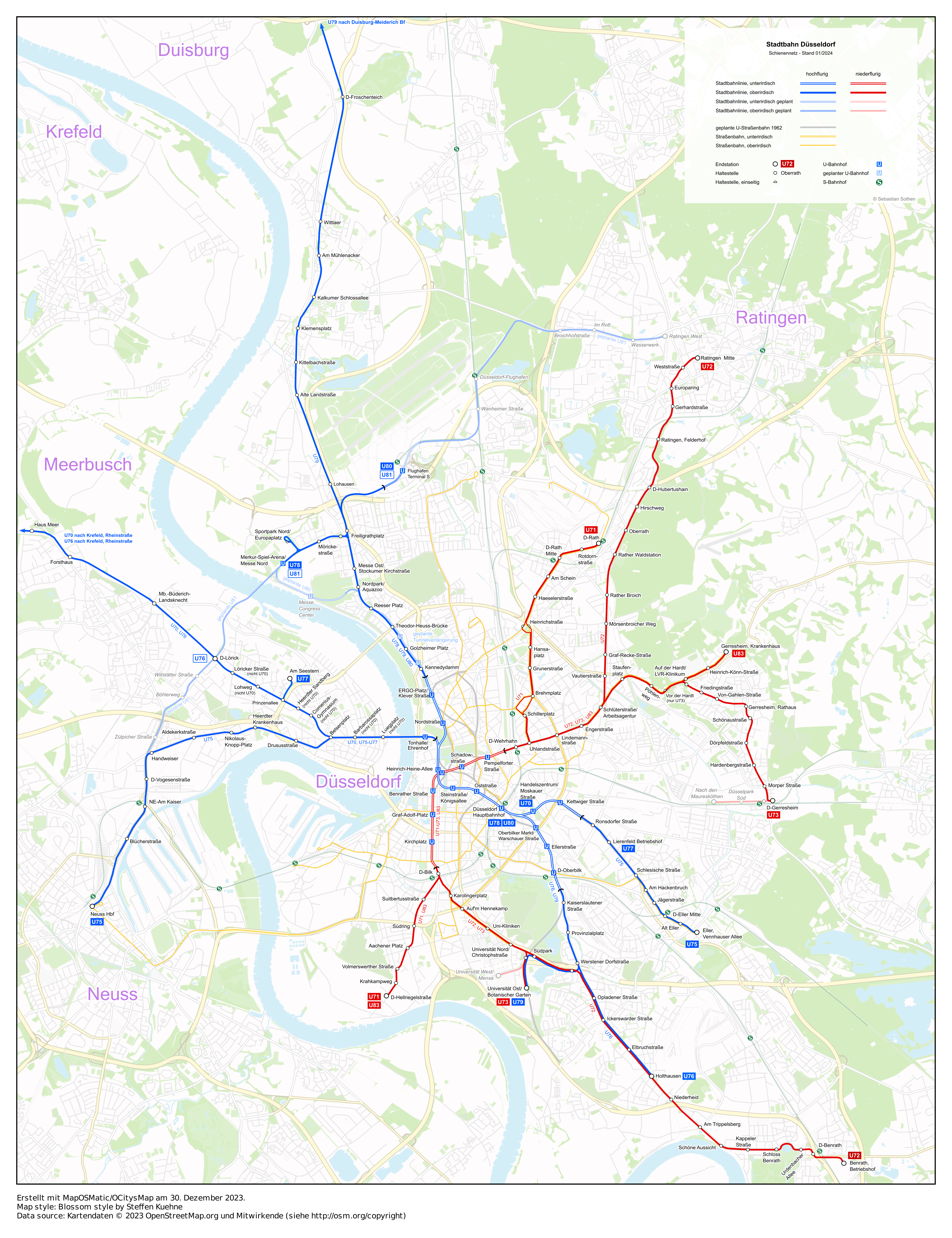
Düsseldorf tram and light rail network

Düsseldorf has a dense network of S-Bahn, light rail (Stadtbahn), tram, and city bus lines, all of which are part of the Rhine-Ruhr Transport Association (VRR). Public local transport (ÖPNV) within the city area is operated by Rheinbahn, Regiobahn, and various companies in regional rail transport. All lines can be used with VRR tickets. Beyond the VRR tariff area, the NRW tariff applies, and for journeys toward the greater Cologne area, the tariff of the Verkehrsverbund Rhein-Sieg (VRS) also applies.

A tram network was developed toward the end of the 19th century, initially using cars pulled by horses along the tracks, and from 1896 switched to electric operation. This rail network also included interurban lines to Krefeld (the K-Line) and Duisburg (the D-Line), as well as from Benrath to Solingen-Ohligs. The connections to Krefeld and Duisburg still exist today as Stadtbahn lines U70 and U76 (Krefeld), and U79 (Duisburg). Additional cross-city lines run to Neuss and Ratingen. As the light rail network expanded, the tram network decreased from 19 lines in 1981 to seven lines in 2018, with a route length of 70.2 kilometers.

The Düsseldorf light rail system currently consists of eleven lines. Seven of them run through the inner-city tunnel, opened in 1988, between the Heinrich-Heine-Allee underground station and the central station. Another tunnel route for four new light rail lines, the Wehrhahn Line, was opened on February 20, 2016. Heinrich-Heine-Allee station is the central transfer point between all light rail lines. All tunnel routes have above-ground approach tracks, only some of which have dedicated or special trackways.

Bus lines have been operating in Düsseldorf since 1924. In addition to city bus lines within the city area, regional buses provided connections to other cities, particularly after operations on some interurban tram lines were discontinued. In the meantime, Rheinbahn has discontinued its line to Jülich and shortened other lines to Essen, Velbert, Solingen, Leichlingen, Opladen, and Moers. Today, connections still exist to Mülheim an der Ruhr, Mettmann, Erkrath, Solingen-Ohligs, Langenfeld, and Monheim; express buses now also run to Haan. Today, 42 city bus lines and seven express bus lines operate within the city. Buses are also an essential component of night service on Friday/Saturday nights, Saturday/Sunday nights, and nights before public holidays. Eight NightExpress lines operate between midnight and 5:00 a.m. at 30- or 60-minute intervals. Metrobus service on three lines began on August 20, 2018.

=== Cycling and pedestrian traffic ===
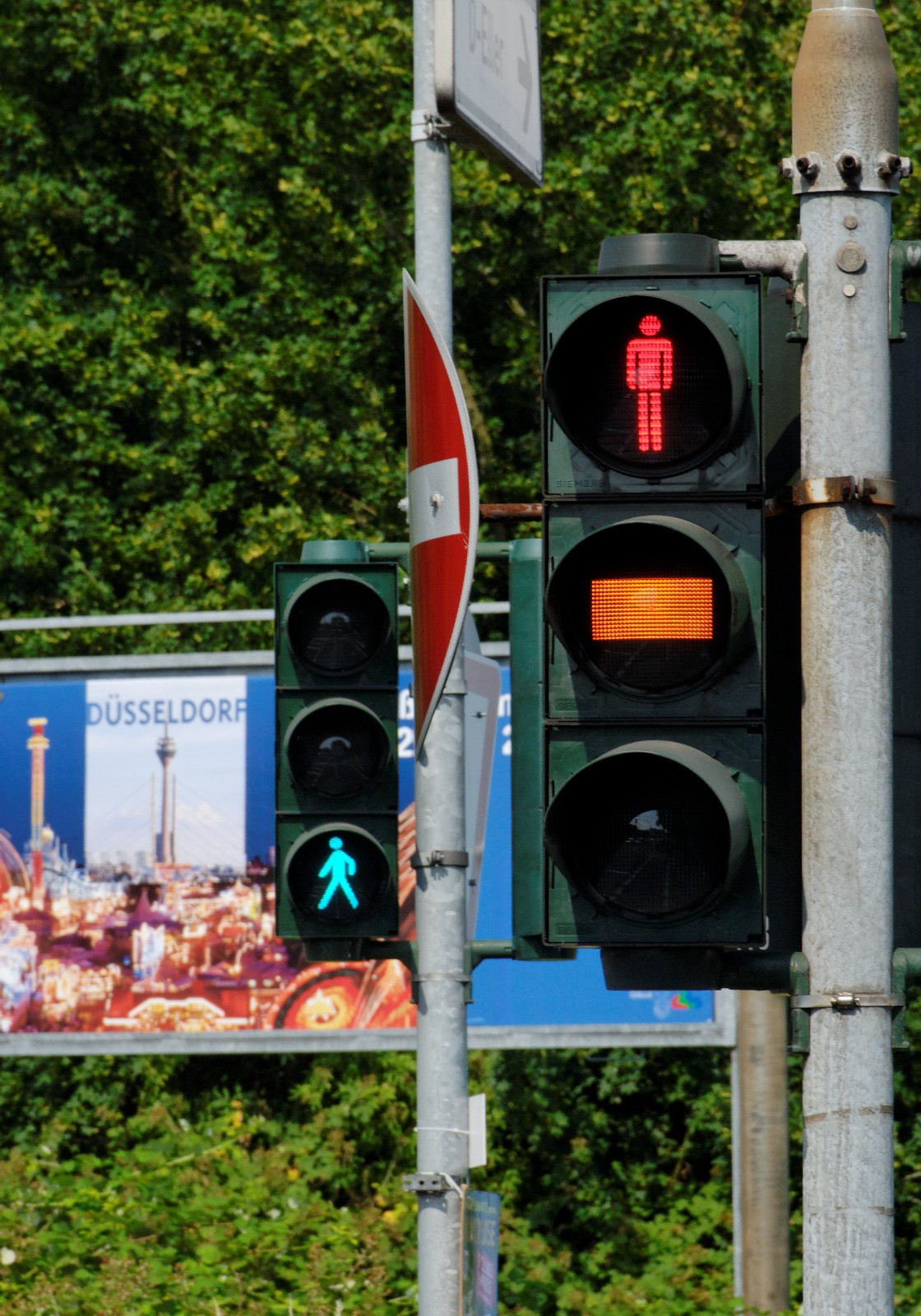
Pedestrian crossing lights in Düsseldorf-Hassels

Düsseldorf is connected to several national and international long-distance cycling routes, including the Rhine Cycle Route. The city is a member of Arbeitsgemeinschaft fußgänger- und fahrradfreundlicher Städte, Gemeinden und Kreise in Nordrhein-Westfalen (Working Group of Pedestrian- and Bicycle-Friendly Cities, Municipalities, and Districts in North Rhine-Westphalia).

Since 2008, Düsseldorf’s city centre has had a bicycle-sharing system with a network structure that is also suitable for one-way trips. The operator is the company nextbike. Pedelecs can be rented at the bicycle station at the main train station. Since 2020, rental bicycles of Deutsche Bahn (Call a Bike) may no longer be parked in public street space in Düsseldorf, such as on sidewalks. The City of Düsseldorf issued an administrative order requiring the operator to remove the entire fleet from public spaces and to refrain from parking the bicycles there in the future.

Düsseldorf is the only city in Germany whose pedestrian traffic lights have a separate yellow phase. Here, the yellow signal is indicated by a rectangular yellow bar. During this time, pedestrians have the opportunity to clear the intersection without having to walk against a red signal, as they would in other cities. Immediately after the pedestrian signal switches from yellow to red, the green phase for cross traffic begins. Before the green phase for pedestrians, there is also a short red-yellow phase lasting less than one second.

=== Shipping traffic and ports ===
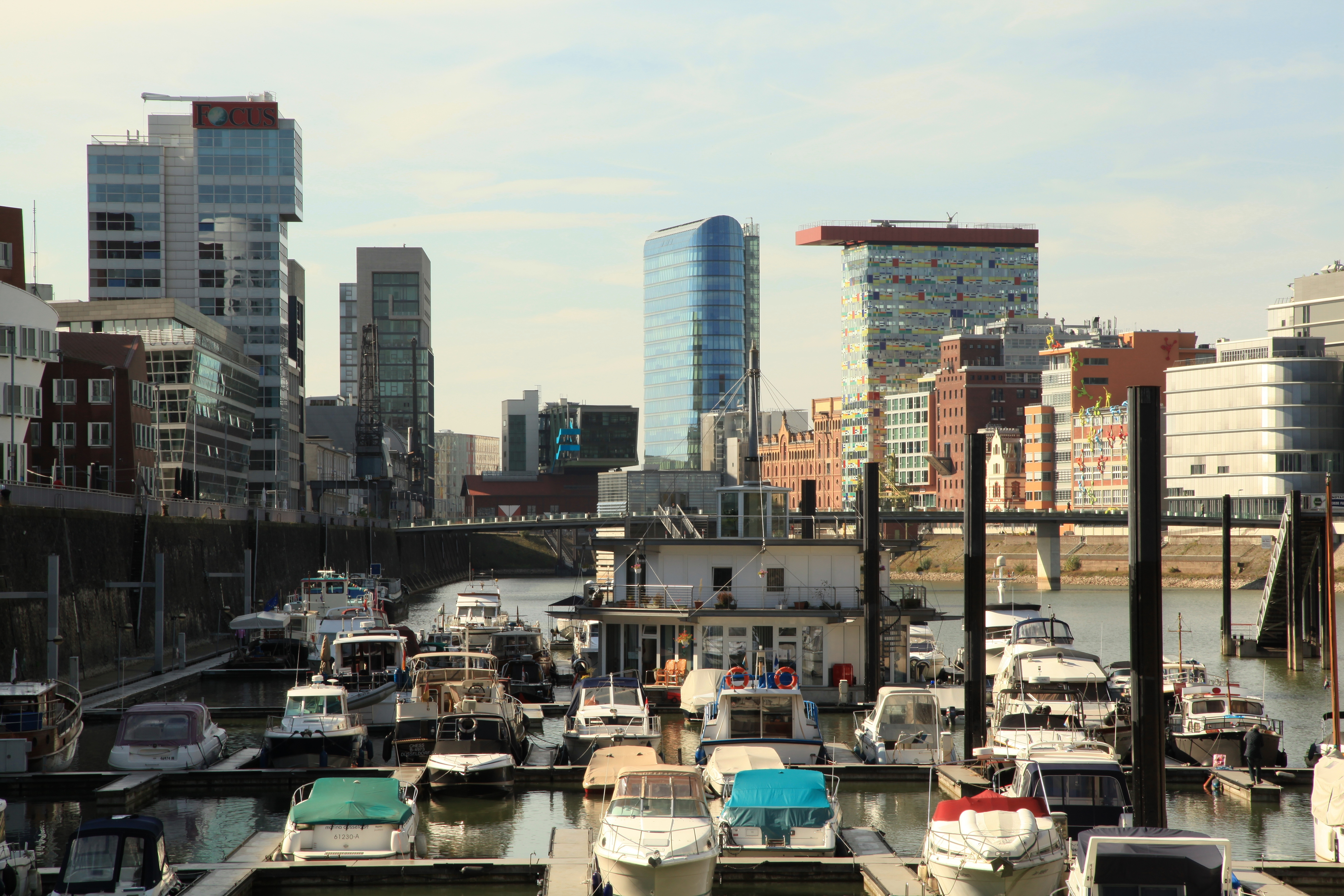
Düsseldorf Marina with the Media Harbour in the background

With the centrally located harbour in the district of the same name and the Reisholz harbour — whose expansion has been planned for a long time — two transshipment points for goods are available to Rhine shipping within the city area. Through the Rhine, the connected canals, and the Main–Danube Canal, Düsseldorf is extensively linked to the European inland waterway network — including the Ems, Weser, Elbe, Oder, and Danube — as well as to major seaports on the North Sea and the Black Sea. There is a sports and yacht harbour at Rheinpark Golzheim.

Between the Old Town and Kaiserswerth, passenger ships of the Weisse Flotte Düsseldorf operate regularly; before 1993, they were operated by Rheinbahn. Köln-Düsseldorfer Rheinschifffahrts AG (KD) also has landing stages within the city area. With the Langst–Kaiserswerth Rhine ferry and the ferry between Urdenbach and Zons, two car ferries are still in service. A third car ferry operated between Himmelgeist and Uedesheim until the opening of the Flehe Bridge in 1979. Today, on Sundays in good weather, a passenger ferry with bicycle transport operates there. For several years now, passenger ferries have also operated between the Rheinkirmes fairgrounds and the Old Town.

== Culture ==
Düsseldorf is one of Germany’s arts and culture hubs. Elector Jan Wellem and his wife Anna Maria Luisa de' Medici of Tuscany, were patrons of Düsseldorf's first significant cultural activities in the 17th and 18th centuries. In addition to the large North Rhine-Westphalia Art Collection and other museums and galleries, the city is home to the renowned Düsseldorf Art Academy, which produced the Düsseldorf School of Painting in the 19th century and the Düsseldorf School of Photography in the 20th century. Well-known stages such as the Schauspielhaus and the Kom(m)ödchen are represented in the city. Moreover, several of Germany’s popular musicians and poets were born in Düsseldorf or made the city their home. Heinrich Heine; Clara and Robert Schumann; Felix Mendelssohn, and Joseph Beuys are among the most prominent artists related to the city.

=== Museums and galleries ===
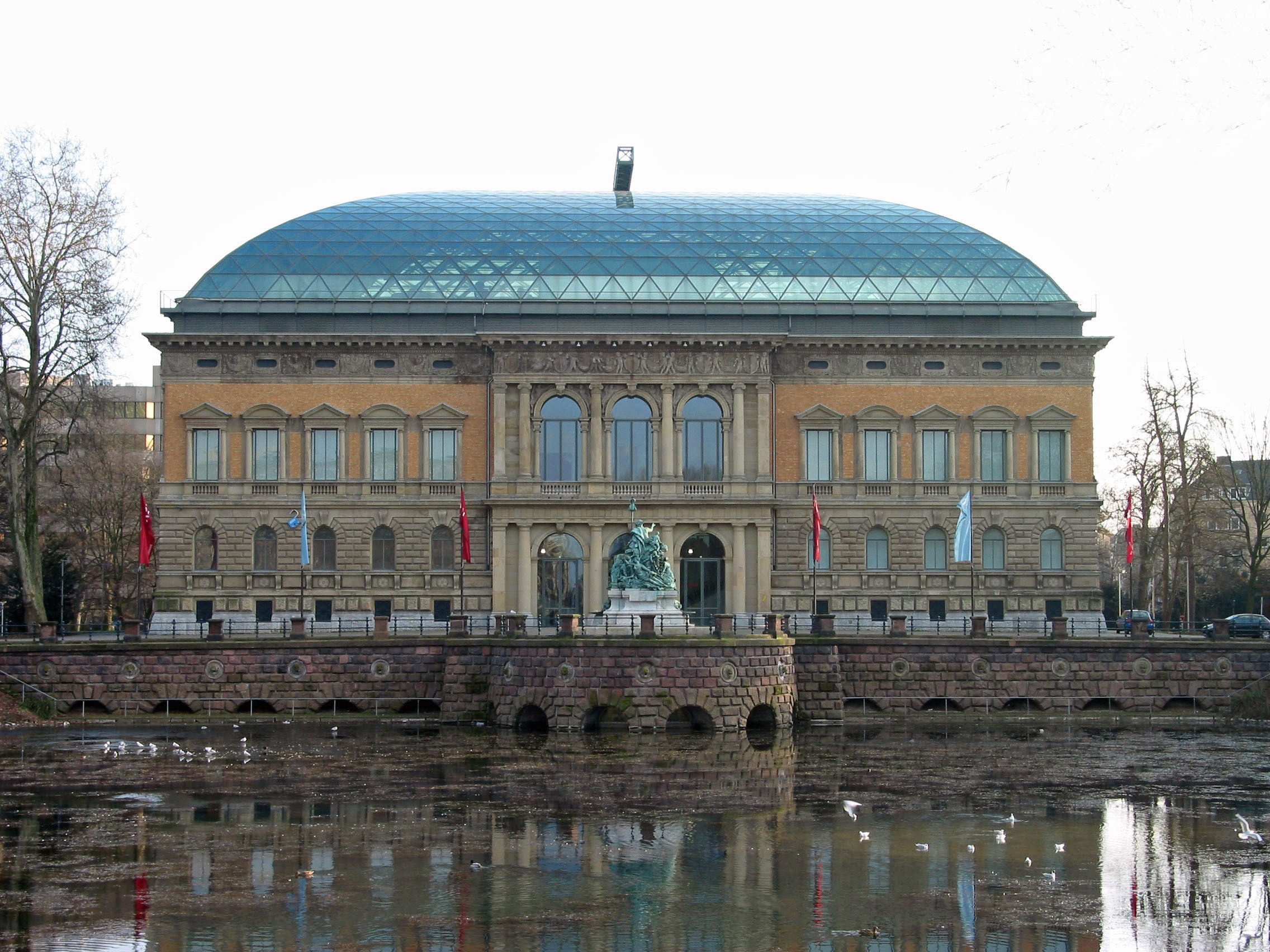
Kunstsammlung Nordrhein-Westfalen – K21 (Ständehaus)

Düsseldorf is a centre for visual arts, with a long tradition rooted in the Kunstakademie Düsseldorf (Düsseldorf Art Academy), an institution that has shaped several major European art movements, such as the Düsseldorf School of Painting in the 19th century. During the post-war period the academy became internationally influential through the Düsseldorf School of Photography, associated with figures such as Bernd and Hilla Becher, Andreas Gursky, Thomas Struth, and Candida Höfer.

The city hosts numerous museums and galleries covering a broad range of artistic disciplines. The Kunstsammlung Nordrhein-Westfalen (K20 and K21) displays an extensive collection of modern and contemporary art, including works by Pablo Picasso, Paul Klee, Gerhard Richter, and Joseph Beuys. The Museum Kunstpalast, located near the Rhine, houses artworks from the medieval period to the present day and is known for its collection of Baroque painting and glass art. Several smaller institutions contribute to Düsseldorf’s cultural landscape, including the NRW Forum, which focuses on photography, design, and digital culture, and the Kunst im Tunnel (KIT), which exhibits contemporary art in a tunnel space beneath the Rhine promenade. The Hetjens-Museum, dedicated to ceramics, and the Goethe-Museum, located in Schloss Jägerhof, further reflect the city’s diverse museum scene.

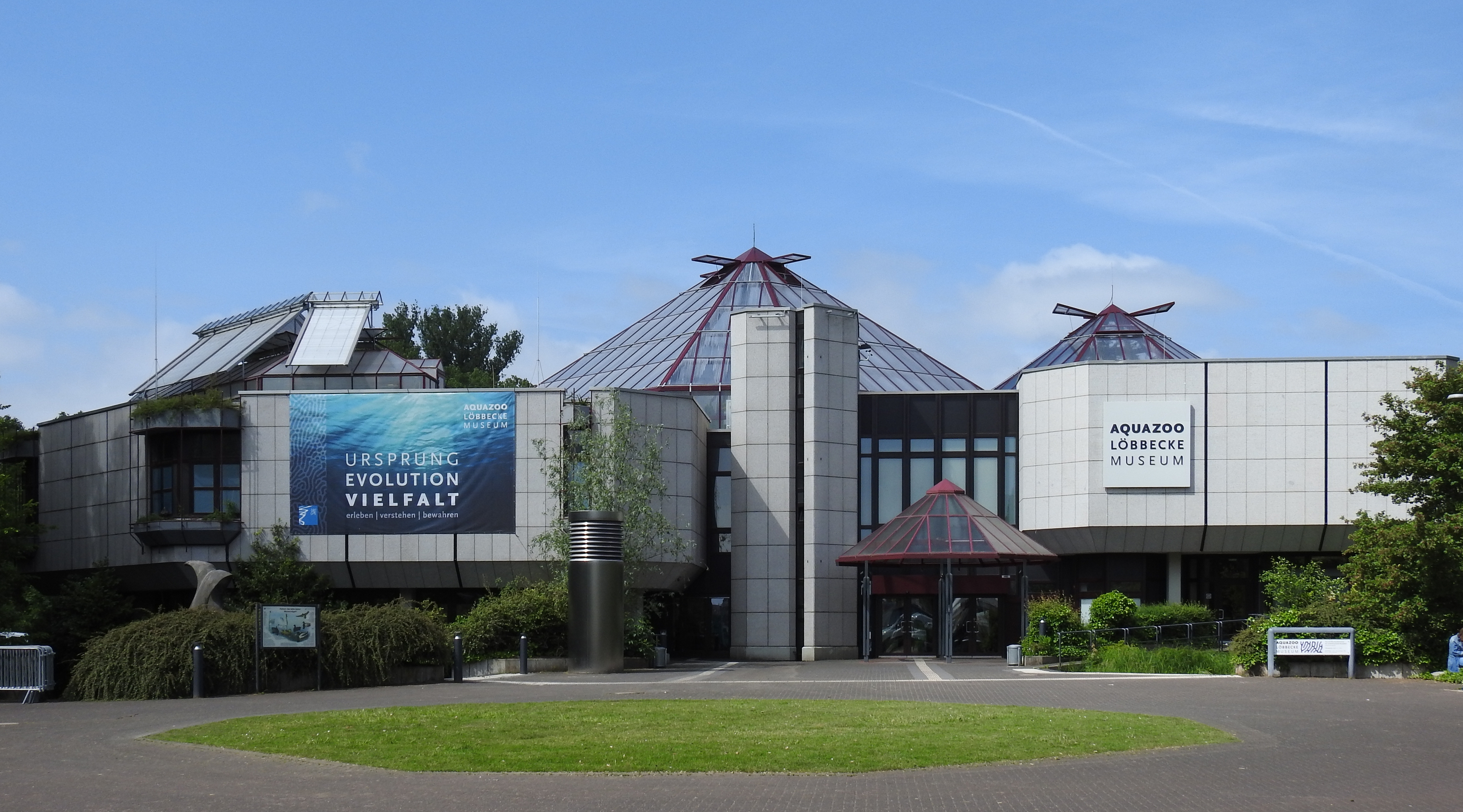
Aquazoo Löbbecke Museum

In addition to visual arts, Düsseldorf maintains a variety of museums that cover science, history, and regional culture. The Filmmuseum Düsseldorf showcases the history of film and cinema technology, including equipment and screenings of classic films. The Aquazoo Löbbecke Museum combines zoological exhibits with natural history, featuring local and exotic animal species alongside ecological and environmental displays. The Stadtmuseum Düsseldorf provides an overview of the city's history and culture, displaying artifacts ranging from prehistory to contemporary times. The Haus der Geschichte Nordrhein-Westfalen presents the history and development of North Rhine-Westphalia, highlighting themes such as democracy, diversity, and societal change. Additionally, the Schifffahrtsmuseum documents the city’s maritime history and its development as a major Rhine port.

=== Performing arts ===
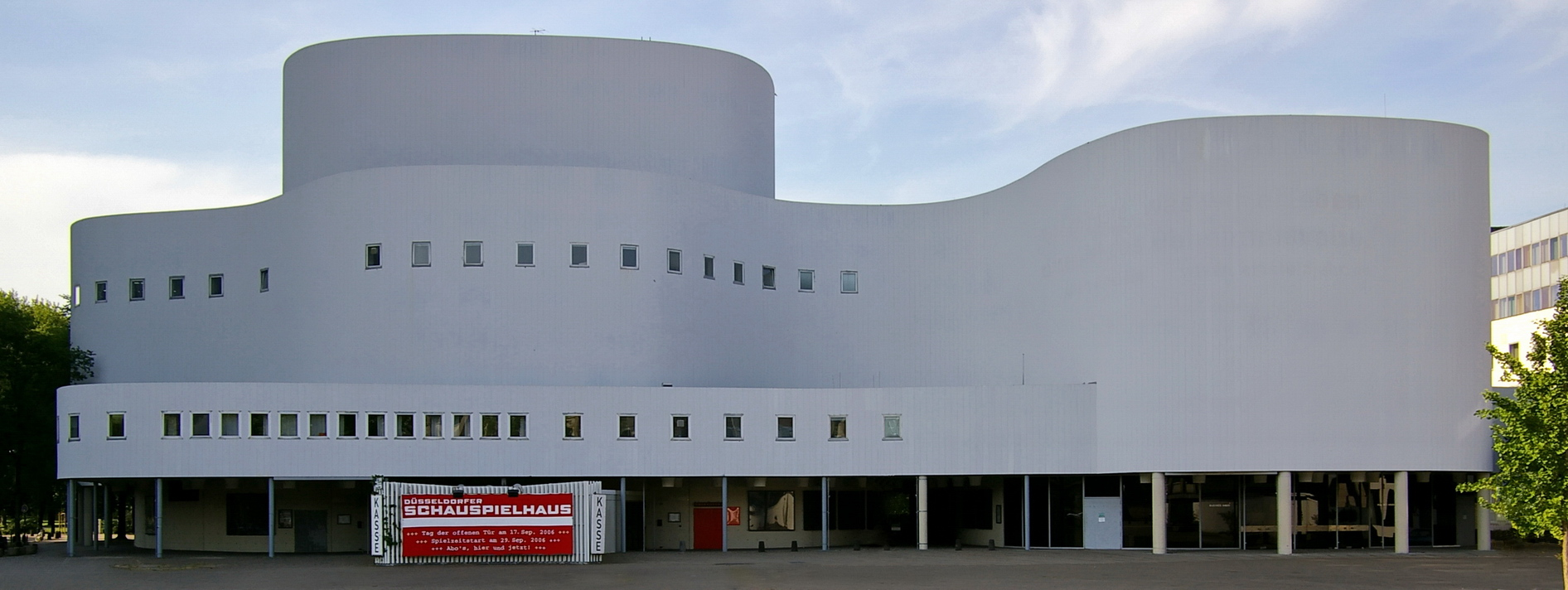
Düsseldorf Schauspielhaus

Düsseldorf has a theatre tradition that can be traced back to the 16th century. The earliest theatrical events are dated to the year 1585. The present Düsseldorfer Schauspielhaus, with its modern curved architecture, was completed in 1970 and is the city's largest theatre. It is located on Gustaf-Gründgens-Platz, named after the former artistic director.

Other major theatres in the North Rhine-Westphalian metropolis include the Forum Freies Theater, which presents performing arts; the Komödie Düsseldorf, a classic boulevard theatre; the Theater an der Kö, which primarily offers comedies and modern plays and is run by the well-known Heinersdorff theatre family; the Theater an der Luegallee in Oberkassel; the KaBARett FLiN in Grafenberg; and the Savoy Theatre.

For children, the Theateratelier Takelgarn—with comedy, cabaret, puppetry, and children’s theatre—is particularly appealing. The Puppet Theatre on Helmholtzstraße, as well as the Düsseldorf Marionette Theatre, caters to both children and adults. The latter was founded in 1956 and is located in Palais Wittgenstein, which also houses various other cultural projects.

==== Opera, musical theatre, and variety ====
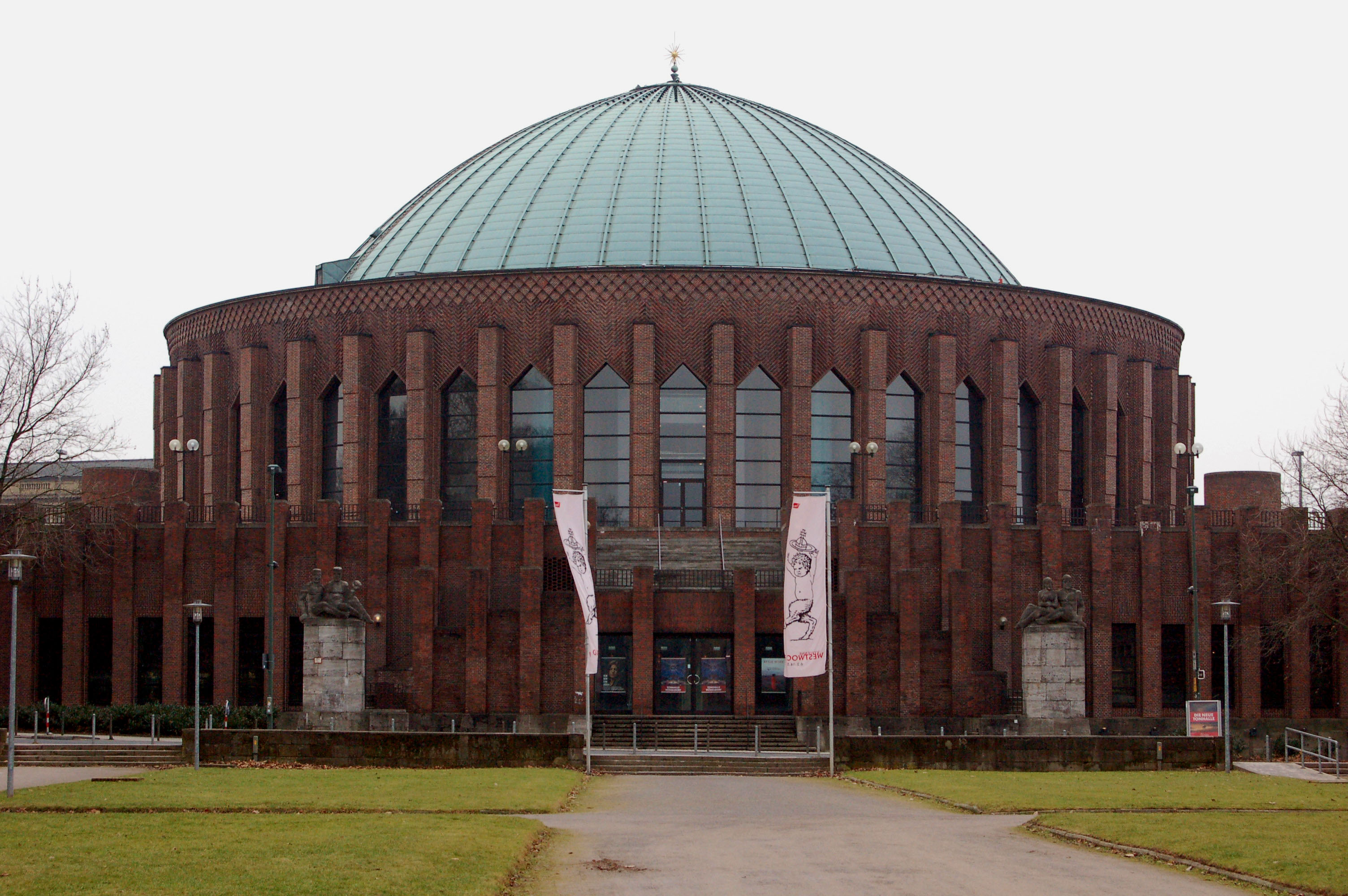
Düsseldorf Tonhalle

The Deutsche Oper am Rhein also has a very long tradition. At its two venues in Düsseldorf and Duisburg, it presents opera, operetta, and ballet.

The Apollo Varieté, located beneath the Rheinknie Bridge on the Carlstadt riverbank, offers classic variety theatre in the style of the early 20th century.

The Tonhalle Düsseldorf, built in 1925 as a planetarium, is a venue for concerts and other musical events spanning classical music, jazz, pop, and cabaret.

The Capitol Theater is the largest theatre in the state capital and hosts changing productions of musicals and live entertainment.

==== Cabaret ====
The Kom(m)ödchen is the oldest cabaret stage in Germany still in existence. It was founded in 1946 by Kay and Lore Lorentz. Many cabaret artists who later became prominent first proved themselves here.

==== Tanzhaus NRW ====
Tanzhaus NRW (stylized as tanzhaus nrw) in Düsseldorf is an institution for dance founded in 1998. It offers stage performances, professional dance training, the development of productions within the framework of choreographer residencies, as well as a wide range of educational opportunities through courses and workshops under one roof.

=== Music ===
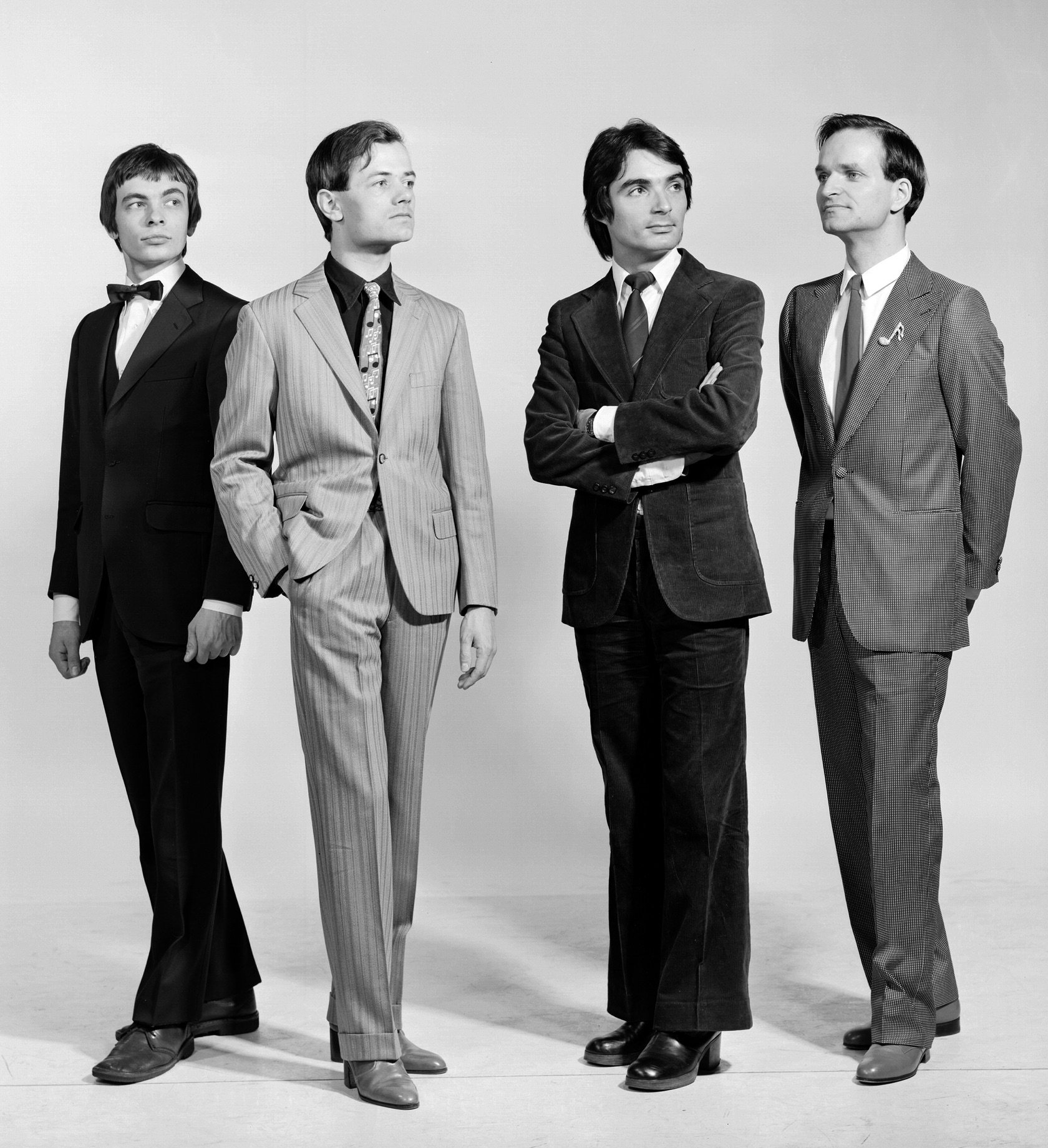
Kraftwerk, a pioneering electronic music band from Düsseldorf

Düsseldorf has been home to a number of influential music artists and bands, particularly in the electronic and krautrock genres, with Kraftwerk being the most prominent example. As one source describes, "This is the place where Neu! conceived the motorik beat, Harmonia dreamed up ambient, Die Krupps expanded the idea of industrial, and where those brilliant mensch-maschines Kraftwerk, declared: 'We are the robots'."

The city's best-known contribution to the culture of modern popular music is the influential avant-garde electronic band Kraftwerk. Formed by two Düsseldorf-born musicians, Kraftwerk is internationally known as the most significant band in the history of post-war German music and as pioneers in electronic music.

Other influential musical groups originating from Düsseldorf include Neu!, formed in 1971 by Klaus Dinger and Michael Rother, after their split from Kraftwerk, and La Düsseldorf, also formed by Dinger in 1976 shortly after Neu! disbanded. Both groups had a significant influence on a variety of subsequent rock, post-punk, and electronic music artists.

Internationally known power metal band Warlock was formed in Düsseldorf in 1982. Its frontwoman, Doro Pesch, has had a successful solo career in Europe and Asia since Warlock ended. The punk band Die Toten Hosen, the electronic act D.A.F., as well as the electronic/industrial pioneers Die Krupps, all originated in Düsseldorf.

Düsseldorf appears in several songs, including Düsseldorf by the British indie band Teleman and Wärst du doch in Düsseldorf geblieben by Danish singer Dorthe Kollo.

The city hosted the Eurovision Song Contest 2011.

=== Literature ===
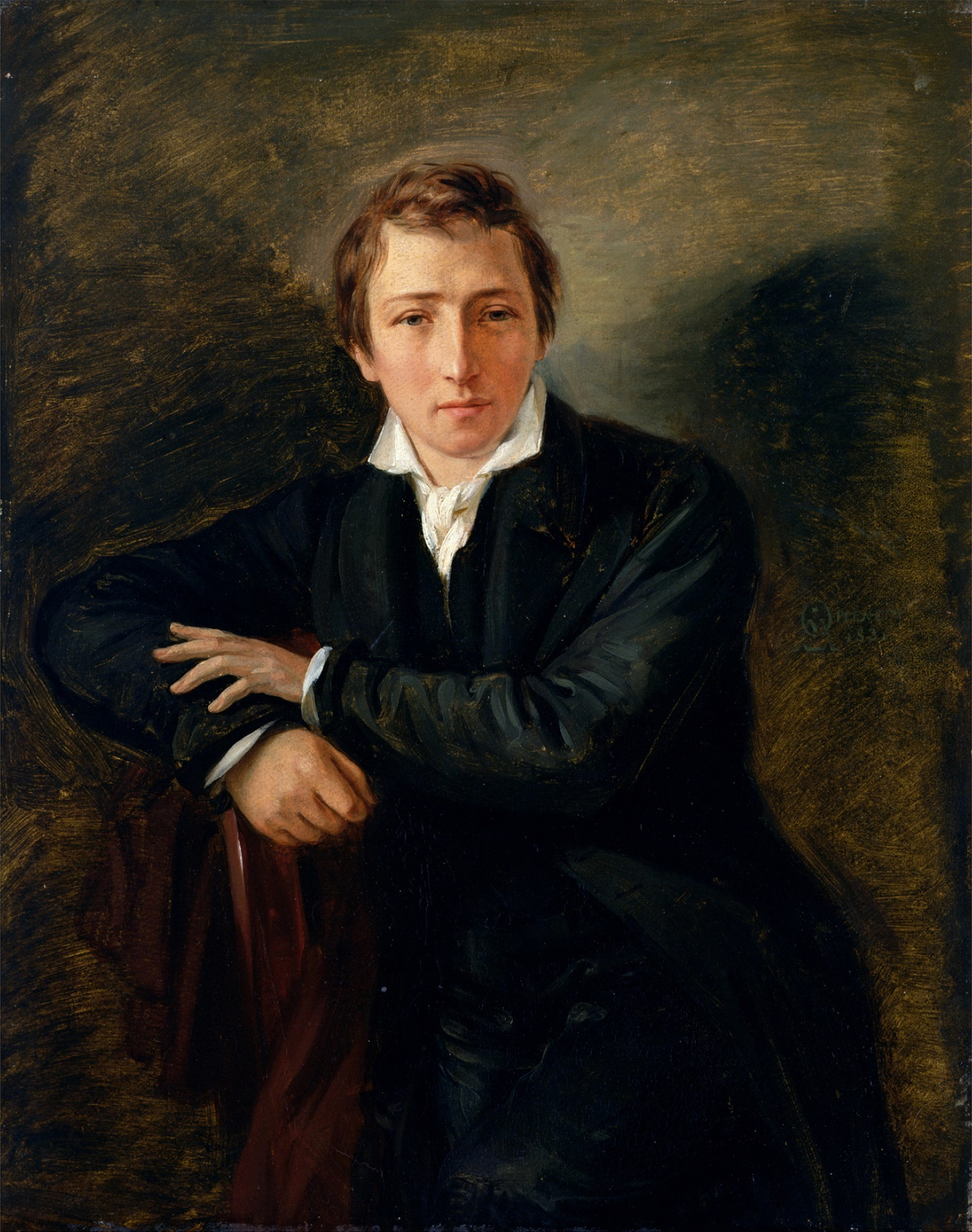
The romantic poet Heinrich Heine was born in Düsseldorf in 1797.

Düsseldorf has a long literary tradition that reflects its role as a cultural centre of the Rhineland. The city is associated with the Romantic poet Heinrich Heine, who was born in Düsseldorf in 1797 and spent his childhood there. The Heinrich Heine Institute preserves his manuscripts and correspondence, and also functions as a research centre and museum dedicated to 19th- and 20th-century German literature.

Contemporary literary life in the city is supported by the Literaturbüro NRW, which organises readings, workshops and projects to promote authors and literary education across Düsseldorf and North Rhine-Westphalia. The annual Literaturtage Düsseldorf (Düsseldorf Literature Days) presents a programme of readings and events at venues across the city. In addition, the Central Library Düsseldorf regularly hosts author readings and cultural programmes, strengthening the city's reputation as a hub for literary exchange.

The Förderpreis für Literatur der Landeshauptstadt Düsseldorf is a German literary award established by the City of Düsseldorf. The award has been presented annually since 1972 by the City Council.

=== Fashion ===
Düsseldorf has been the fashion capital of Germany for decades; it is also a major cultural centre for the art scene. Berlin, Germany's 'fashion capital' until 1945, lost its position because of its special location within the Soviet occupation zone. After the monetary reform of 20 June 1948, fashionable clothes trends gained importance. Igedo organised fashion shows staged in Düsseldorf starting in March 1949. There are a number of schools dedicated to fashion design in Düsseldorf, among them Akademie Mode & Design (de), Design Department, and Mode Design College.

=== Carnival ===
One of the biggest cultural events in Düsseldorf is the Karneval (also referred to as the "fifth season") which starts every year on 11 November at 11:11 a.m., and reaches its climax on Rosenmontag (Rose Monday), featuring a huge parade through the streets of Düsseldorf. Karneval ends on Aschermittwoch (Ash Wednesday).

=== Düsseldorf's cartwheeler ===
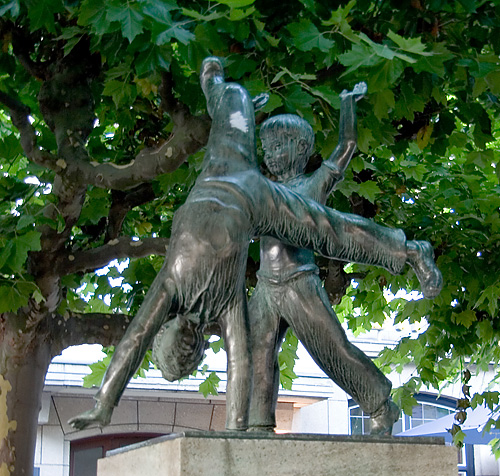
Cartwheeler's Fountain on Burgplatz

Düsseldorf's cartwheeler (Düsseldorfer Radschläger) is said to be the city's oldest tradition. There are different theories about its origin. The cartwheeler symbol appears on souvenirs, and many things in Düsseldorf owe their names to the cartwheeler.

Cartwheelers can be found at several fountains within the city and near many small landmarks. The most famous is Cartwheeler's Fountain on Burgplatz (de). The fountain was designed by Alfred Zschorsch in 1954 and donated by Heimatverein Düsseldorfer Jonges, which is a club devoted to the maintenance of local and regional traditions. Other cartwheelers can be found decorating storm drains and the door knocker of the Church of Lambertus, designed by Friedrich Becker. Becker also created the cartwheeler in front of the Schadow Arcades.

The tradition has been kept alive by the Alde Düsseldorfer Bürgergesellschaft von 1920 e. V., a society founded in 1920, which organised the first cartwheeler competition on 17 October 1937. This event has been held annually since 1971. Formerly held on Königsallee, since 2006 it has taken place on the Rheinwerft, near the Old Town. In an art project Radschläger-Kunst (Cartwheeler Art) launched in 2001, over 100 cartwheeler sculptures were designed by various artists. They were positioned around the city centre. Some of the sculptures have been auctioned off to companies and private owners.

=== Cuisine ===
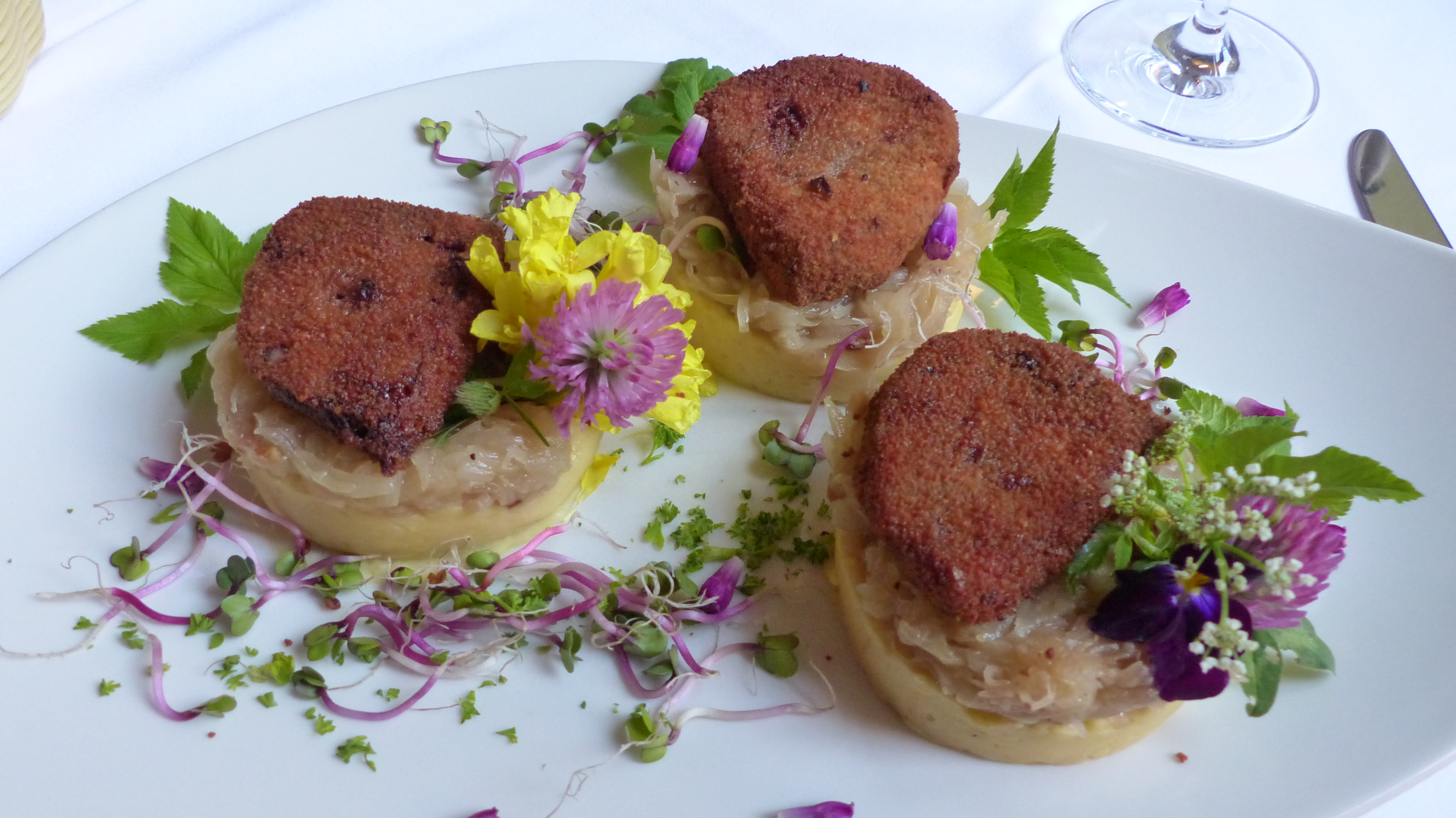
Himmel un Äd, "Heaven and Earth"

Traditional meals in the region are Rheinischer Sauerbraten (a beef roast and sometimes horse marinated for a few days in vinegar and spices served with gravy and raisins) and Heaven and Earth (Himmel und Äd; black pudding with stewed apples mixed with mashed potatoes). In winter the people like to eat Muscheln Rheinischer Art (Rhenish-style mussels) as well as Reibekuchen which is a fried potato pancake served with apple sauce.

Düsseldorf is known for its strong Dijon-like mustard served in a traditional pot called "Mostertpöttche", which was immortalised in a still life by Vincent van Gogh in 1884. Therefore, also among the local dishes is the Düsseldorfer Senfrostbraten, including medium rare steaks roasted with Düsseldorf mustard and onion crust. Sides may include roast potatoes and a small salad in a restaurant, making this local dish a menu staple where upscale cuisine is served. Düsseldorf's Old Town has over 250 pubs and bars, often serving Altbier in a 0.25-liter glass. Düsseldorf Altbier is top-fermented beer of spicy aroma.

Düsseldorf is noted for its diverse culinary scene. It hosts a large Japanese community, which has contributed to a strong presence of authentic Asian cuisine. Düsseldorf’s gastronomy has been recognised by the travel guide Lonely Planet for its quality and variety. In addition to a wide range of international dining options, the city is home to several Michelin-starred restaurants.

Local specialties include:

Halve Hahn – this dish is made from a half a double rye roll, which is another of the specialties of Düsseldorf, buttered, with a thick slice of aged Gouda cheese, onions, mustard, ground paprika and sour pickles.

Himmel un Aad – a dish of mashed potatoes and apples along with slices of blutwurst. Caramelized onions are usually served with this meal.

Reibekuchen is another famous dish from Düsseldorf; this dish is usually drizzled with Rübensyrup (beet syrup) and is served on pumpernickel slices along with applesauce.

=== Beer ===
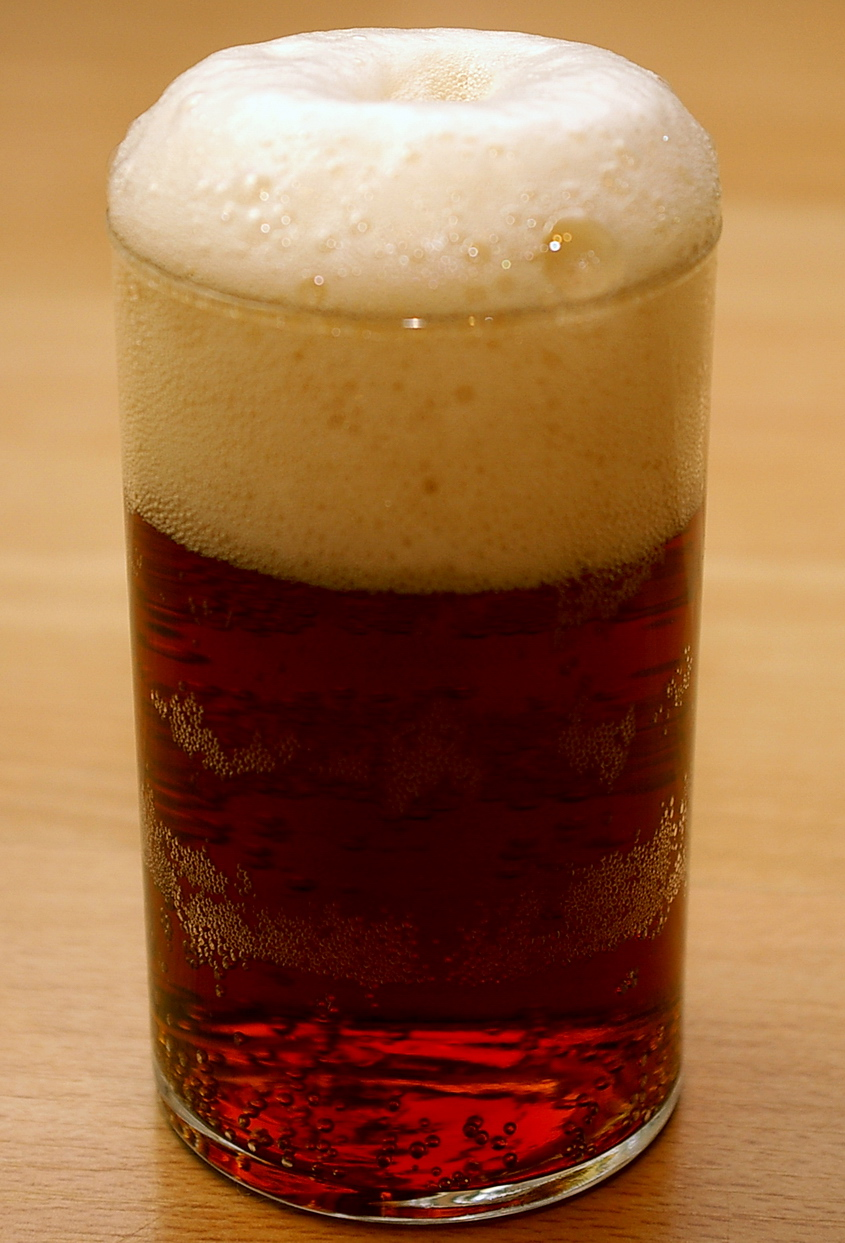
Altbier, a traditional top-fermented beer typical of Düsseldorf.

Düsseldorf is well known for its Altbier, a hoppy beer which translates as old [style] beer, a reference to the pre-lager brewing method of using a warm top-fermenting yeast like British pale ales. Over time the Alt yeast adjusted to lower temperatures, and the Alt brewers would store or lager the beer after fermentation, leading to a cleaner, crisper beer. The name "altbier" first appeared in the 19th century to differentiate the beers of Düsseldorf from the new pale lager that was gaining a hold on Germany.

Brewers in Düsseldorf used the pale malts that were used for the modern pale lagers, but retained the old ("alt") method of using warm fermenting yeasts. The first brewery to use the name Alt was Schumacher, which opened in 1838. The founder, Mathias Schumacher, allowed the beer to mature in cool conditions in wooden casks for longer than normal, and laid the foundation for the modern alt – amber coloured and lagered. The result is a pale beer that has some of the lean dryness of a lager but with fruity notes as well.

There are five brewpubs in Düsseldorf that brew Altbier on site: Brauerei im Füchschen, Schumacher, Hausbrauerei Zum Schlüssel, Uerige, and Brauerei Kürzer. Four of the five are in the historic centre (Altstadt); the fifth, Schumacher, lies between the Altstadt and Düsseldorf Hauptbahnhof, but also maintains an establishment in the Altstadt (Im Goldenen Kessel) across the street from Hausbrauerei Zum Schlüssel.

Each (except Brauerei Kürzer) produces a special, secret, seasonal "Sticke" version in small quantities, though the names vary: Schlüssel spells it "Stike", without the "c", while Schumacher calls its special beer "Latzenbier", meaning "slat beer", possibly because the kegs from which it was poured had been stored on raised shelves. Füchschen's seasonal is its Weihnachtsbier (Christmas beer), available in bottles starting mid-November, and served in the brewpub on Christmas Eve.

=== Christmas market ===
Every Christmas, the city of Düsseldorf uses the city centre to host one of the largest Christmas gatherings in Germany. The Christmas festival occurs every year from 17 November until 23 December. This Christmas festival is responsible for a large portion of tourism every year as many people from nearby areas come to the city to drink mulled wine and hot chocolate and watch craftsmen blow glass and create art. The event takes place among many small wooden buildings all clustered in the middle of the city for all the citizens to enjoy. The event, to many visitors, has an old European feel, but is very lively.

=== Rivalry with Cologne ===
Düsseldorf and Cologne have had a "fierce regional rivalry". The rivalry includes carnival parades, football, ice hockey and beer. People in Cologne prefer Kölsch while people in Düsseldorf prefer Altbier. Some waiters and patrons will "scorn" and make a "mockery" of people who order Altbier in Cologne and Kölsch in Düsseldorf. The rivalry has been described as a "love-hate relationship".

== Cityscape ==
=== Notable buildings ===
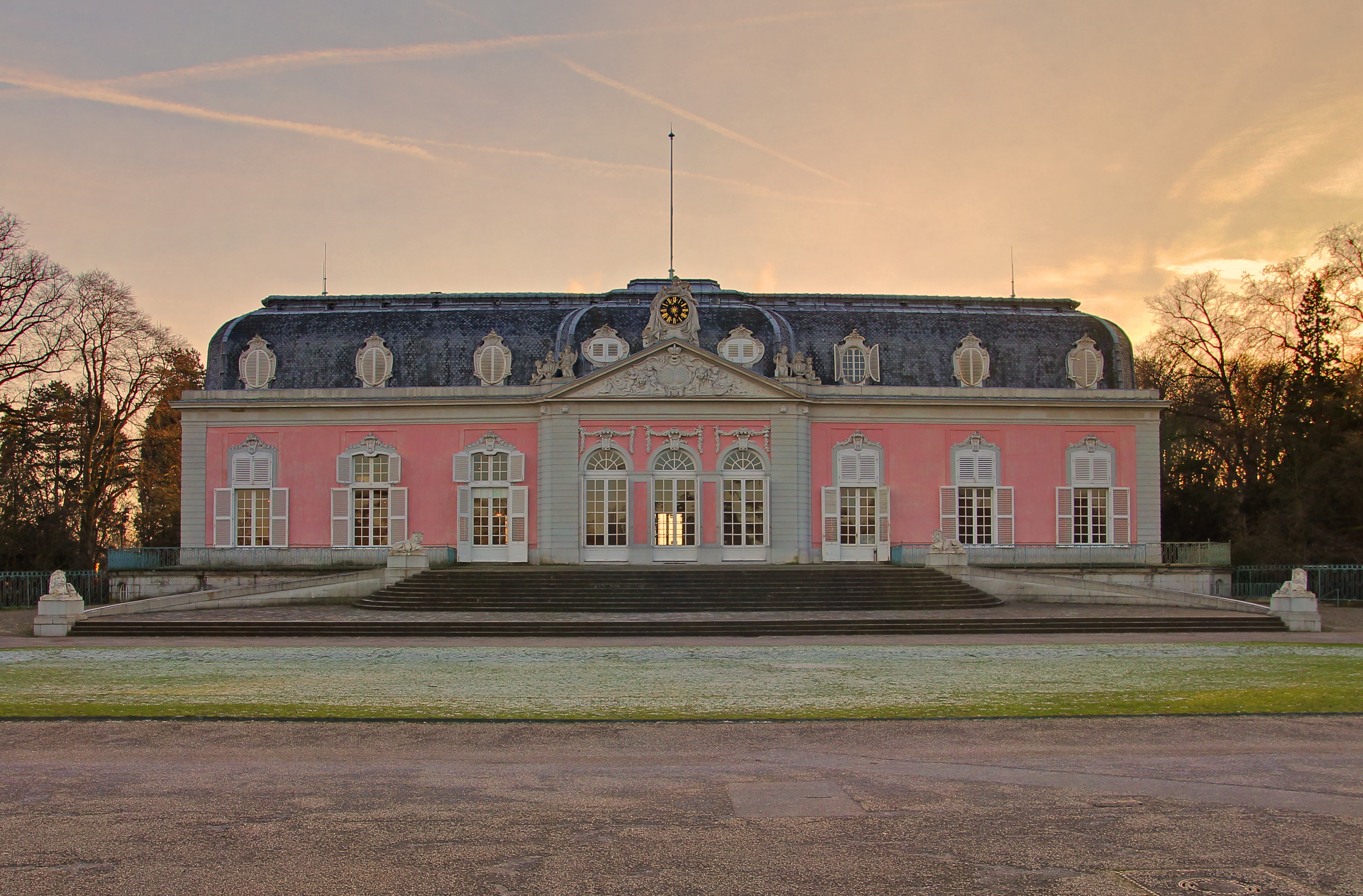
Benrath Palace, Corp de Logis

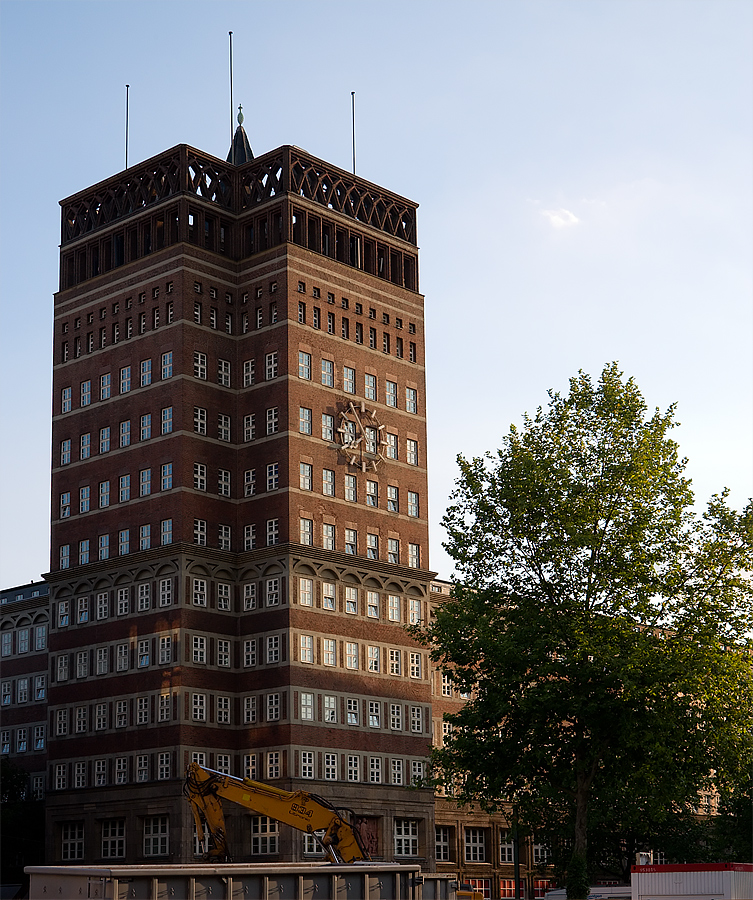
The Wilhelm Marx House was Germany's first high-rise building.

- Rheinturm (TV tower), the city's main landmark (1982: 234 m [ 768 ft ], since 2004: 240.50 m [ 789.0 ft ]), the lights of which comprise the world's largest digital clock
- Neuer Zollhof in Düsseldorf-Hafen, designed by Frank Gehry
- The Colorium, an 18-storey tower designed by Alsop and Partners, also in Düsseldorf-Hafen
- Schloss Benrath (Benrath palace), rococo castle
- The Grupello-Haus, probably designed by the Italian architect Matteo Alberti (architect) in 1706 for Duke Johann Wilhelm
- Johanneskirche, largest Protestant church in Düsseldorf
- Schloss Heltorf, the biggest palace in Düsseldorf, since 1662 homestead of the noble family Grafen von Spee
- Schloss Jägerhof, an old hunting lodge at the Hofgarten, today a Goethe Museum
- The Wilhelm Marx House of 1922/24: at twelve storeys high, it was Germany's first high-rise building.
- The Stahlhof of 1906, the administrative centre of Germany's steel economy until 1945
- The Stummhaus of 1925, another early German high-rise building
- Gerresheim Basilica
- St. Suitbertus (Düsseldorf-Kaiserswerth)
- Hotel Römischer Kaiser, built in 1903–04
- Kalkum Castle, a water castle in the district of the same name
- DRV Tower, 120-metre-high (394 ft) tower constructed in 1978
- GAP 15, an 85-metre-high (279 ft) building constructed in 2005 near Königsallee
- ARAG-Tower; at 131 m (430 ft) in height, it is Düsseldorf's highest office building; designed by Sir Norman Foster.
- Eight bridges span the Rhine at Düsseldorf; they, too, are city landmarks.
- Eastern pylon of Reisholz Rhine Powerline Crossing, an electricity pylon under whose legs runs a rail

=== Parks and gardens ===
- Botanischer Garten Düsseldorf, a modern botanical garden
- Hofgarten, old city park
- Nordpark with the Japanese garden
- Südfriedhof (South Cemetery)
- Volksgarten adjacent to Südpark

== Sports ==
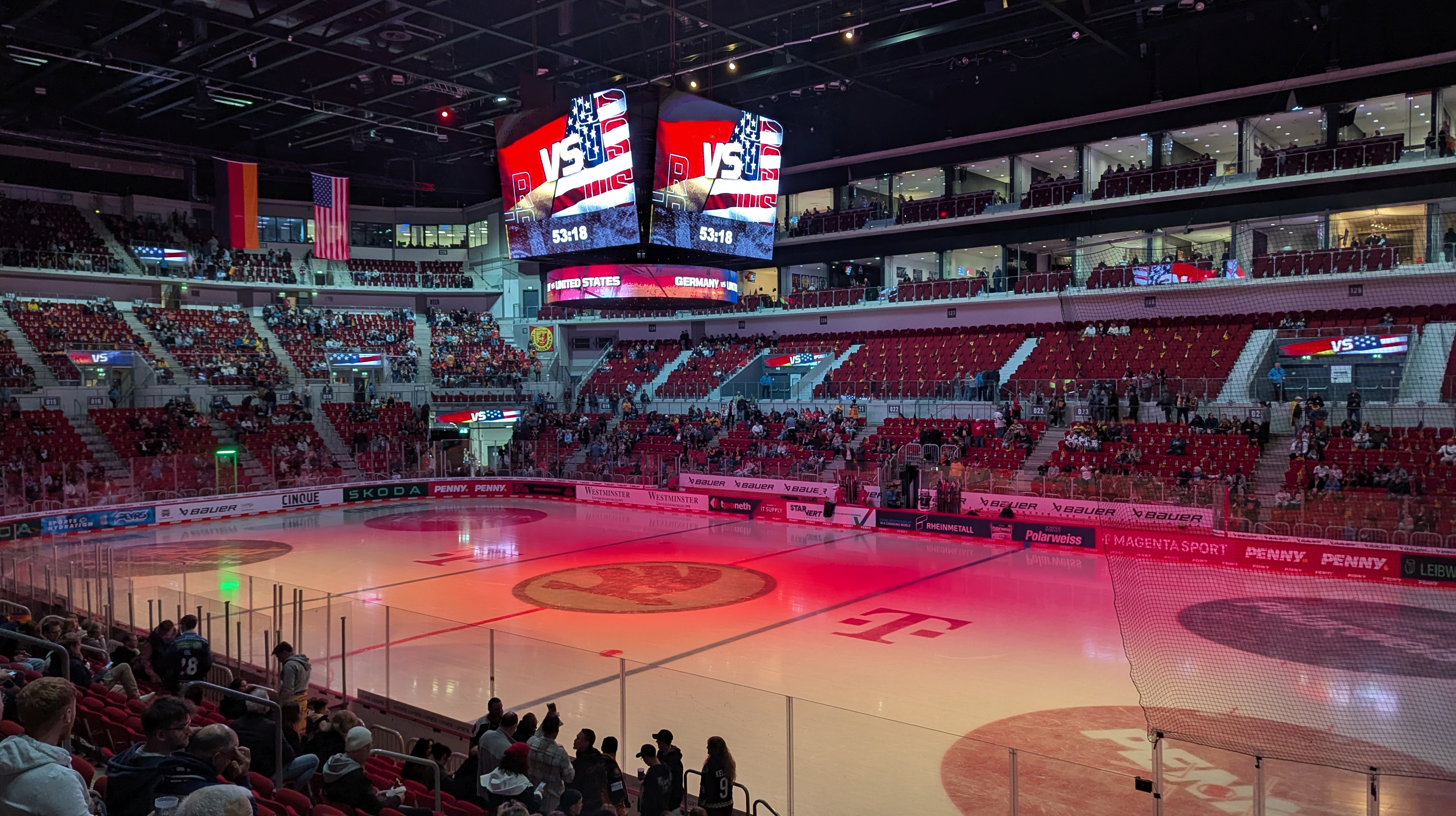
Interior view of PSD Bank Dome

Düsseldorf's main football team Fortuna Düsseldorf won the 1933 German championship, the DFB-Pokal in 1979 and 1980, and were finalists in the European Cup Winners Cup in 1979. They currently play in the 3. Liga after being relegated from the 2. Bundesliga in 2026. They play their matches in the Merkur Spiel-Arena (formerly known as the "ESPRIT Arena" from 2009 to 2018 and as the "LTU Arena" before 2009), a multi-functional stadium with a capacity of 54,500 people. Düsseldorf was one of nine host cities for the 1974 FIFA World Cup, and is one of ten venues that staged the 2024 UEFA European Championship.

Other sports in Düsseldorf are ice hockey (the Düsseldorfer EG which play in the PSD Bank Dome) and American football. The Düsseldorf Panther are one of the most successful teams in Germany with six German Bowl titles and the Eurobowl victory in 1995. In addition the Junior Team are the most successful youth department in Germany with fifteen Junior Bowl victories. Rhine Fire were an established team of the NFL Europe and won the World Bowl two times in 1998 and 2000. The team was revived in 3023, winning the European League of Football in 2023 and 2024.

Borussia Düsseldorf is the most successful table tennis team in Germany with Timo Boll). Other professional clubs are handball (HSG Düsseldorf and Bergischer HC), basketball (Düsseldorf Giants), baseball (Düsseldorf Senators) and dancing (Rot-Weiß Düsseldorf). Düsseldorf also has a cricket team, the Düsseldorf Blackcaps, who play in the regional NRW league.

The Düsseldorf Dragons rugby union team played in the 2. Bundesliga, the second tier of German rugby as of 2017/18.

The Rochusclub has hosted several international tennis tournaments, including the Düsseldorf Grand Prix from 1905 to 1977, the World Team Cup from 1978 until 2012, the ATP Düsseldorf Open in 2013 and 2014, and the WTA Düsseldorf Open from 1969 to 1975.

Düsseldorf hosted the Grand Départ for the Tour de France in July 2017.

== Education ==
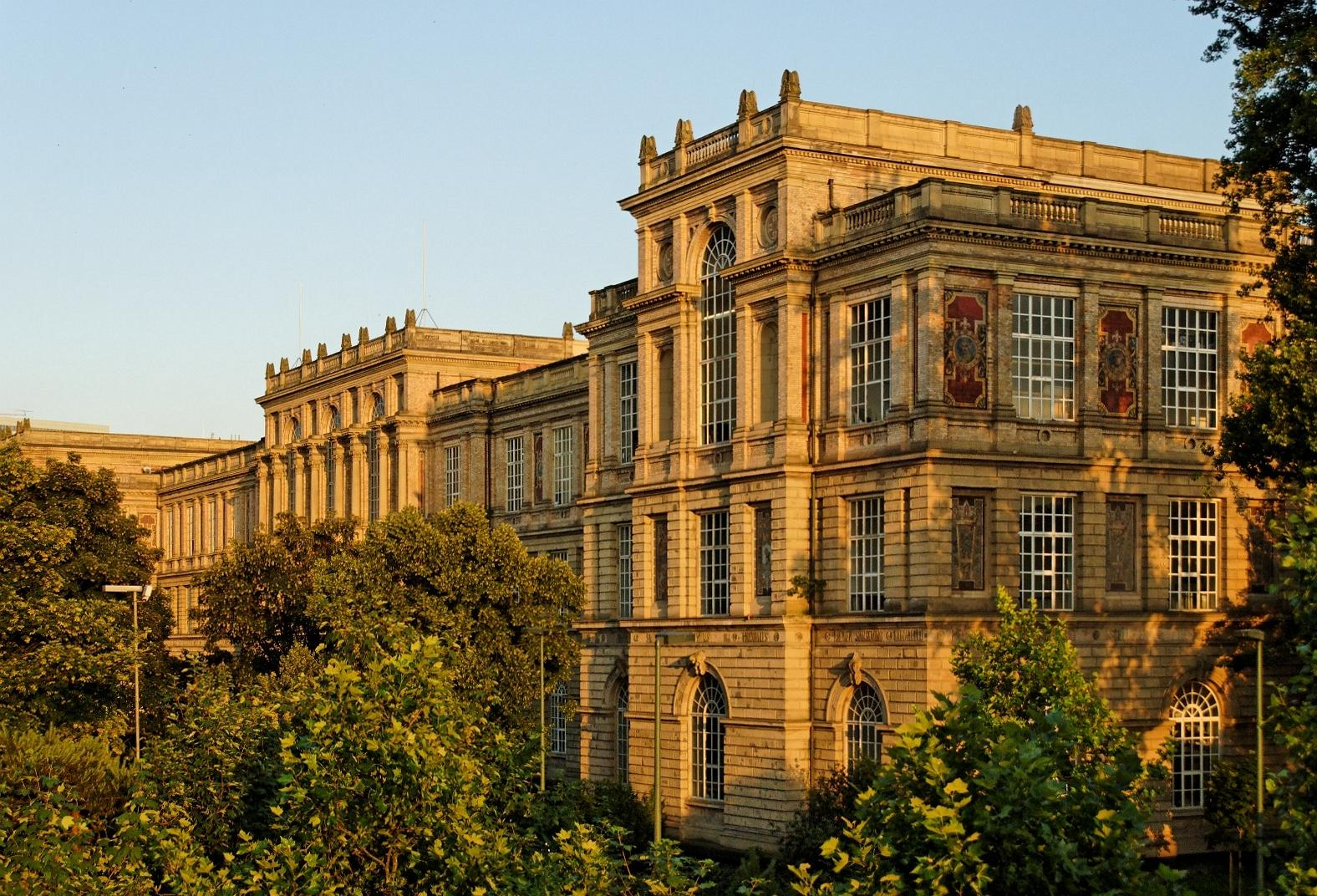
Kunstakademie Düsseldorf

Heinrich Heine University Düsseldorf is located in the southern part of the city. It has about 30,000 students and a wide range of subjects in natural sciences, mathematics, computer sciences, philosophy, social sciences, arts, languages, medicine, pharmacy, economy and the law. The institution was founded in 1907 as an academy for practical medicine and was elevated to university status in 1965. It has its current name since 1988.

Other academic institutions include:

- the Clara Schumann Musikschule (music school)
- the Robert Schumann Hochschule
- the Kunstakademie Düsseldorf (Academy of Fine Arts) which is famous for high-profile artists like Joseph Beuys, Paul Klee, Nam June Paik, Gerhard Richter, the Bechers, and Andreas Gursky
- the Hochschule Düsseldorf (University of Applied Sciences)
- the AMD Academy of Fashion and Design
- the Max Planck Institute for Iron Research
- the Goethe Institute
- Verwaltungs- und Wirtschafts-Akademie Düsseldorf
- WHU – Otto Beisheim School of Management (Düsseldorf Campus)

International primary and secondary schools:

- International School of Düsseldorf
- Lycée français international Simone Veil
- Japanische Internationale Schule in Düsseldorf

== Twin towns – sister cities ==
Düsseldorf is twinned with:

- (United Kingdom) Reading, UK (1988)
- Chemnitz, Germany (1988)
- Haifa, Israel (1988)
- Warsaw, Poland (1989)
- Chongqing, China (2004)
- Palermo, Italy (2016)
- Chiba Prefecture, Japan (2019)
- Chernivtsi, Ukraine (2022)
- Moscow, Russia (1992); suspended due to the 2022 Russian invasion of Ukraine

=== Friendship and cooperation ===
Düsseldorf also cooperates with:

- Toulouse, France (2003)
- Tenerife, Spain (2003)
- Shenyang, China (2004)
- Guangzhou, China (2006)
- Montreal, Canada (2015)
- Portland, Oregon, United States of America (2024)

== Notable people ==
=== Honors ===
The city of Düsseldorf awards, in addition to honorary citizenship, other honors and distinctions.

Since 1972, the Heinrich Heine Prize has been awarded every three years, and since 1981 every two years, to “individuals who, through their intellectual work in the spirit of the human rights for which Heinrich Heine advocated, promote social and political progress, serve international understanding, or spread awareness of the interconnectedness of all people.” The predecessor of this prize was the Immermann Prize.

The Helmut Käutner Prize is an award given every two years to individuals who “through their work have strongly supported and influenced the development of German film culture, promoted its understanding, and contributed to its recognition.”

Since 1972, the city of Düsseldorf has awarded seven annual grant prizes for outstanding artistic achievements to artists in the fields of visual arts, performing arts, music, and literature. It also supports artists in their further development. The Förderpreis für Literatur der Landeshauptstadt Düsseldorf (Literary Advancement Prize of the State Capital Düsseldorf) is awarded to artists and groups, particularly in the fields of poetry, writing, criticism, and translation. The prize is awarded either for a single artistic achievement or for the overall work of a young artist whose further development deserves support.

The Kunstpreis der Landeshauptstadt Düsseldorf (Art Prize of the State Capital Düsseldorf) is an annual award given to a visual artist whose work is “pioneering for the development of contemporary art.”

=== Born before 1850 ===
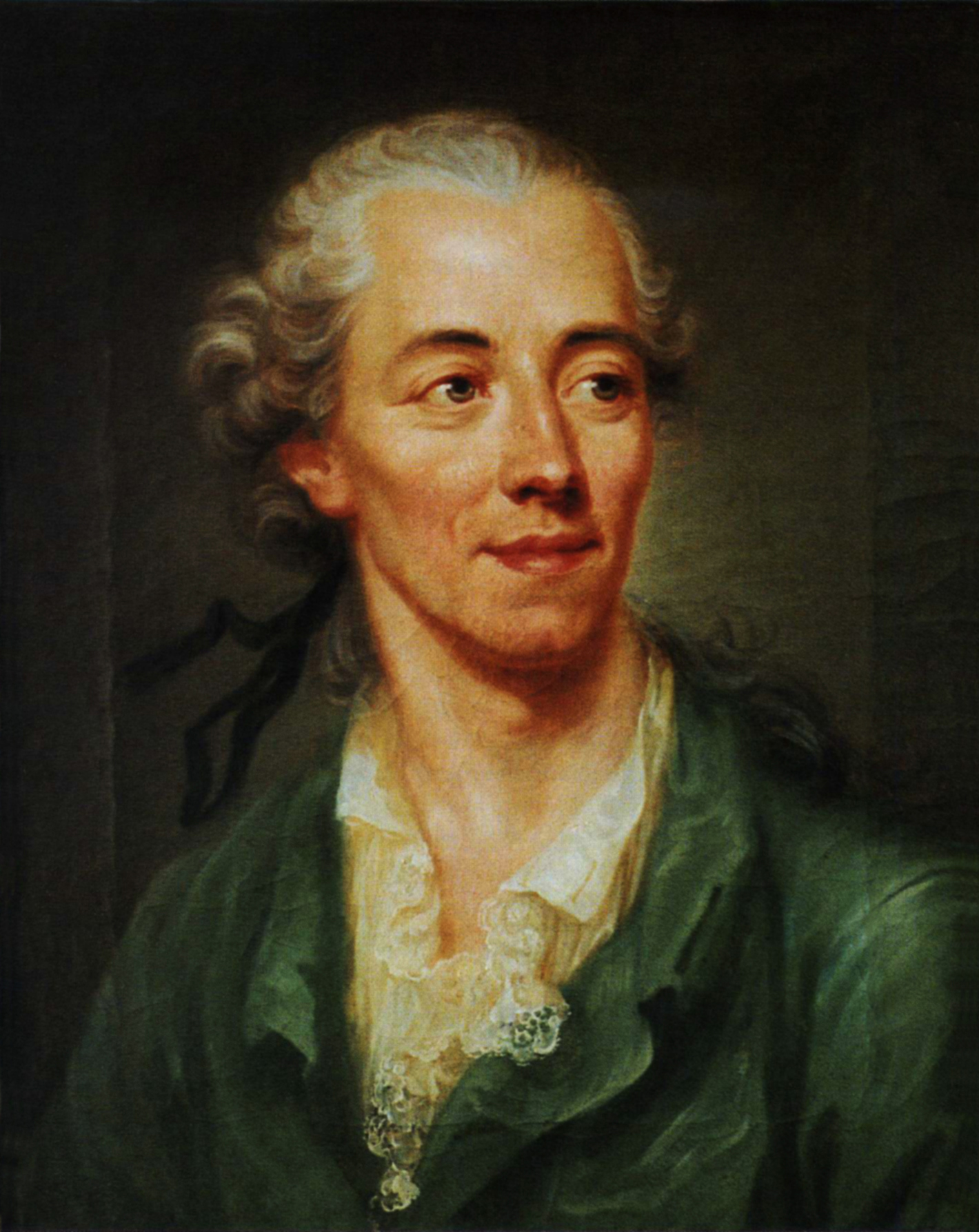
Johann Georg Jacobi, 1750

- Anne of Cleves (1515–1557), Married to Henry VIII
- François-Charles de Velbrück (1719–1784), Prince-Bishop of Liège
- Helena Curtens (1722–1738), last victim of the witch trials in the Lower Rhine
- Johann Georg Jacobi (1740–1814), writer
- Friedrich Heinrich Jacobi (1743–1819), philosopher and writer
- Peter von Cornelius (1783–1867), painter
- Heinrich Heine (1797–1856), poet and writer
- Lorenz Clasen (1812–1899), painter
- Wilhelm Camphausen (1818–1885), painter
- Louise Strantz (1823–1909), composer and singer
- Paul von Hatzfeldt (1831–1901), diplomat
- Anton Josef Reiss (1835–1900), sculptor
- Eugen Richter (1838–1906), politician and publicist
- Arnold Forstmann (1842–1914), landscape painter
- Peter Janssen (1844–1908), painter, professor at the Art Academy
- Karl Rudolf Sohn (1845–1908), painter
- Felix Klein (1849–1925), mathematician

=== Born 1851–1900 ===
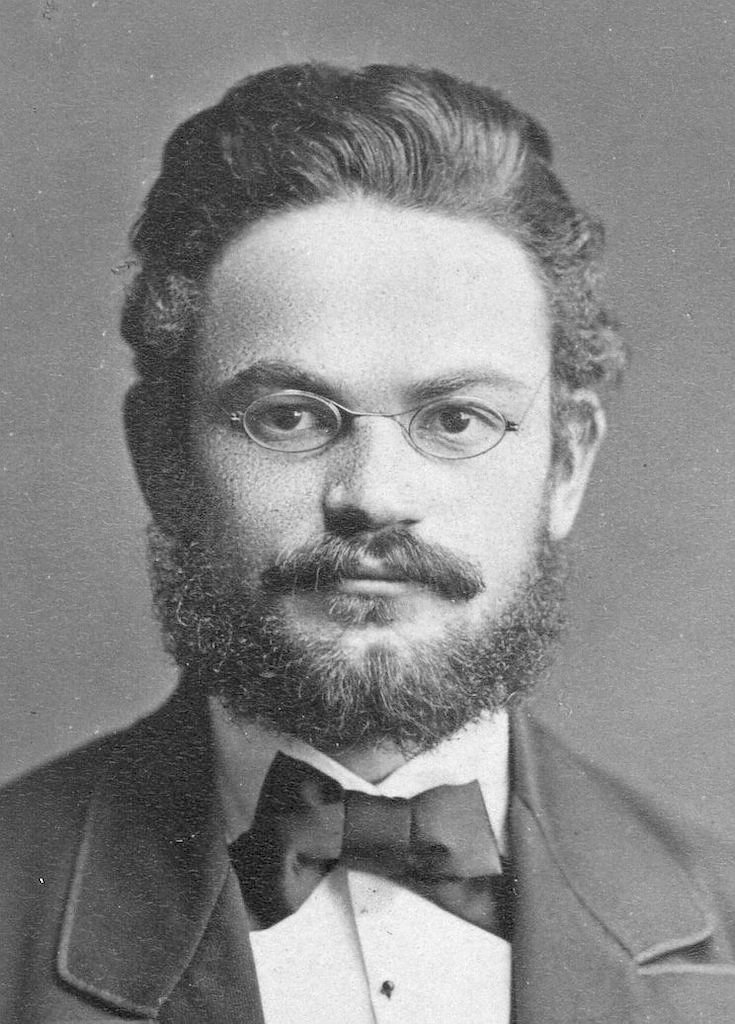
Georg Wenker, 1878

- Georg Wenker (1852–1911), linguist, founder of linguistic atlas of the German Reich (Wenkeratlas)
- Karl Janssen (1855–1927), sculptor, professor at the Art Academy
- Leopold Graf von Kalckreuth (1855–1928), painter
- Maria Countess von Kalckreuth (1857–1897), painter
- Bruno Schmitz (1858–1916), architect
- Otto Hupp (1859–1949), signature graphic artist, engraver
- Albert Herzfeld (1865–1943), painter and author
- Agnes Elisabeth Overbeck (1870–1919), composer and pianist
- Hanns Heinz Ewers (1871–1943), writer and filmmaker
- Wilhelm Levison (1876–1947), historian
- Elly Ney (1882–1968), world-famous concert pianist
- Friedrich Grimm (1888–1959), lawyer, professor, Nazi politician and author
- Willy Reetz (1892–1963), painter, "Düsseldorf School"
- Hermann Knüfken (1893–1976), marine soldier, revolutionary, union activist, resistance fighter and secret agent
- Ludwig Gehre (1895–1945), officer and resistance fighter
- Hans Globke (1898–1973), jurist, National Socialist, from 1949 Assistant Secretary, then Secretary of State in the Federal Chancellery (1953–1963)
- Gustaf Gründgens (1899–1963), actor
- Karl von Appen (1900–1981), stage designer

=== Born after 1900 ===
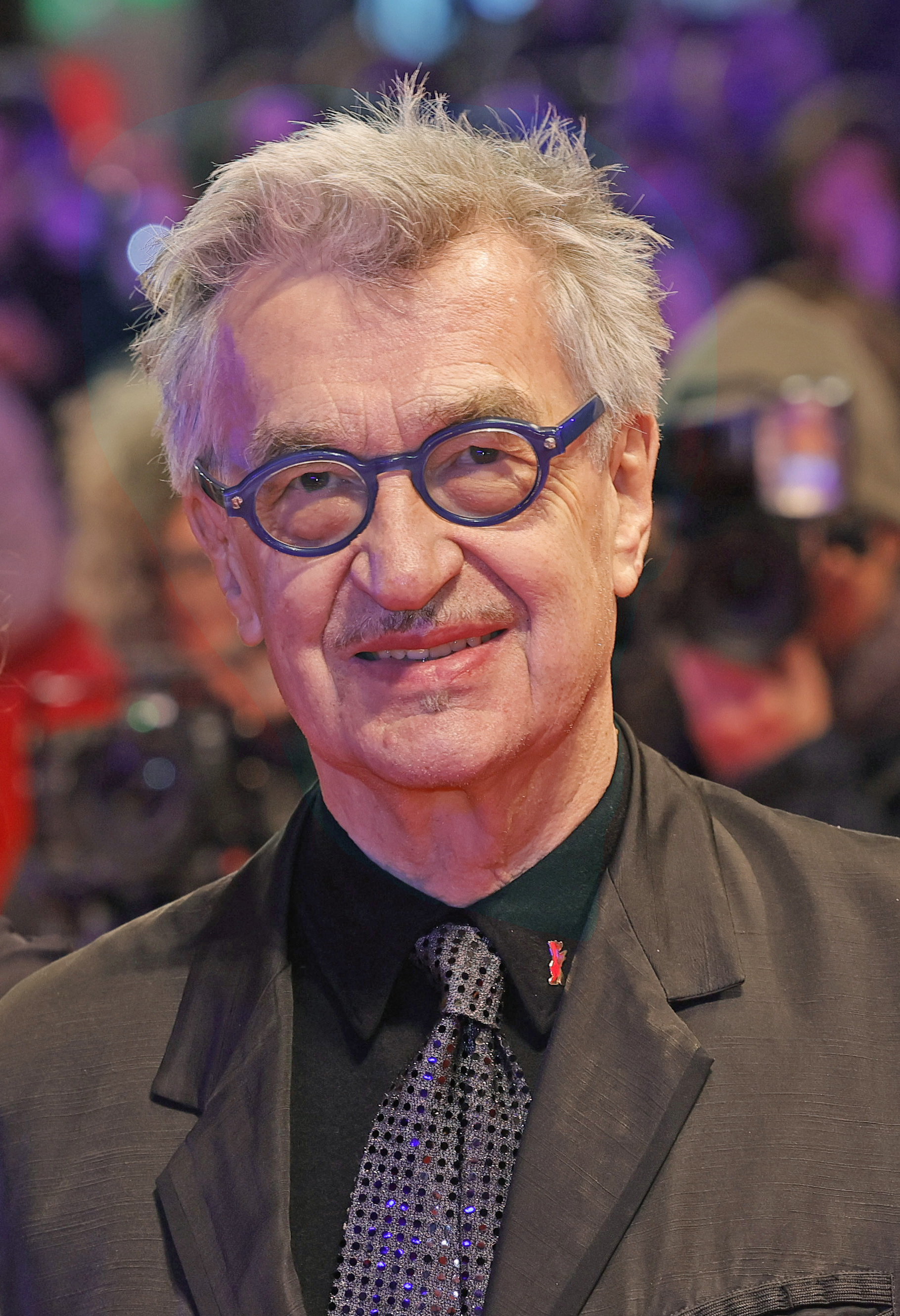
Wim Wenders, 2024

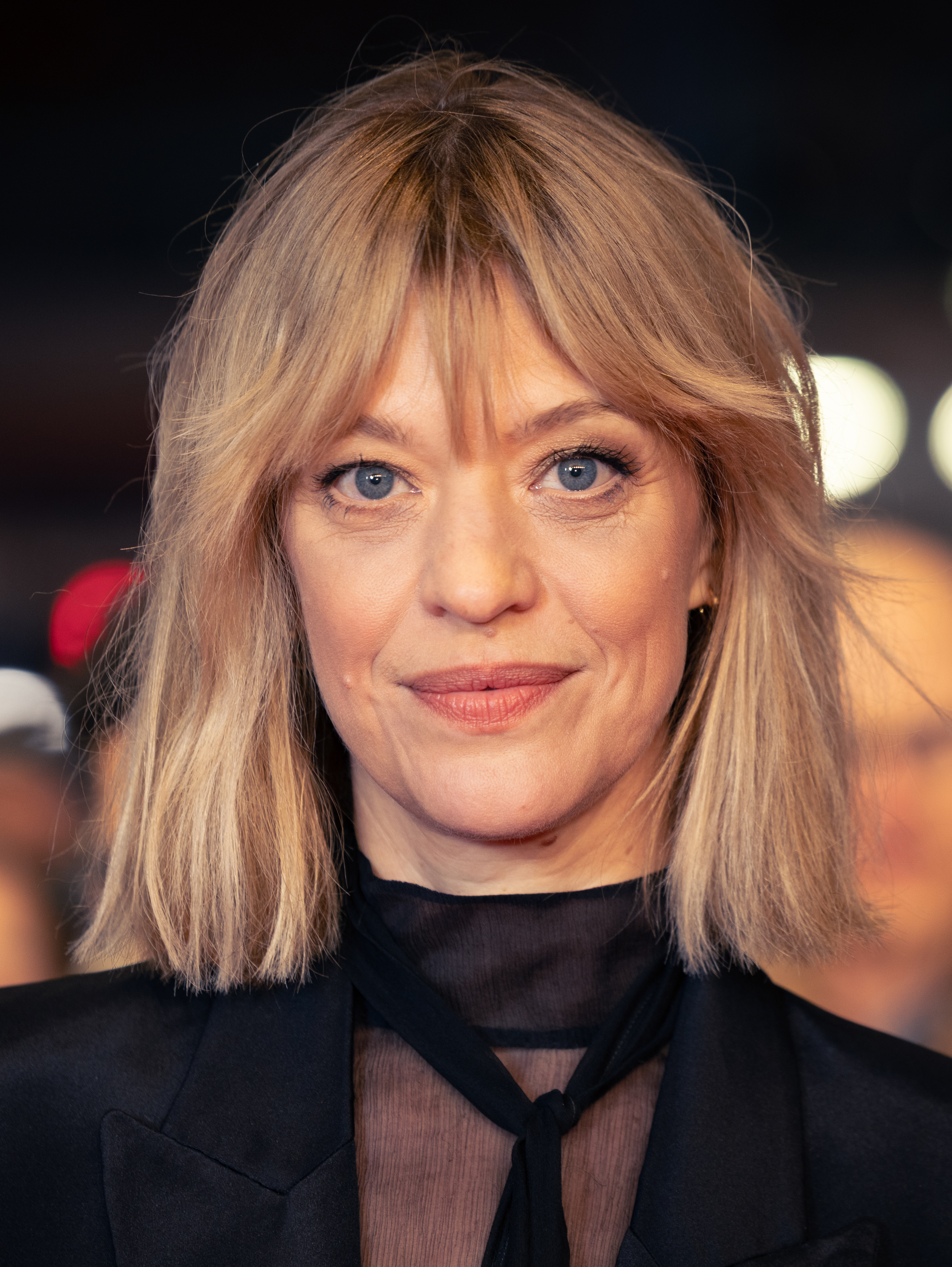
Heike Makatsch, 2025

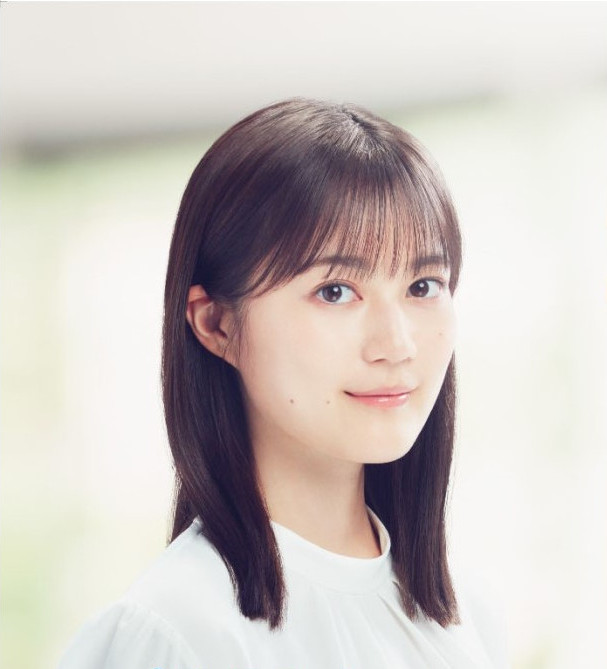
Erika Ikuta, 2022

- Max Lorenz (1901–1975), tenor
- Joseph H. Heinen (1903–1981), founder, Heinen's Grocery Stores, Cleveland, Ohio
- Toni Ulmen (1906–1976), motorcycle and car race driver
- Karl Pschigode (1907–1971), actor and theatre director
- Helmut Käutner (1908–1980), film director and actor
- Hilarius Gilges (1909–1933), Afro-German actor, victim of Nazism
- Ernst Klusen (1909–1988), musicologist
- Luise Rainer (1910–2014), actress
- Josef Peters (1914–2001), racing driver
- Ursula Benser (1915–2001), painter
- Fred Beckey (1923–2017), rock climber, mountaineer, author
- Jürgen Habermas (1929–2026), philosopher and social theorist
- Carl-Ludwig Wagner (1930–2012), politician (CDU)
- Wim Wenders (born 1945), filmmaker, playwright, author
- Carmen Thomas (born 1946), journalist, radio and television presenter, author and lecturer
- Marius Müller-Westernhagen (born 1948), actor and musician
- Heiner Koch (born 1954), Roman Catholic bishop
- Andreas Gursky (born 1955), photographer
- Bettina Böttinger (born 1956), TV-presenter
- Birgitt Bender (born 1956), politician (The Greens), Member of Landtag and Bundestag
- Tommi Stumpff (born 1958), musician
- Petra Müllejans (born 1959), conductor and violinist
- Bettina Hoffmann (born 1959), musician and musicologist
- Andreas Frege (born 1962), "Campino", singer in the band Die Toten Hosen
- René Obermann (born 1963), manager, husband of Maybrit Illner
- Jörg Schmadtke (born 1964), football manager
- André Olbrich (born 1967), guitarist in the band Blind Guardian
- Michael Preetz (born 1967), footballer
- Svenja Schulze (born 1968), politician (SPD)
- Heike Makatsch (born 1971), actress and singer
- Marco Schmitz (born 1979), politician (CDU)
- Angela Erwin (born 1980), politician
- Tetsuya Kakihara (born 1982), voice actor and singer
- Erika Ikuta (born 1997), Japanese actress, a former member of Nogizaka46

=== Associated with Düsseldorf ===
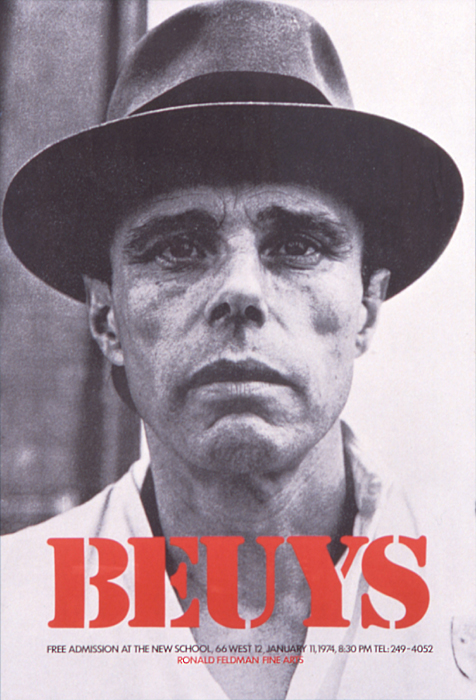
Joseph Beuys, 1974

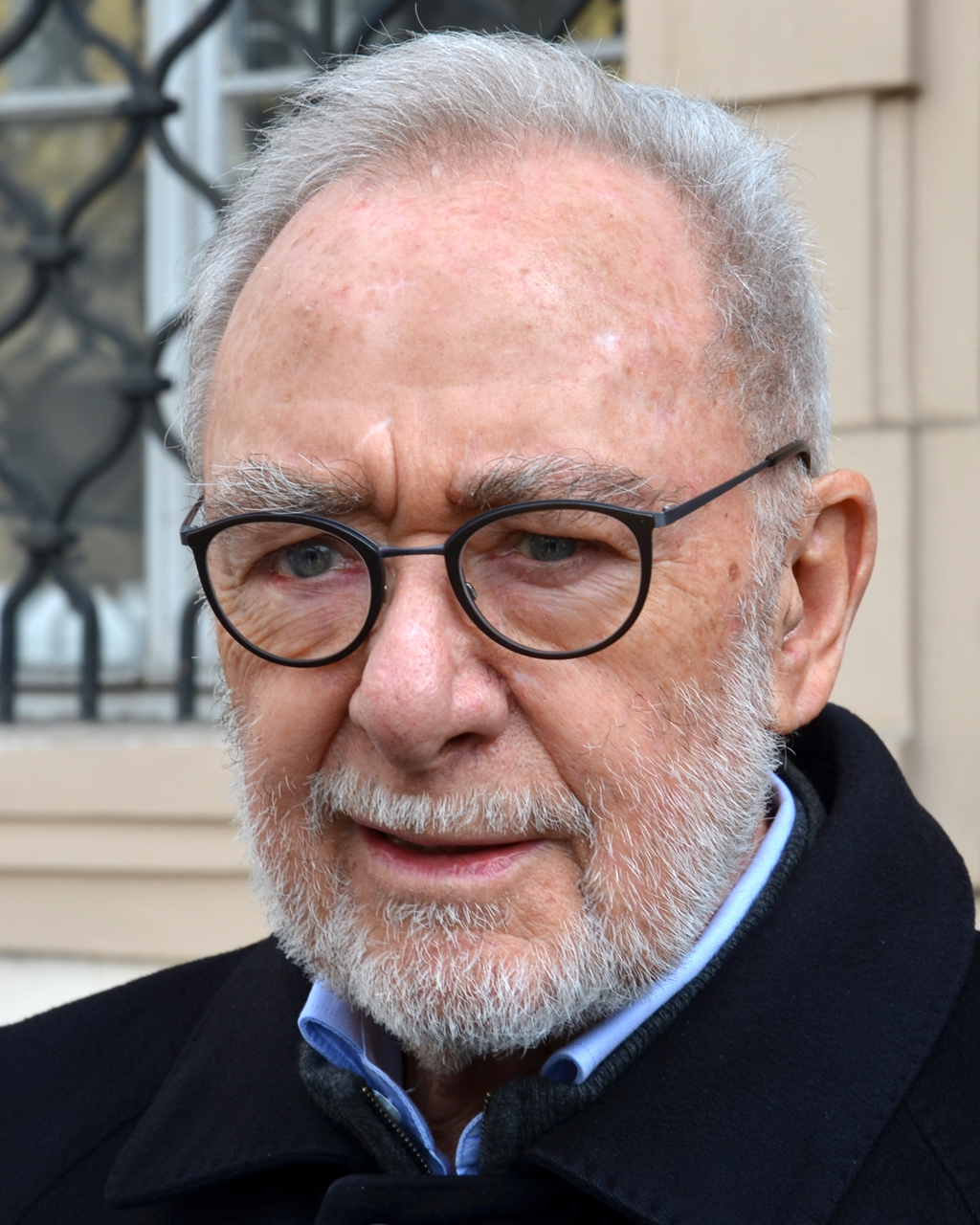
Gerhard Richter, 2017

- William Thomas Mulvany (1806–1885 in Düsseldorf), entrepreneur
- Robert Schumann (1810–1856), composer, 1850–1854 urban music director in Düsseldorf
- Alfred Rethel (1816–1859 in Düsseldorf), history painter
- Christian Eduard Boettcher (1818–1889), painter who lived, worked and died in Düsseldorf
- Clara Schumann (1819–1896), pianist and composer, wife of Robert Schumann, frequent host of Johannes Brahms in Düsseldorf (1850–1854)
- Emanuel Leutze (1816–1868), painter, Düsseldorf School
- Louise Dumont (1862–1932 in Düsseldorf), actress and 1904 founder of the Schauspielhaus Düsseldorf
- Johanna "Mother" Ey (1864–1947 in Düsseldorf), gallery owner
- Peter Behrens (1868–1940), architect and director of the Düsseldorf Art Academy
- Wilhelm Kreis (1873–1955), architect and director of the School of Applied Arts Düsseldorf
- Peter Kürten (1883–1931), called "The Vampire of Düsseldorf", committed in Düsseldorf during the period between February and November 1929 series of sexual homicides
- Adolf Uzarski (1885–1970 in Düsseldorf), writer, painter and graphic artist
- Emil Fahrenkamp (1885–1966), architect and director of Düsseldorf Art Academy 1937–1945
- Betty Knox (1906–1963), dancer with variety act Wilson, Keppel and Betty and war correspondent. She lived in the city during her later years and died there.
- Joseph Beuys (1921–1986), artist and art theorist; professor at the Düsseldorf Art Academy 1961–1972
- Günter Grass (1927–2015), author and artist, recipient of the 1999 Nobel Prize in Literature; student at the Düsseldorf Art Academy
- Ernest Martin (born 1932), theatre director, theatre manager and actor in Düsseldorf
- Gerhard Richter (born 1932), visual artist; student and professor at the Düsseldorf Art Academy

== See also ==
- Japan Day in Düsseldorf
- OPENCities
