= ISR Elementary School Düsseldorf =

ISR International Elementary School in Düsseldorf, Germany

Coordinates: 51.2296°N 6.7511°E

- Comeniusstraße 1, Düsseldorf-Oberkassel; Germany

Information
- Type: Private international elementary school
- Grades: 1–6
- Capacity: c. 500
- Language: English (instruction), German (core subject)
- Affiliation: ISR International School on the Rhine
- Website: www.isr-school.de/isr-elementary-school-duesseldorf/

ISR Elementary School Düsseldorf is a private international elementary school in Düsseldorf-Oberkassel, North Rhine-Westphalia, Germany. It is being established by ISR International School on the Rhine as the school's second campus, serving Grades 1 to 6.

== Background ==
ISR International School on the Rhine, founded in 2003, operates its main campus in Neuss with more than 1,200 students from around 60 countries, alongside kindergartens in Neuss, Düsseldorf-Niederkassel and Meerbusch-Büderich. According to the school, capacity at the Neuss campus was largely exhausted despite two building extensions, and more than half of ISR families live in Düsseldorf, a disproportionate share of them in Stadtbezirk 4, within walking or cycling distance of the new location.

ISR's owner, Peter Soliman, acquired the site from the City of Düsseldorf in 2023 as part of the school's long-term expansion plans. The campus is planned for up to approximately 500 students, with drop-off and pick-up organized via minibus routes and a kiss-and-go zone; parts of the property are also intended to be available to residents and local clubs.

== Building ==
The listed school building at Comeniusplatz was constructed in 1912 for a school founded in 1908 as a "Higher Boys' School" at the initiative of Nikolaus Knopp, mayor of the then-independent municipality of Heerdt, whose jurisdiction included Oberkassel, Niederkassel and Lörick. The school's establishment followed the district's rapid growth after the construction of the first Rhine bridge. The Comenius-Gymnasium used the building until relocating to a new campus in 1972, after which the classrooms in the building, renamed "Creativhaus", were used mainly as artists' studios. The building has stood empty since the end of 2025.

The building includes an auditorium and a sports hall. The renovation plans provide for modern classroom technology, a new library, and redesigned playgrounds and outdoor learning spaces.

== Curriculum ==
The curriculum is planned to follow the Cambridge framework, with English as the language of instruction and German as a compulsory core subject. A third language (Spanish, French, Japanese or Mandarin) is planned from Grade 6. Students completing Grade 6 in Düsseldorf are to continue at the ISR secondary school in Neuss, which offers the International Baccalaureate Diploma Programme.

== See also ==
- International School on the Rhine
- International School of Düsseldorf
- List of international schools in Germany
