= Borough 4 (Düsseldorf) =

Stadtbezirk 4
- Borough of Düsseldorf
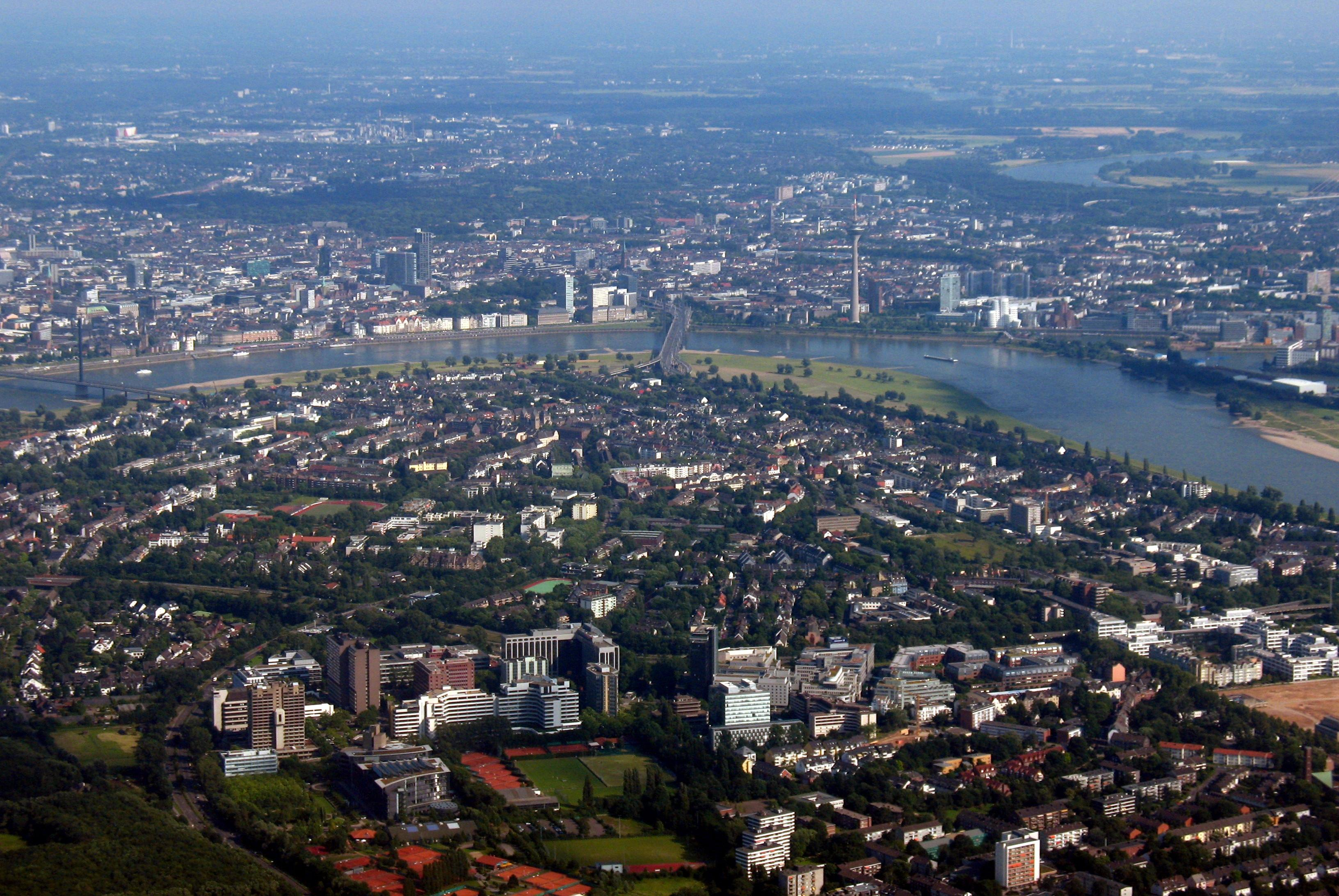
- Aerial view of Düsseldorf-Oberkassel, looking East across the Rhine

- Location of Stadtbezirk 4 within Düsseldorf
- Interactive map of Stadtbezirk 4
- Location within Germany Location within North Rhine-Westphalia
- Coordinates: 51°13′49″N 6°45′17″E
- Country: Germany
- State: North Rhine-Westphalia
- District: Urban district
- City: Düsseldorf
- Subdivisions: 4 quarters

Area
  - Total: 12.62 km^{2} (4.87 sq mi)

Population (2020-12-31)
  - Total: 45,039
  - Density: 3,569/km^{2} (9,243/sq mi)
- Time zone: UTC+01:00 (CET)
  - Summer (DST): UTC+02:00 (CEST)

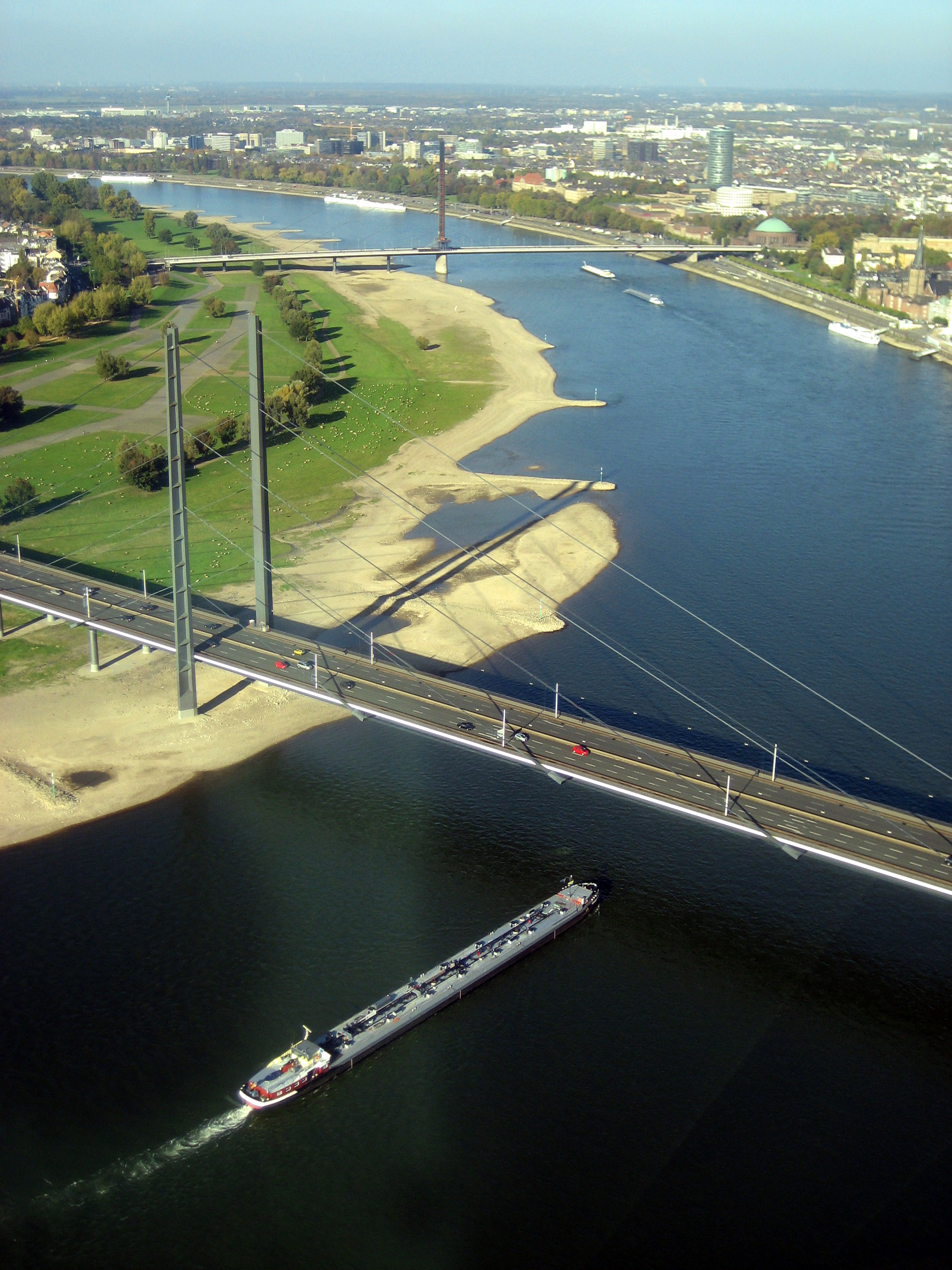
Rheinkniebrücke connects Oberkassel with Unterbilk

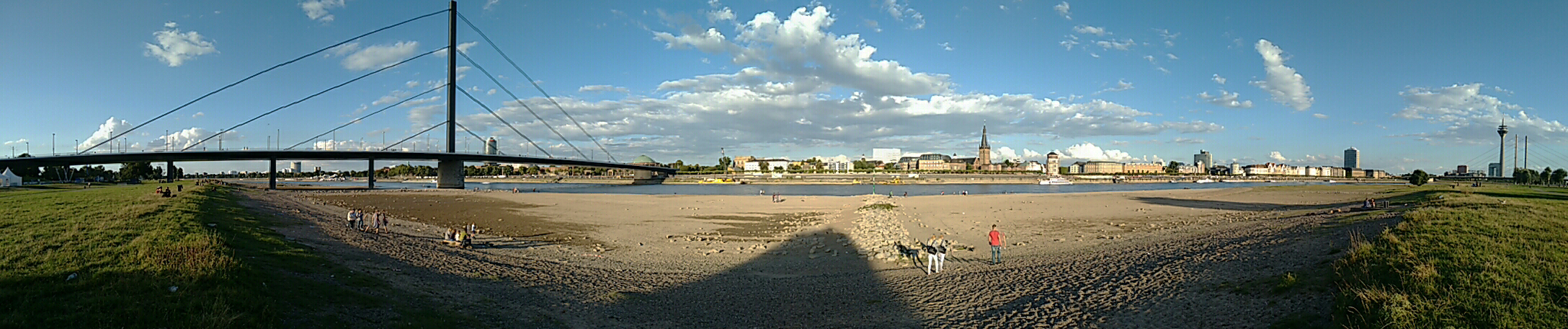
Rheinwiesen park

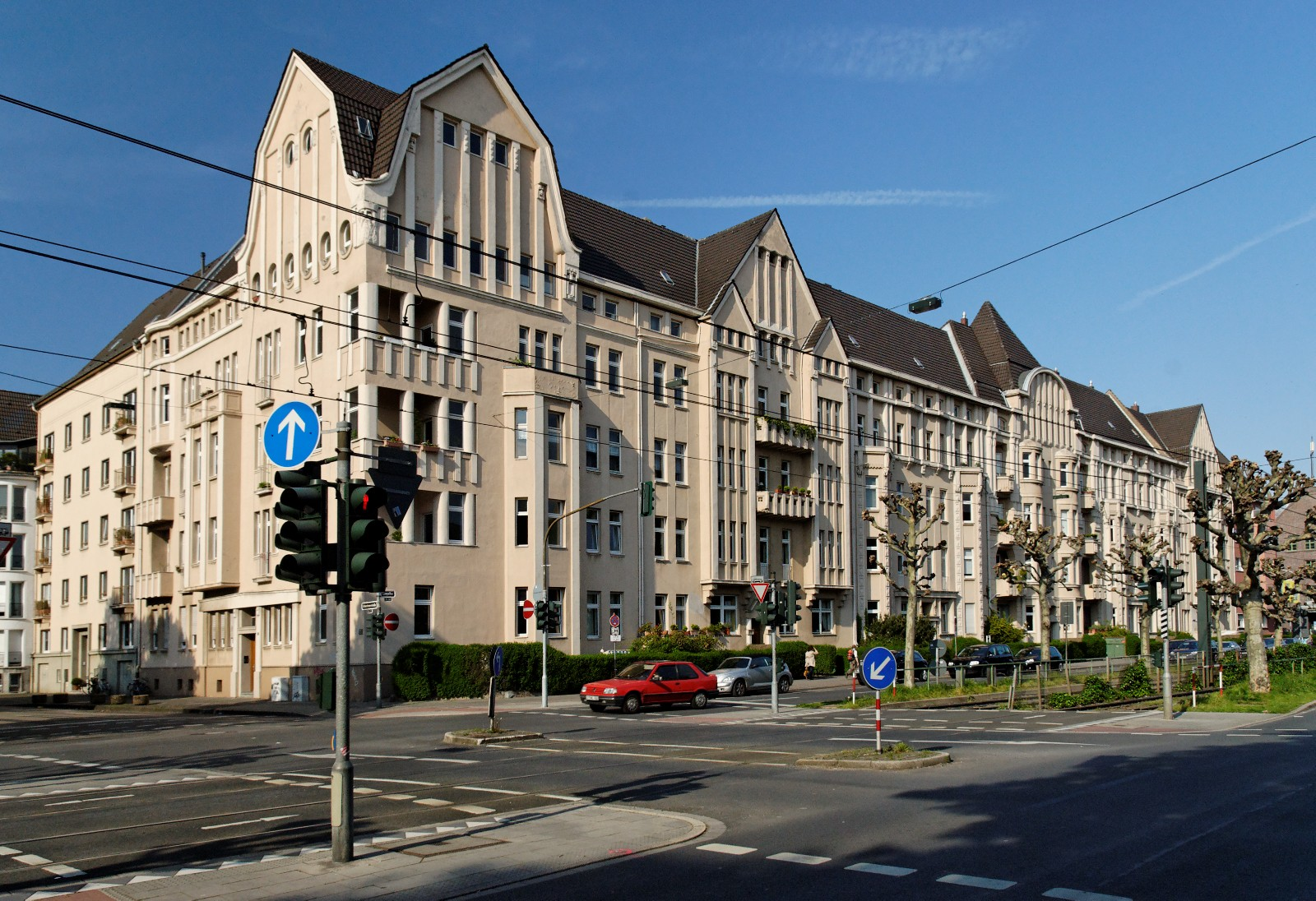
1911-built Kyffhäuserblock Block in Oberkassel

Borough 4 (German: Stadtbezirk 4) is a borough of Düsseldorf, the state capital of North Rhine-Westphalia, Germany. It covers an area of 12.62 square kilometres and has about 45,000 inhabitants (2020).

Borough 4 is the city's only borough on the west bank of the Rhine and its quarters are popular residential areas. Across the river, it shares borders with Düsseldorf boroughs 5, 1 and 3. West and South-west, the borough is bordered by Rhein-Kreis Neuss and the city of Neuss.

== Subdivisions ==
Borough 4 is made up of four Stadtteile (city parts):

#	City part	Population (2020)	Area (km^{2})	Pop. per km^{2}
041	Oberkassel	19,052	3.68	5,149
042	Heerdt	12,395	4.05	3,060
043	Lörick	7,513	2.55	2,935
044	Niederkassel	6,079	2.34	2,565

== Economy ==
The borough is home to the headquarters of Vodafone Germany, bakery chain Kamps, world-leading tea bag producer Teekanne as well as the Rheinische Post publishing house.

== Places of interest ==
=== Arts, culture and entertainment ===
- Largest Fair on the Rhine (only during July)

=== Landmarks ===
- St. Antonius, Oberkassel

=== Parks and open spaces ===
- Rheinwiesen

== Transportation ==
The borough is served by numerous railway stations and highway. Stations include a dense net of both Düsseldorf Stadtbahn light rail- and Rheinbahn tram-stations. The borough can also be reached via Bundesautobahn 57 and Bundesstraße 7.

=== Rhine bridges ===
- B 7 Theodor-Heuss-Brücke
- Oberkasseler Brücke
- Rheinkniebrücke

== Education ==
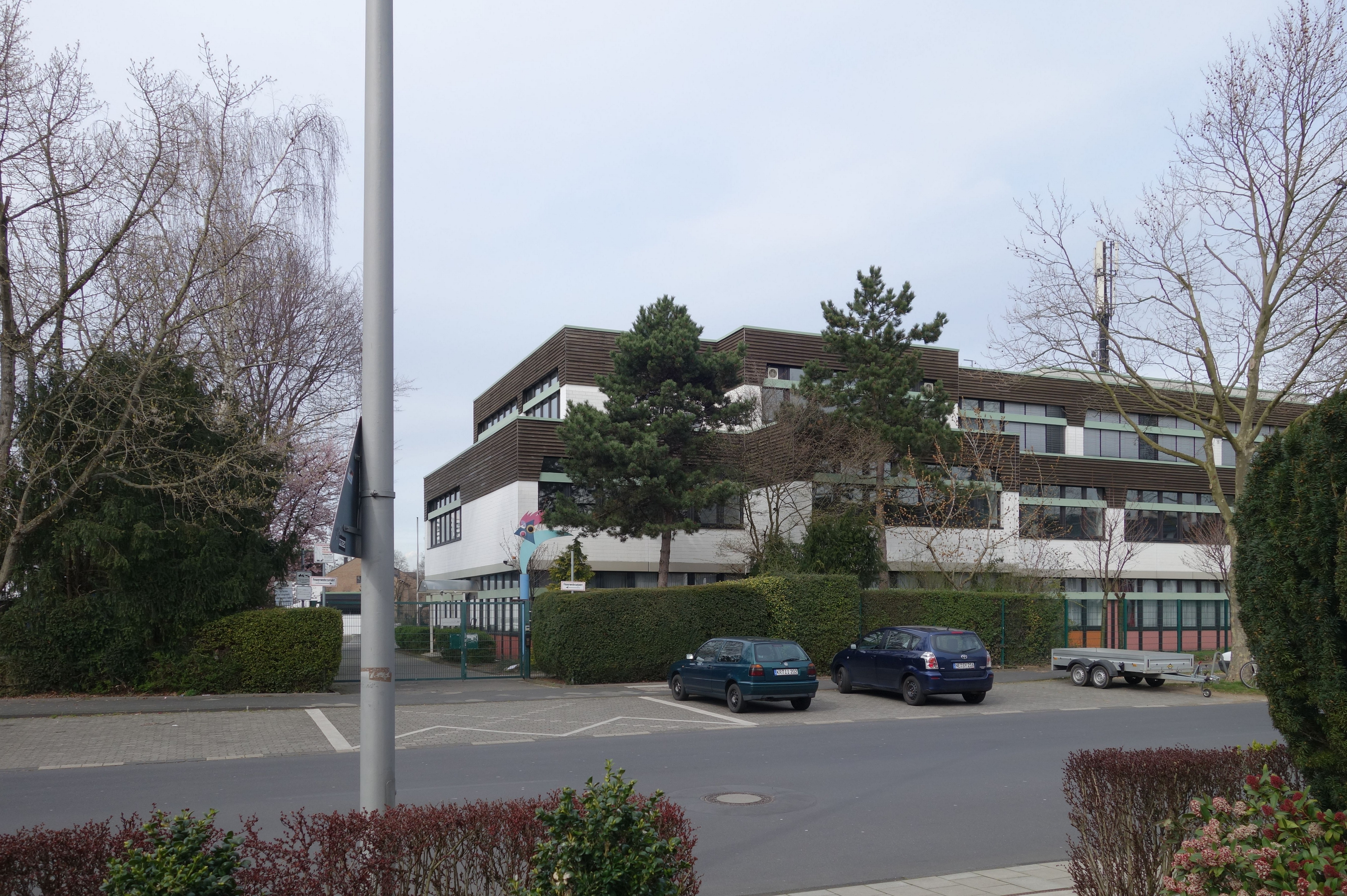
Japanische Internationale Schule in Düsseldorf

The Japanische Internationale Schule in Düsseldorf (JISD) first opened in a church building in Oberkassel on April 21, 1971, before moving to its permanent home in 1973. From 1983 to 2001 junior high school students of the JISD attended classes at the former Lanker School in Oberkassel.

== See also ==
- Boroughs of Düsseldorf
