= Japanese community of Düsseldorf =

Center for Japanese business activity in Germany

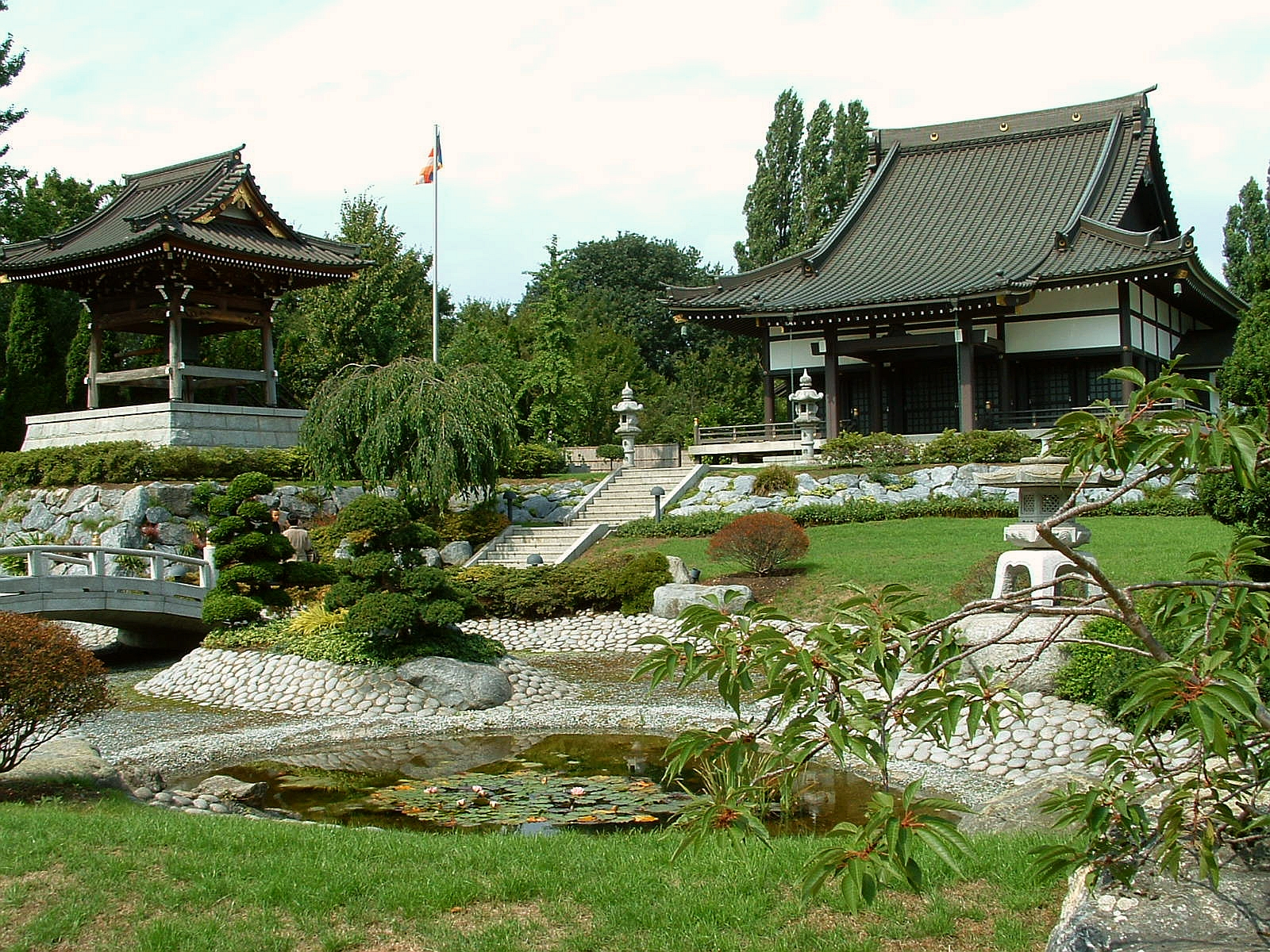
Eko House of Japanese Culture

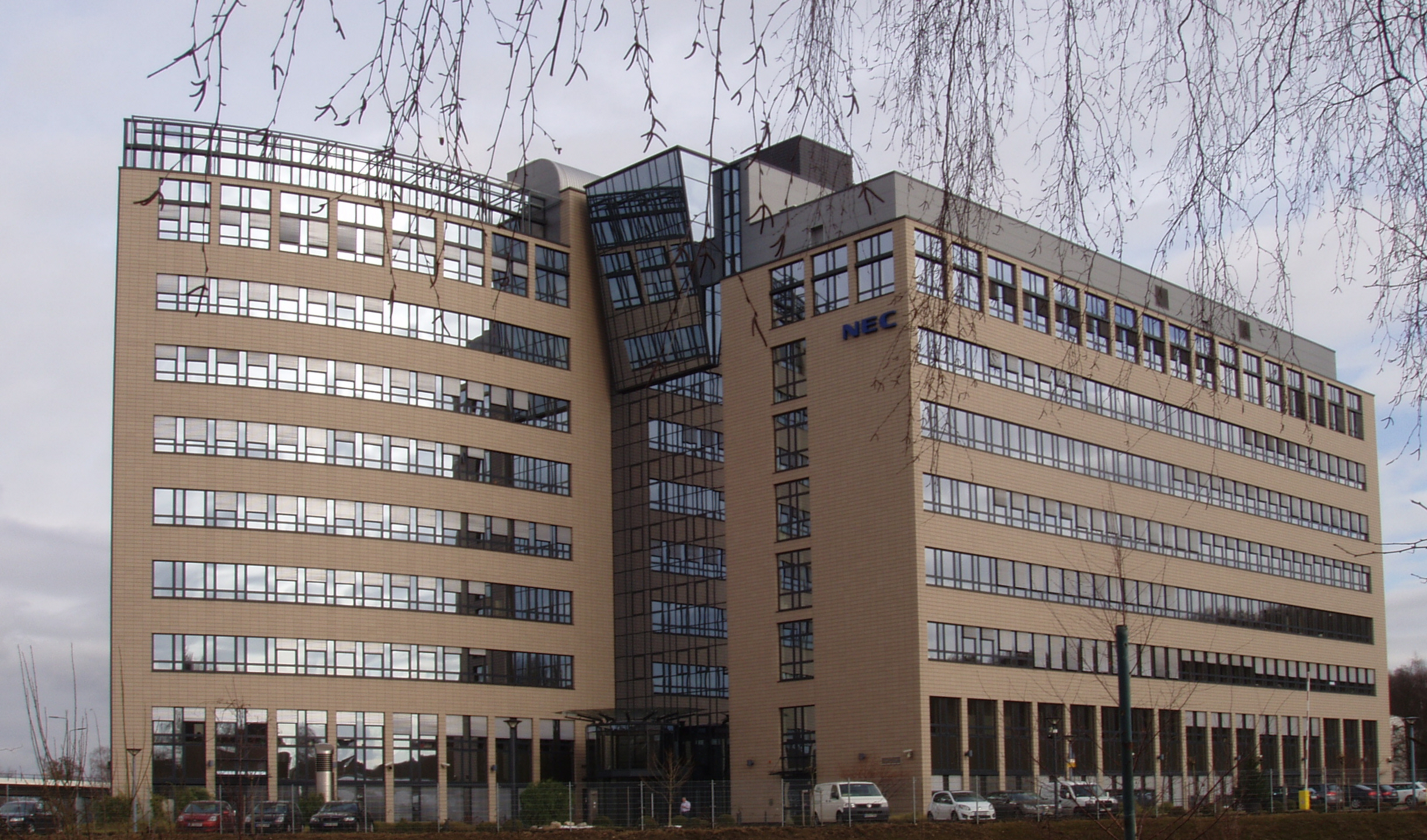
NEC Europe headquarters in Düsseldorf

There is a Japanese community in Düsseldorf, Germany. The city and its surrounding regions has hosted Japanese companies since the 1950s, and as of 2021 there are 636 Japanese-related companies in the state of North Rhine-Westphalia. Around 7,000 (2021) Japanese nationals live in its capital city Düsseldorf.

== History ==
In 1950 there was one Japanese person registered as living in Düsseldorf. Beginning in the mid-1950s, the Japanese companies returning to Germany in the post-World War II period were mostly settling in Düsseldorf, while in the pre-World War II period the Japanese population was concentrated in Hamburg. Arikawa stated that the Japanese settlement began when ten businesspersons from Tokyo, trying to buy metal ore and machinery for Japan, established their businesses in Düsseldorf. Due to this settlement, information about the Ruhr region circulated within Japanese companies. 300 Japanese were registered as living in the city by 1960. The Japanese Chamber of Commerce was founded in 1966. There were 100 Japanese companies in the Düsseldorf area in 1968.

Due to Düsseldorf's central location within Europe and proximity to other areas in Europe, its location in the Ruhr industrial area, and the proximity to the river port Duisburg, Japanese companies had a preference for Düsseldorf as they established European operations in the 1970s. By 1973 2,000 Japanese were registered as living in Düsseldorf and 200 Japanese companies were located in the area. By 1980 the number of Japanese companies had increased to 300. As of 1985 there were 6,000 Japanese residents. In 1990 there were 30 Japanese production facilities in the city. By 1992, 7,443 Japanese were registered as living in the city.

In 1985 the general manager of the Japanese Chamber of Commerce and Industry in Düsseldorf, Akira Arikawa, stated that of all of the cities in the world outside Japan, Düsseldorf had the highest concentration of Japanese residents.

Due to the reunification of Germany making Berlin the capital of the country, the decline in the Japanese economy, and the European Single Market causing Japanese companies to move to places with lower costs, since 1992 there had been a decline in the Japanese community. Many of the Japanese companies had shifted to the Netherlands. In the late 1990s the Düsseldorf area housed 520 Japanese companies. In 1999 about 4,500 Japanese people lived in and around Düsseldorf. By the late 1990s there were almost no Japanese production facilities in Düsseldorf, or in all of Germany. Due to the infrastructure and support from the Japanese community, including the Japanese school and the Buddhist centre, many companies that had moved out of Düsseldorf in the early 1990s, especially those that had moved to Berlin, began moving back to Düsseldorf by the late 1990s.

In 2001 Harold Kerbo and Patrick Ziltener, authors of the article "Japanese Business in Germany," wrote that "Dusseldorf remains the center for Japanese business activity in Germany."

== Geography ==
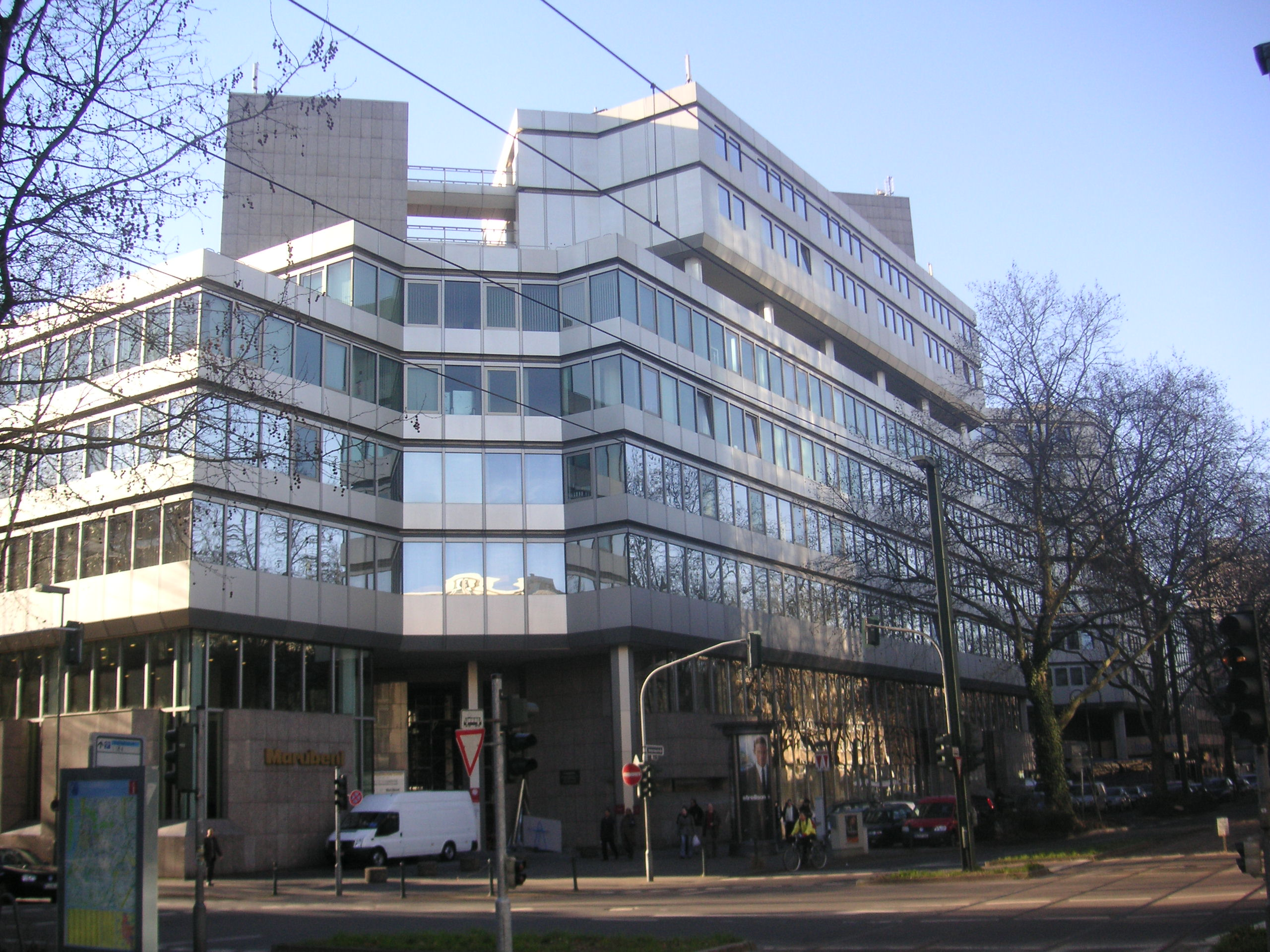
Japan Center Düsseldorf, including Hotel Nikko Düsseldorf to the right

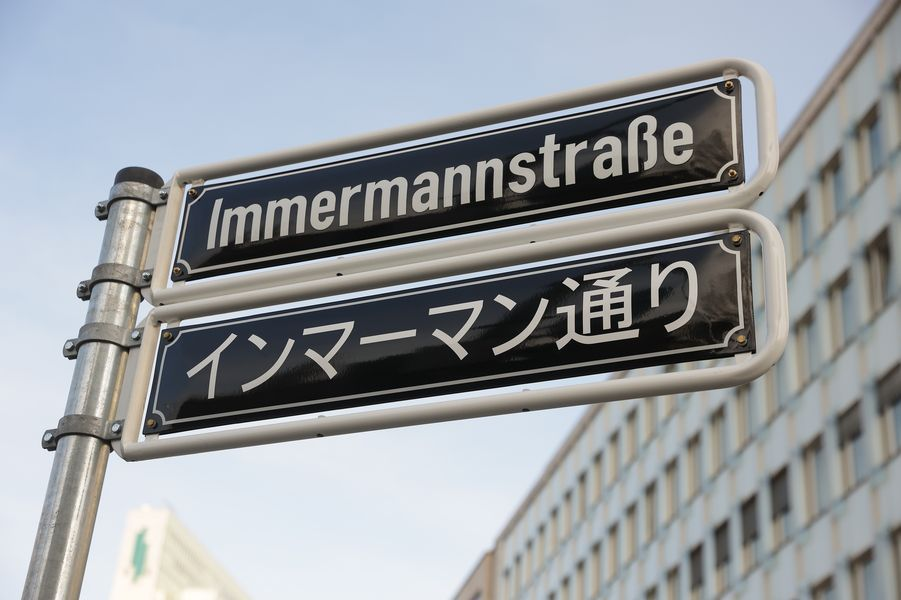
Since 2021 Immermannstraße (インマーマン通り, Inmāman Dōri) has bilingual (German/Japanese) street signs.

As of 1985 Immermann Street had a concentration of Japanese businesses. In 1985 Mark Heinrich of the Associated Press (AP) stated that the Hotel Nikko Düsseldorf on Immermann Street was the center of the Japanese community. Japan Airlines established the hotel in 1978. The Japanische Internationale Schule in Düsseldorf is located in Niederkassel, and it previously had a campus in Oberkassel.

The area around Immermann Street where Japanese offices and stores are concentrated is sometimes called "Little Tokyo", "Japantown", or "Klein-Tokio am Rhein" ("Little Tokyo on the Rhine").

== Media ==
In 1977 a weekly Japanese newspaper was established. Düsseldorf resident Tsunejiro Takagi was the publisher of Life in Europe, which was Europe's first Japanese language newspaper and as of 1985 had a circulation of 6,000. Its coverage included European Economic Community (EEC) developments, consumer news, a column on Japanese company representatives, area Japanese sports, and travel news.

== Economy ==
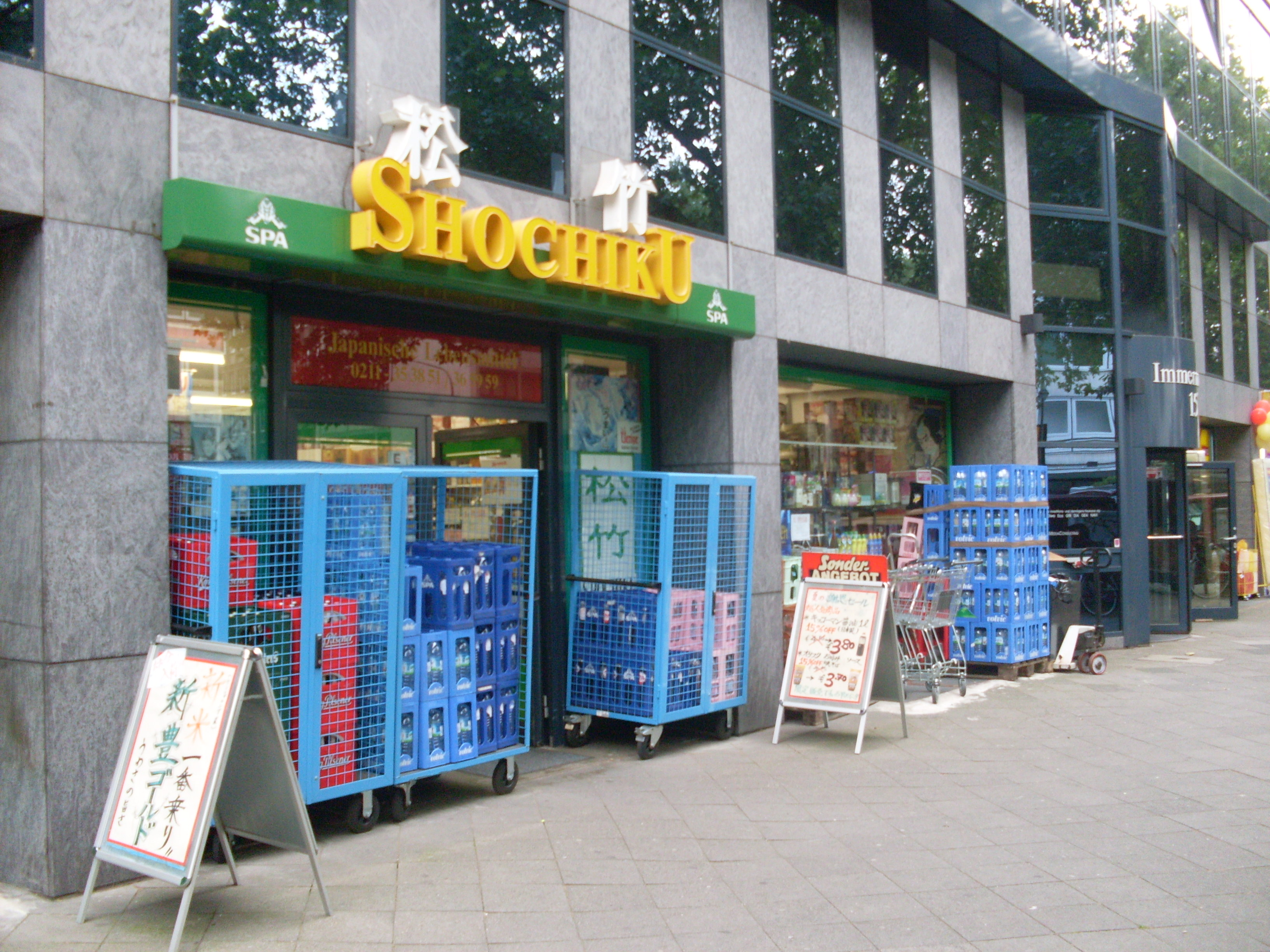
Shochiku (松竹, Shōchiku), a Japanese supermarket

As of 1985, 300 Japanese multinational companies operated in the Düsseldorf area and had invested over $600 million U.S. dollars in that area. As of that year, the multinationals included Mitsubishi and Nippon Steel.

As of the 2010s, about 421 Japanese companies had operations in the Düsseldorf area.

A selection of some Japanese companies in Düsseldorf: Sumitomo Deutschland GmbH (Industrial), Asahi Kasei Europe GmbH (Chemicals), Hitachi Europe GmbH (Electronic), Sompo International (Insurance), Daikin (Chemicals), Komatsu Germany GmbH (Industry), Tokio Marine Europe S.A., Düsseldorf (Insurance).

Düsseldorf is the most important location for Japanese financial institutions. Three of the biggest Japanese credit institutions have their German headquarters in the financial center Düsseldorf: MUFG Bank (Europe) N.V. Germany Branch, Sumitomo Mitsui Banking Corporation, Düsseldorf Branch, SMBC EU AG, Düsseldorf Branch and Mizuho Bank Ltd., Düsseldorf Branch. Furthermore, Chartered Investment Germany (CIG) is a German subsidiary of the Japanese securities trading bank PWM Japan Securities.

== Demographics ==
As of 1985 over 90% of ethnic Japanese households in West Germany had an affluent corporate executive as the head of the household. This executive often stays in Germany for three to five years.

As of 1985 company employees arriving in Germany often move into residences formerly occupied by those returning to Japan.

As of 2005 the Japanese population was about one third of that of London.

Japanese nationals:

- 7,961 (2008)
- 8,451 (2018)
- 7,144 (2021)

== Culture ==
Eric Zielke, a professor at University of Düsseldorf, stated around 1985 that Japanese often only interact with Germans when doing and being involved with business. He concluded that "the Japanese have no particular interest in becoming integrated into German society" because many are in Germany for only a three to five-year period, and that "The Japanese form a colony, remaining unobtrusive and keeping to themselves."

== Education ==
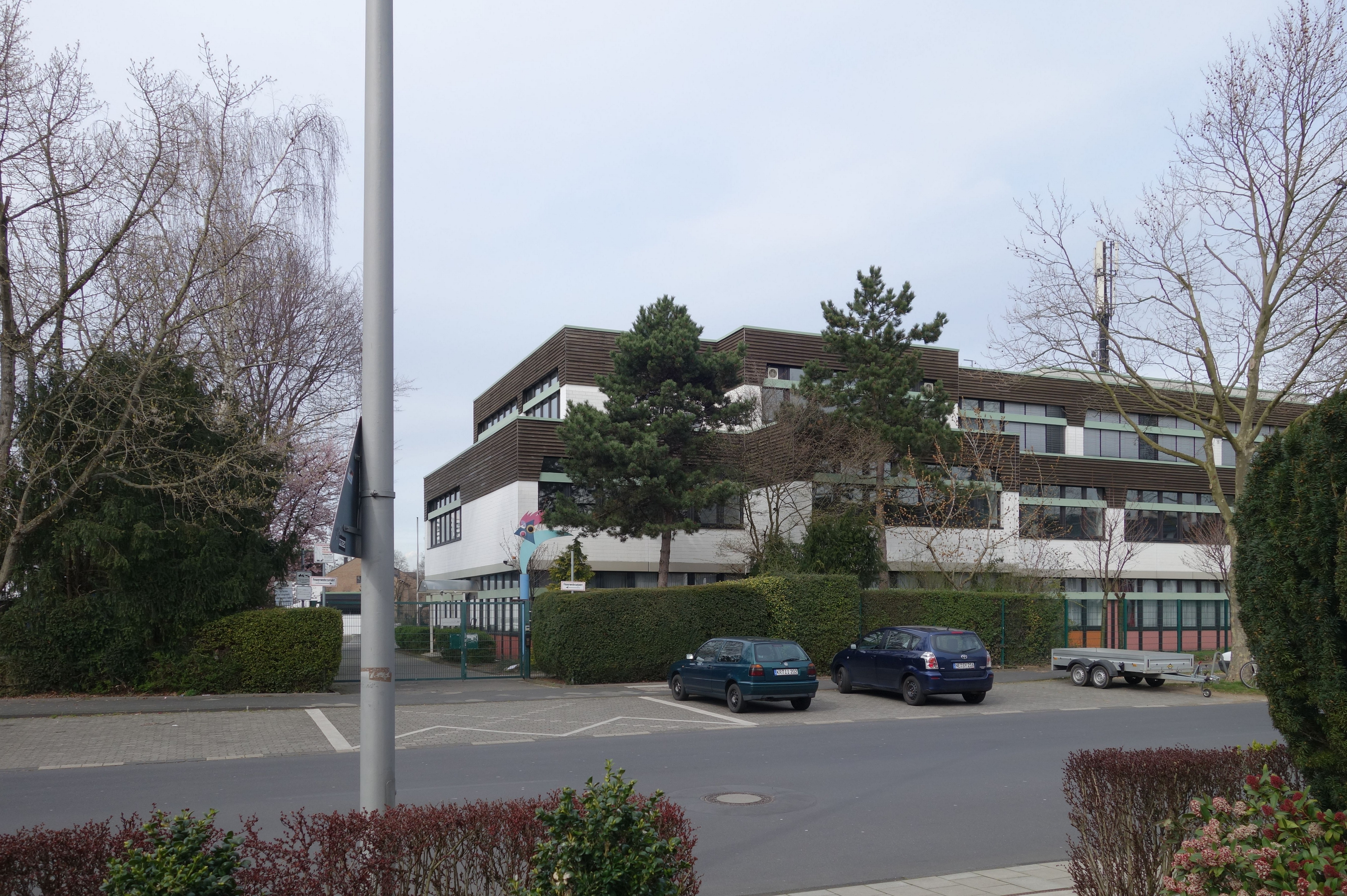
Japanische Internationale Schule in Düsseldorf

The Japanische Internationale Schule in Düsseldorf, a Japanese international school, is in Düsseldorf. It opened in 1971 and gained a permanent building in 1973. In 1985 the school had 880 students. The Japanische Ergänzungsschule in Düsseldorf (デュッセルドルフ日本語補習校 Dyuserudorufu Nihongo Hoshūkō), a Japanese weekend school, is a part of the institution.

== Transport ==
In the spring of 1985, Japan Airlines started a flight from Tokyo to Düsseldorf on a twice weekly basis.

In 2014 All Nippon Airways established a flight from Tokyo to Düsseldorf. Previously ANA had a dedicated shuttle bus from Düsseldorf to Frankfurt Airport so passengers may board ANA flights at the airport, but the bus service was discontinued after ANA began its Düsseldorf flights. The bus stopped at the Radisson Blu Scandinavia Hotel.

Starting from 2021 All Nippon Airways stopped providing direct flights from and to Düsseldorf.

== Institutions ==
The Consulate-General of Japan, Düsseldorf (在デュッセルドルフ日本国総領事館; Japanisches Generalkonsulat Düsseldorf) is located in the city.

== Recreation ==
The Japan Day in Düsseldorf is held annually.

== Notable residents ==
- Tetsuya Kakihara
- Blumio (Fumio Kuniyoshi)
- Erika Ikuta

== See also ==
- Japanese people in Germany
