= Grondmet =

Grondmet is a trading house involved in the distribution of raw materials and for the steel and foundry industries. The company is based in Düsseldorf-Oberkassel, Germany.

Grondmet was established in 1963 in Rotterdam in the Netherlands. Since the 1980s, the company is based in Germany. Grondmet is among the largest European importers and traders of Ferro-Molybdenum und Ferro-Tungsten. Other important products are Ferro-Vanadium, Tungsten Metal and Chrome Metal. The trading house is a specialized merchant of noble alloys and supplies steel mills, foundries and research facilities worldwide. In 2007, its turnover was approx. US$200 Million.
