= JISD =

JISD can refer to:

- Japanische Internationale Schule in Düsseldorf
- School districts in Texas abbreviated "JISD": List of school districts in Texas#J
