= Heerdt =

City district of Düsseldorf, Germany

Coordinates: 51°13′42″N 6°42′57″E

Heerdt (German pronunciation: [heːɐ̯t]) is one of the older quarters of the city of Düsseldorf, part of Borough 4. Heerdt and its neighbouring quarters Oberkassel, Niederkassel and Lörick lie on the left side of the river Rhine, opposite to the other districts of Düsseldorf and the central district. Heerdt has an area of 4.05 km^{2} (1.56 sq mi), and 12,395 inhabitants (2020).

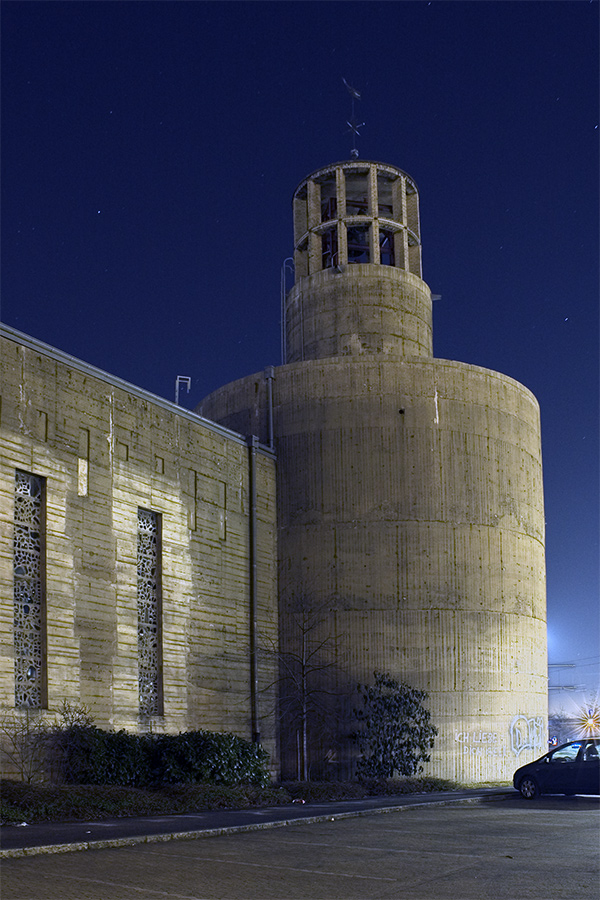
Saint Sakrament

Map of Düsseldorf, showing Heerdt (in red) within Borough 4 (in pink)

Heerdt is connected to the centre of the city by three bridges, the Oberkassler Brücke, the Rheinkniebrücke and the Theodor-Heuss-Brücke. Cars, bikes and pedestrians can use all bridges. The Oberkassler Brücke is used by some tram and underground lines running between the districts on both sides of the river. There is a direct connection to the motorway 52 heading to Krefeld and Mönchengladbach. The tram lines U70 and U76 connect Heerdt with Meerbusch and Krefeld (and the central districts, too), the line U75 with Neuss.

Heerdt was first mentioned in the 11th century. For centuries Heerdt was strongly connected to the neighbouring town of Neuss. From 1794 to 1814, Neuss was part of France during the reign of Napoleon. At the end of the 19th century the construction of the first permanent bridge between Düsseldorf and Heerdt changed things. Heerdt became industrialised. Until today the structure of Heerdt shows the era of industrialisation, but there are a lot of relics of the old Heerdt, especially the old churches.
