= Aleidis Raiscop =

German writer (1449-1507)

Aleidis Raiscop (also Reiscop, Raeskop; 1449 in Goch — 15 December 1507 at Rolandswerth monastery) was a German Benedictine nun and a writer. She is known for her philological and German-Latin translation capabilities.

From a young age, she was taught Latin — either at the grammar school in Goch, or at the grammar school in Uedem, which was funded by her great-uncle Heinrich Raiscop. She was a pupil of Bruder Benediktus von Maria Laach and at the age of 16 joined the Hagenbusch monastery in Xanten. Later, in 1467, she relocated as a master scholar to the monastery in Rolandswerth (now called Nonnenwerth). On 15 December 1507, she died based at the same monastery.

== Influence ==
During her life, she composed seven Latin homilies on Paul the Apostle, translated a German composition on the Mass into Latin, and became renowned as a writer of Classics at the monastery. Her particular talent was being able to compose perfect translations of German texts into Latin. Johannes Butzbach, a fellow Classics enthusiast, often praised Aleidis' works highly. His book from 1505 titled De illustribus mulieribus ("On Distinguished Women") was dedicated to her, in which he compares her to other Benedictine monks such as Hildegard of Bingen.

Raiscop was also one of the few nuns in the monastery at the time, and it has been suggested that exemplary skills marked a high point in perceptions of nuns at the time. Around this time, nuns began to accrue merit for their handicrafts and book copying.

In 1932, the town of Goch dedicated a street name to Raiscop (but spelled Reiscop), located between Gerbergstraße and Feldstraße.
