= Lörick =

City district of Düsseldorf, Germany

Coordinates: 51°14′47″N 6°43′40″E

Map of Düsseldorf, showing Lörick (in red) within Borough 4 (in pink)

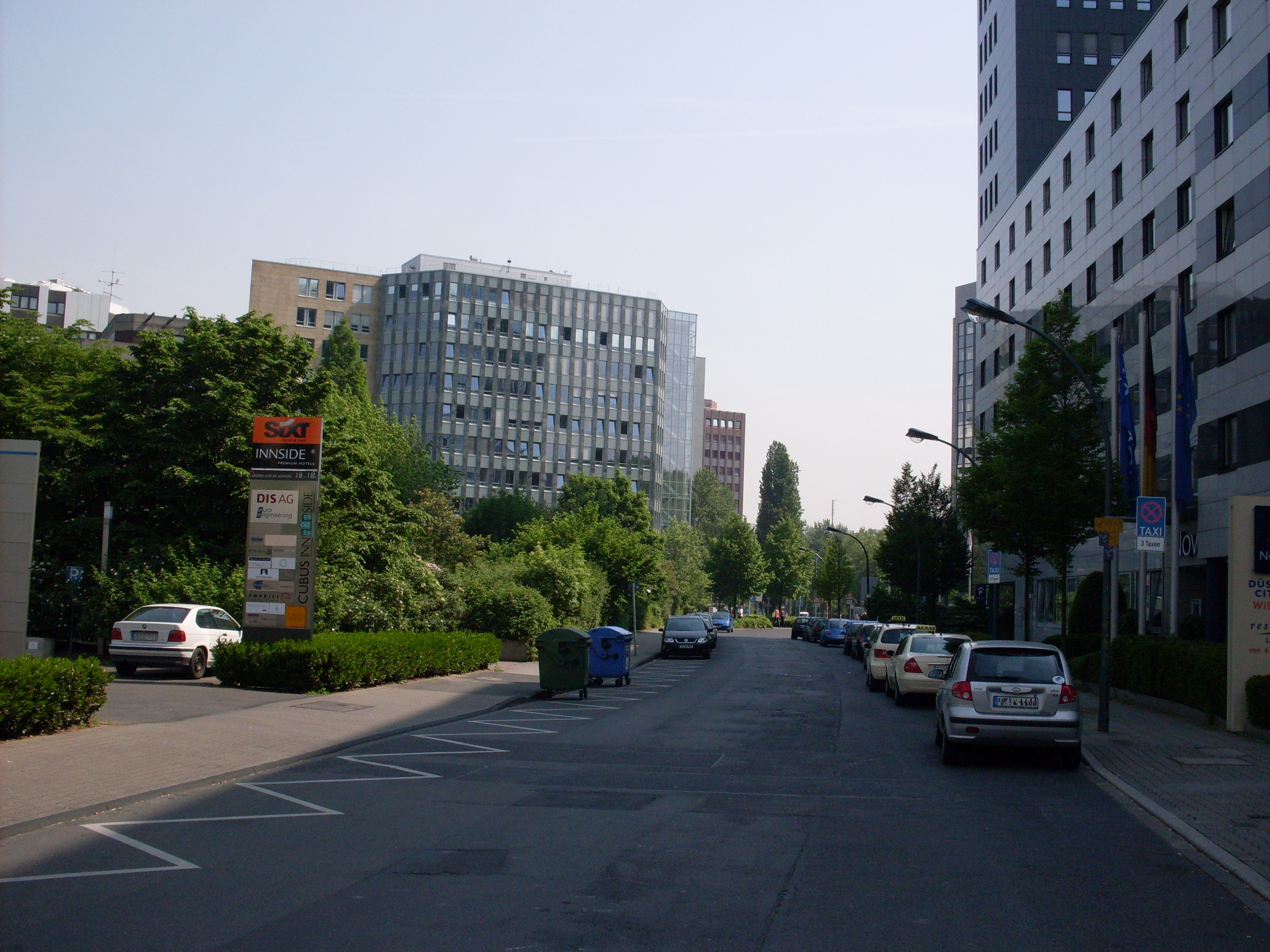
View of Lörick.

Lörick (German pronunciation: [ˈløːʁɪk]) is an urban quarter of Düsseldorf, Germany, part of Borough 4. It is located on the left side of the river Rhine, bordering to the river, Niederkassel, Heerdt and Meerbusch. It has an area of 2.55 km^{2} (0.98 sq mi), and 7,513 inhabitants (2020).

Lörick was a small village belonging to the office of Heerdt until there was a connection via the Oberkassel Bridge to Düsseldorf in 1898. In 1909 Lörick became, together with Heerdt, a part of Düsseldorf. Lörick became a typical suburb.

In 1957 the North Bridge of Düsseldorf (Theodor-Heuss-Brücke) was opened, creating a direct connection of Lörick with Düsseldorf (not only via Oberkassel). In 1960 the skyscraper complex "Seestern" ("Starfish") was built in Lörick. It continued to grow until the 1990s. In 1961 an open-air bath opened in Lörick.
