= Japan Day in Düsseldorf =

Cultural festival in Düsseldorf, Germany

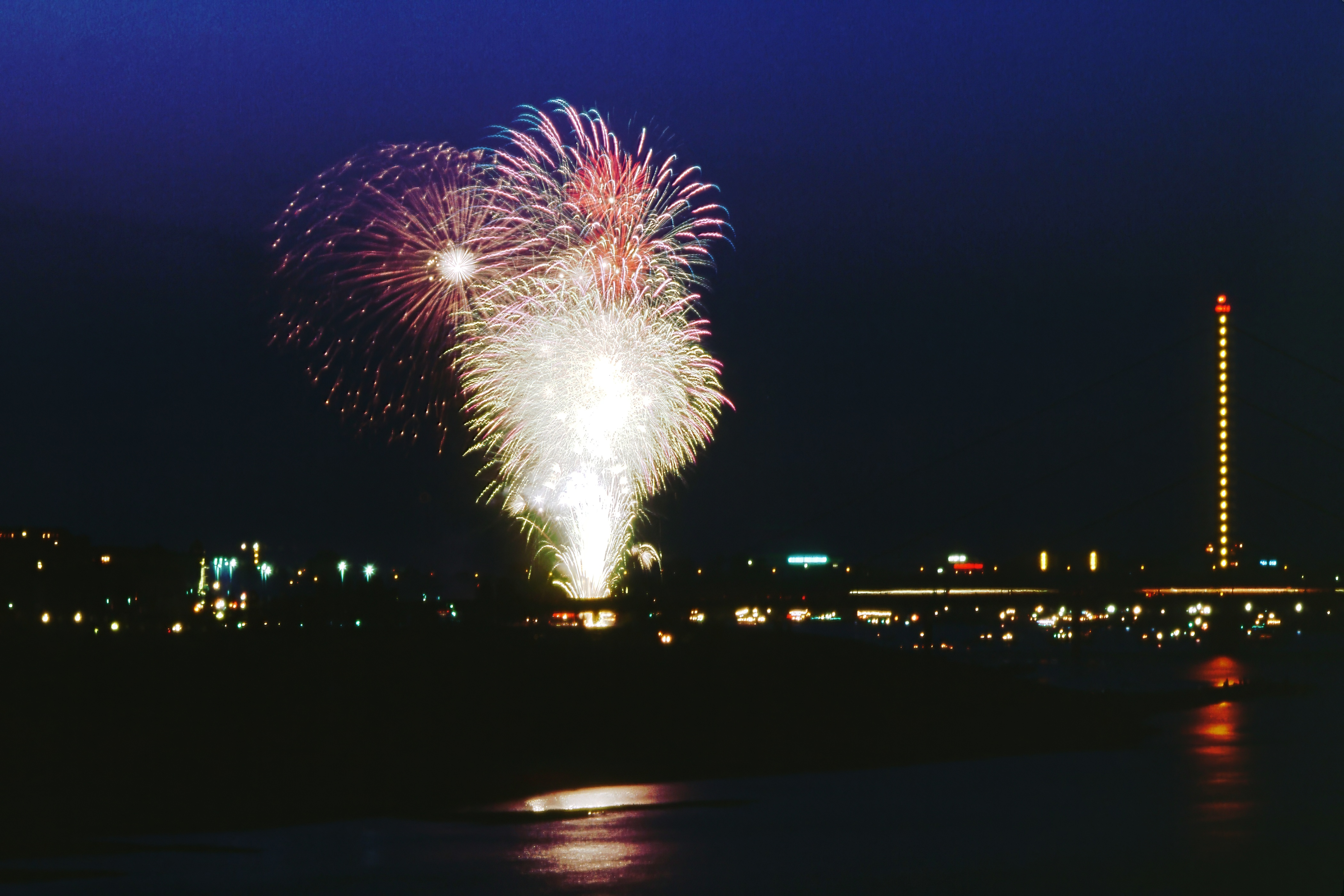
Fireworks of the 1983 Japan Week, the precursor of the Japan Day

Japan Day (Japanese: 日本デー; German: Japan-Tag Düsseldorf/NRW) is a Japanese festival which is celebrated every year in Düsseldorf, Germany. It is the largest Japanese culture and encounter festival in Europe. In 2025 it was held on 24 May.

== Amount ==
600,000 people joined the festival in 2013. In 2025, according to The Laotian Times, around 380,000 visitors celebrated the festival.

== History ==
=== Cancellations ===
For the first time since its inception, the 2020 Japan Day event scheduled for 16 May was canceled with no plans for a postponed event to take place later in the year due to the COVID-19 pandemic. It was expected to resume as normal by the next planned event, taking place on 29 May 2021, but that was also cancelled, in favour of returning in May 2022. As an alternative, there were a series of smaller Japan Day events in its place that were organised later that year, most of them online.

=== Post-Pandemic ===
Japan Day returned in full on 21 May 2022, as well as 13 May and 1 June on the following years, with an estimated 630,000 attendees and visitors in 2024.

An extension to a Japan Week is planned for 24 May 2025.

Japan Day will return on 23 May 2026 with a firework spectacle at the end.

== Gallery ==
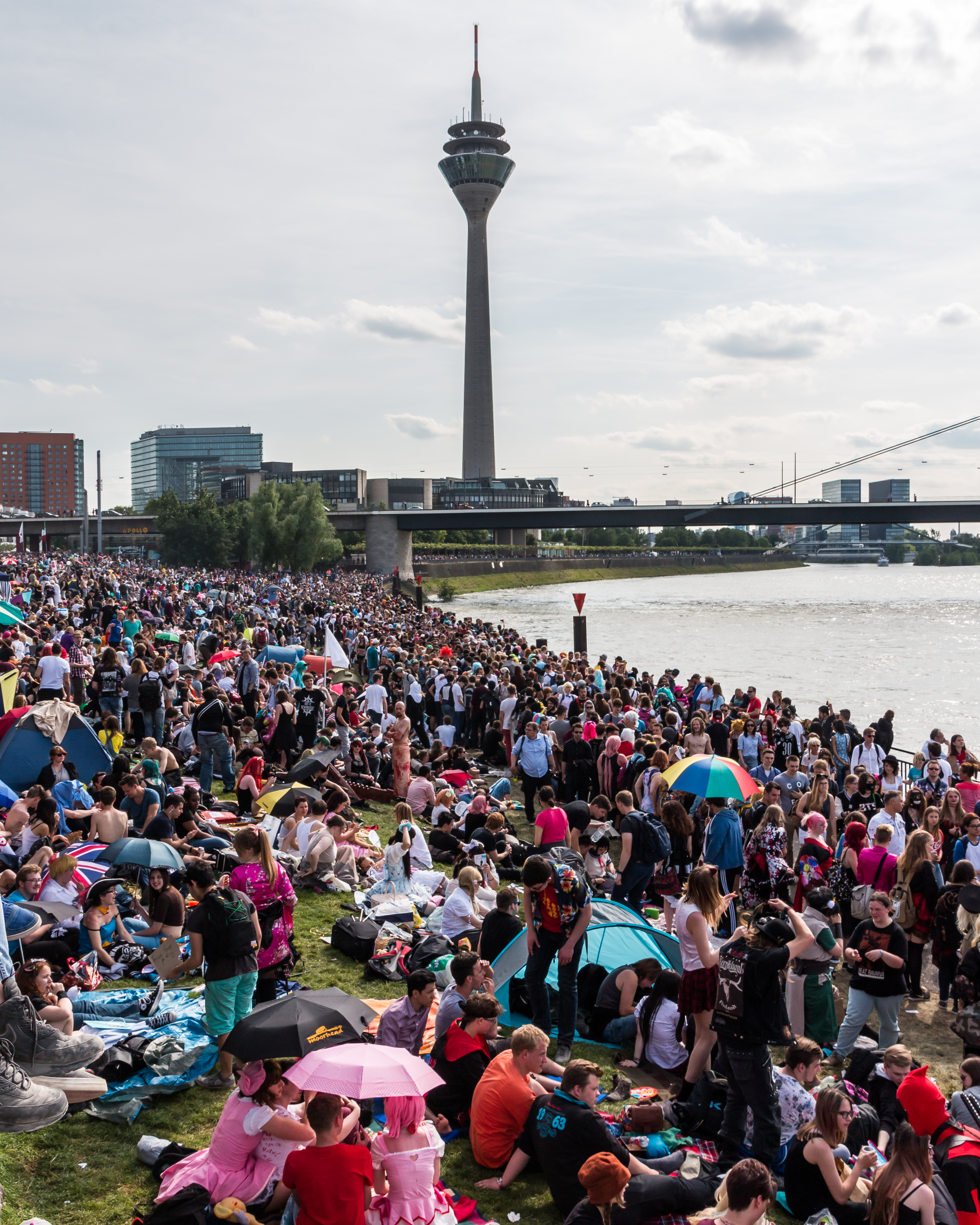
Japan Day 2016

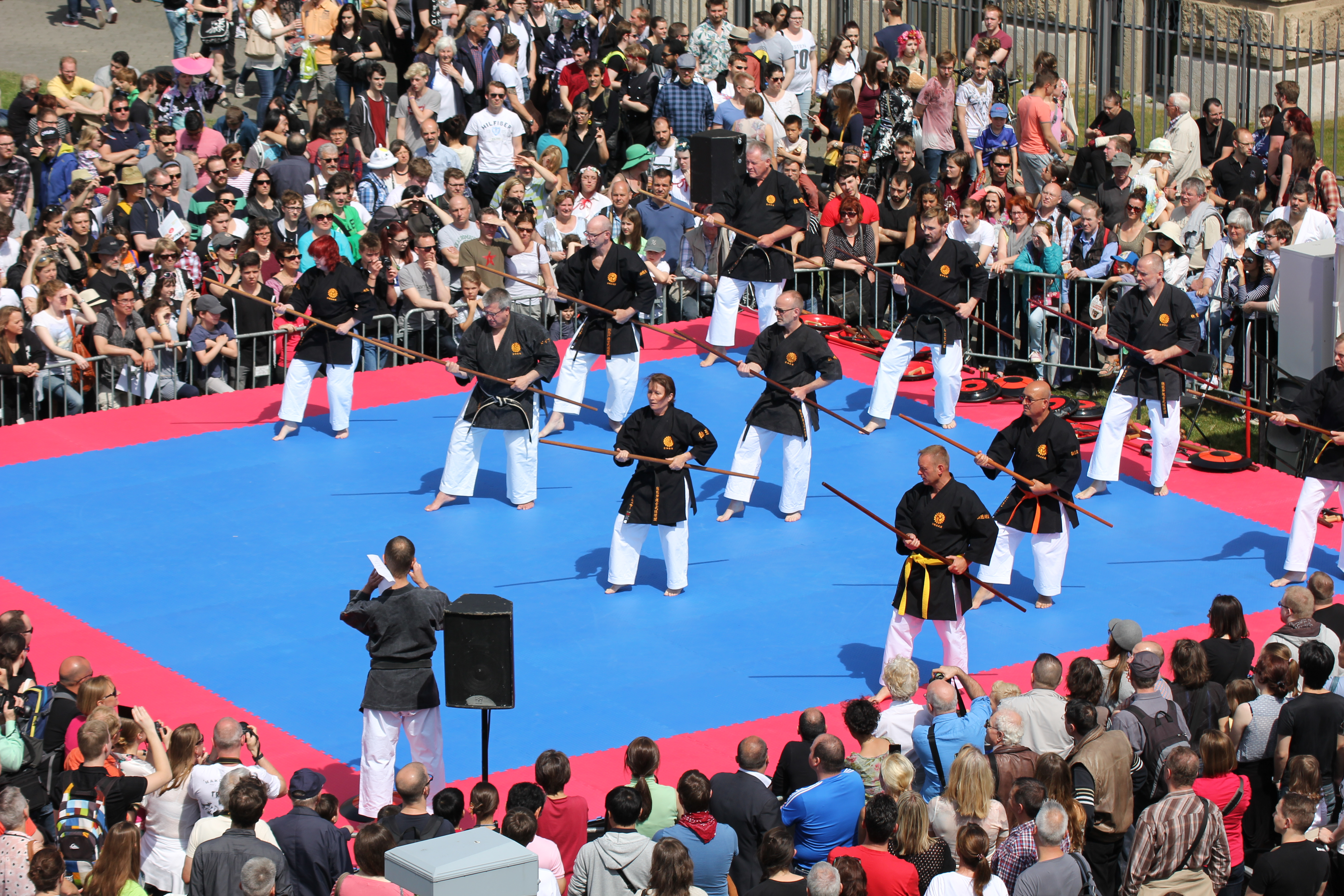
Martial arts show 2016

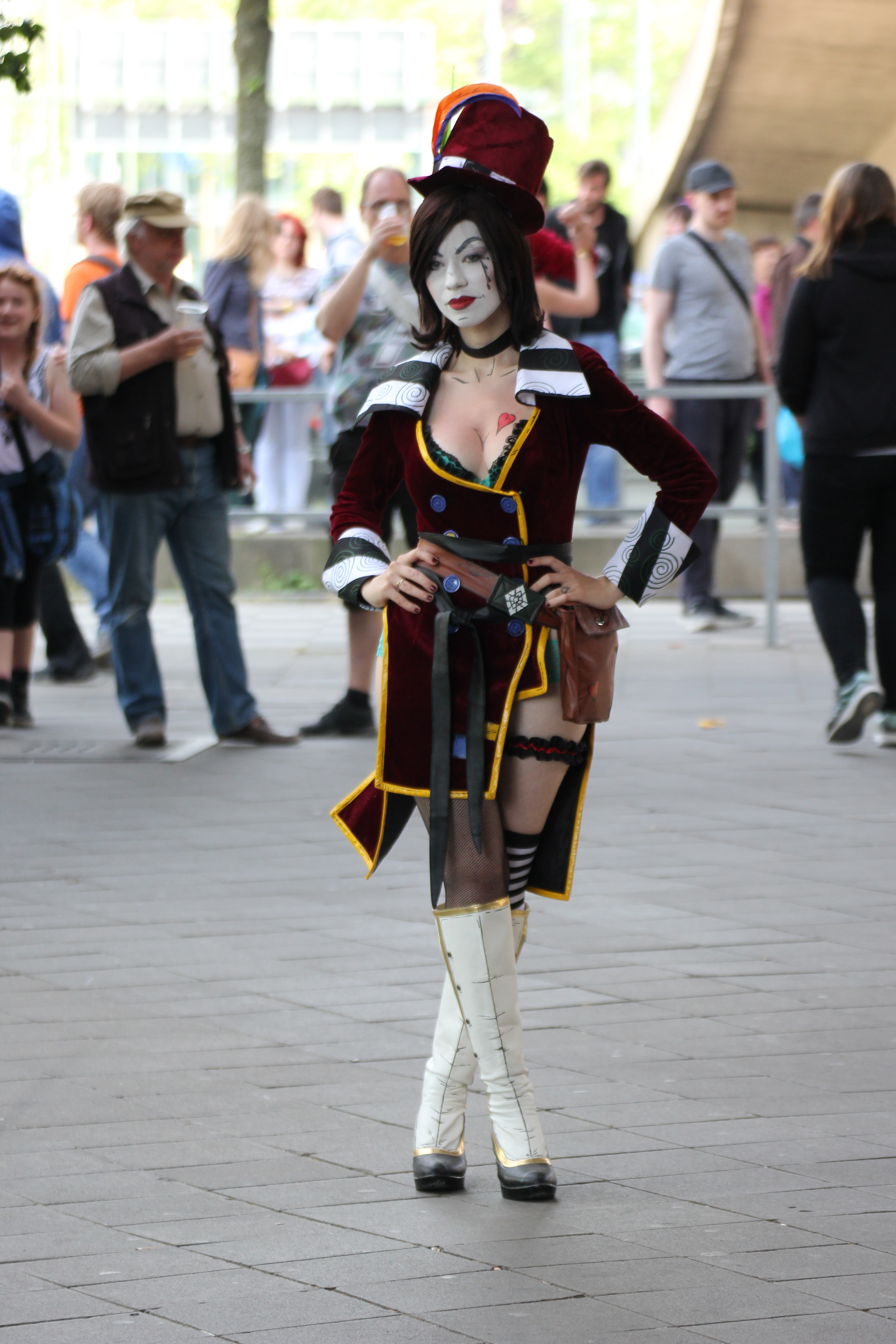
Cosplay in 2016

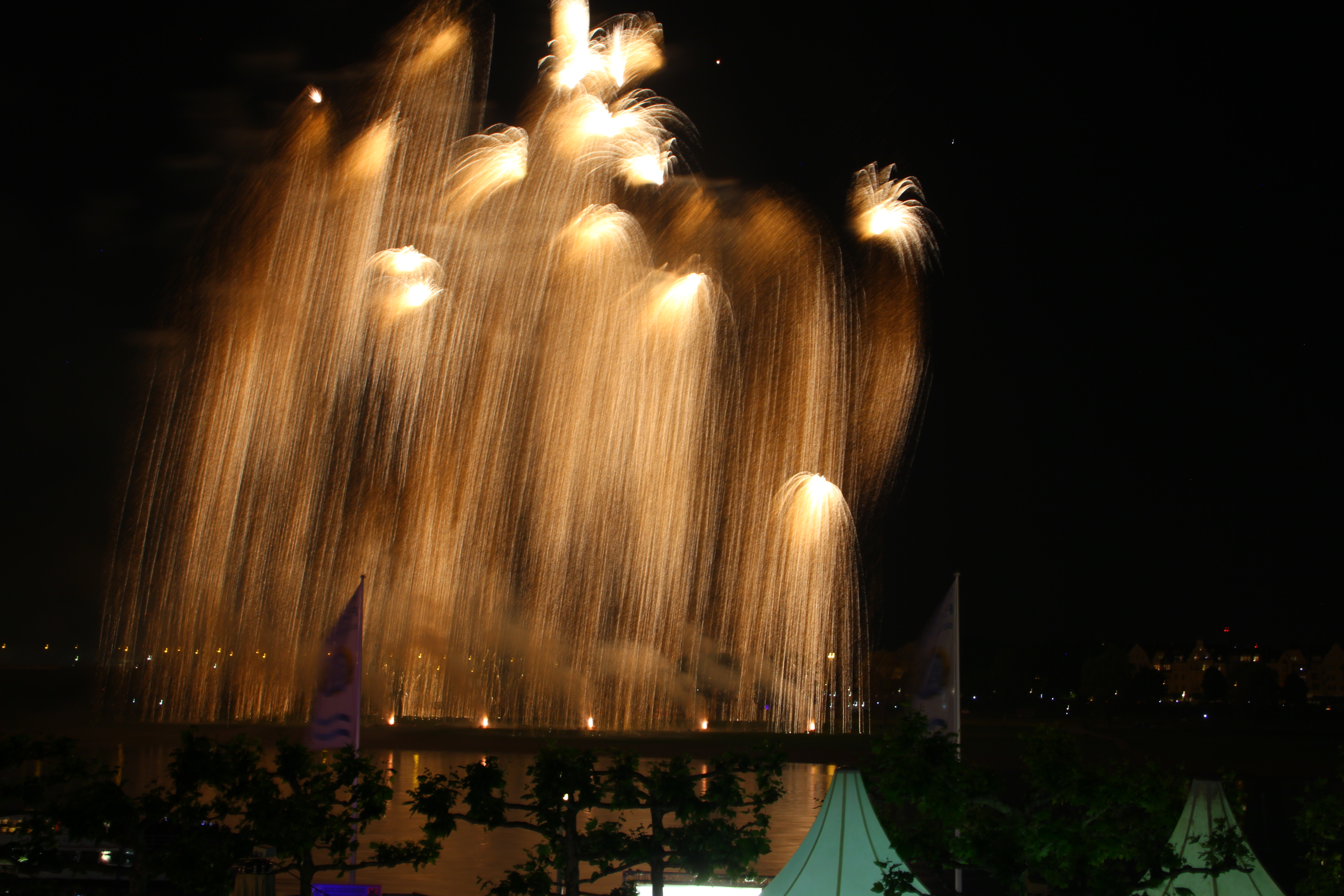
Fireworks in 2014

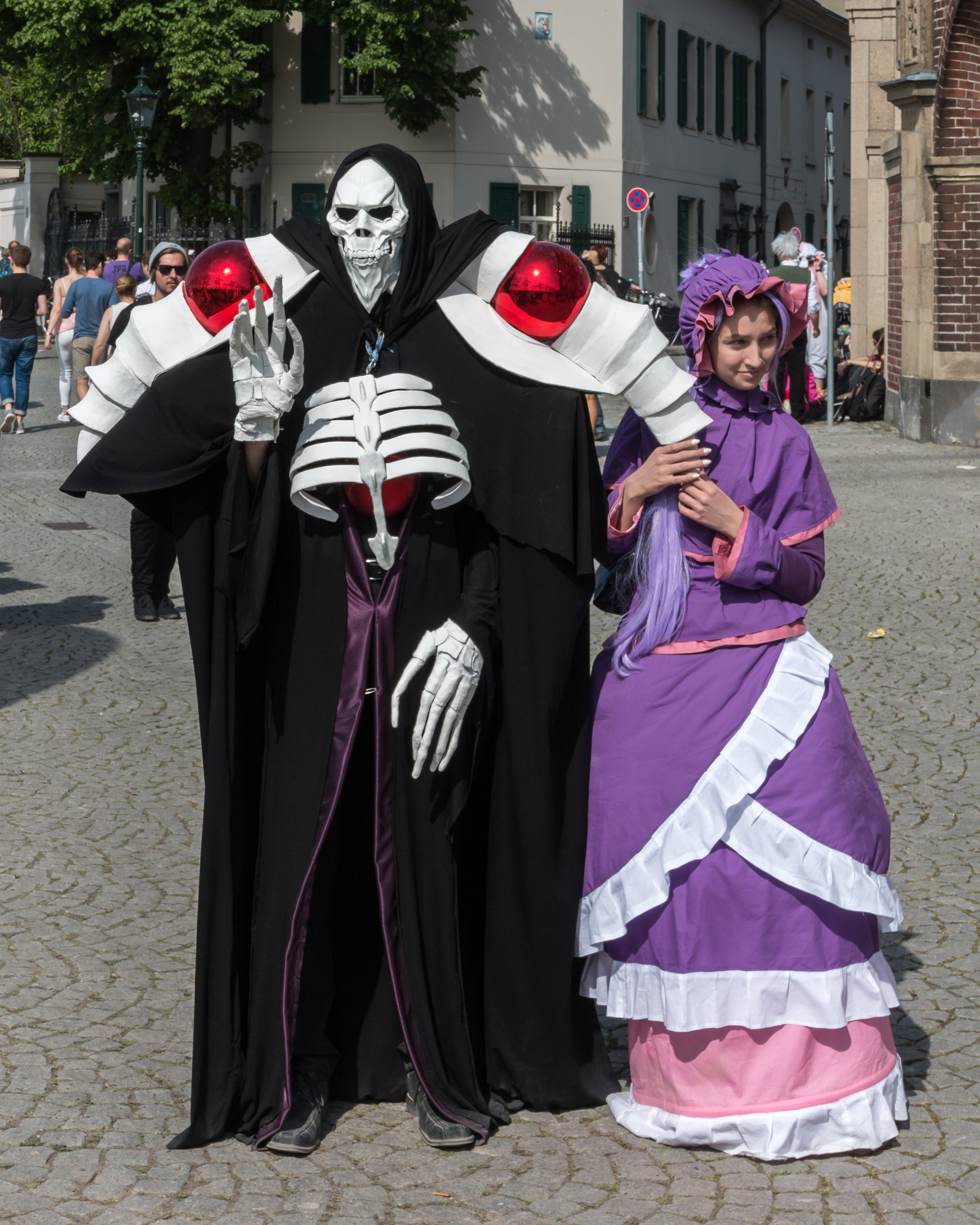
2016 cosplayers

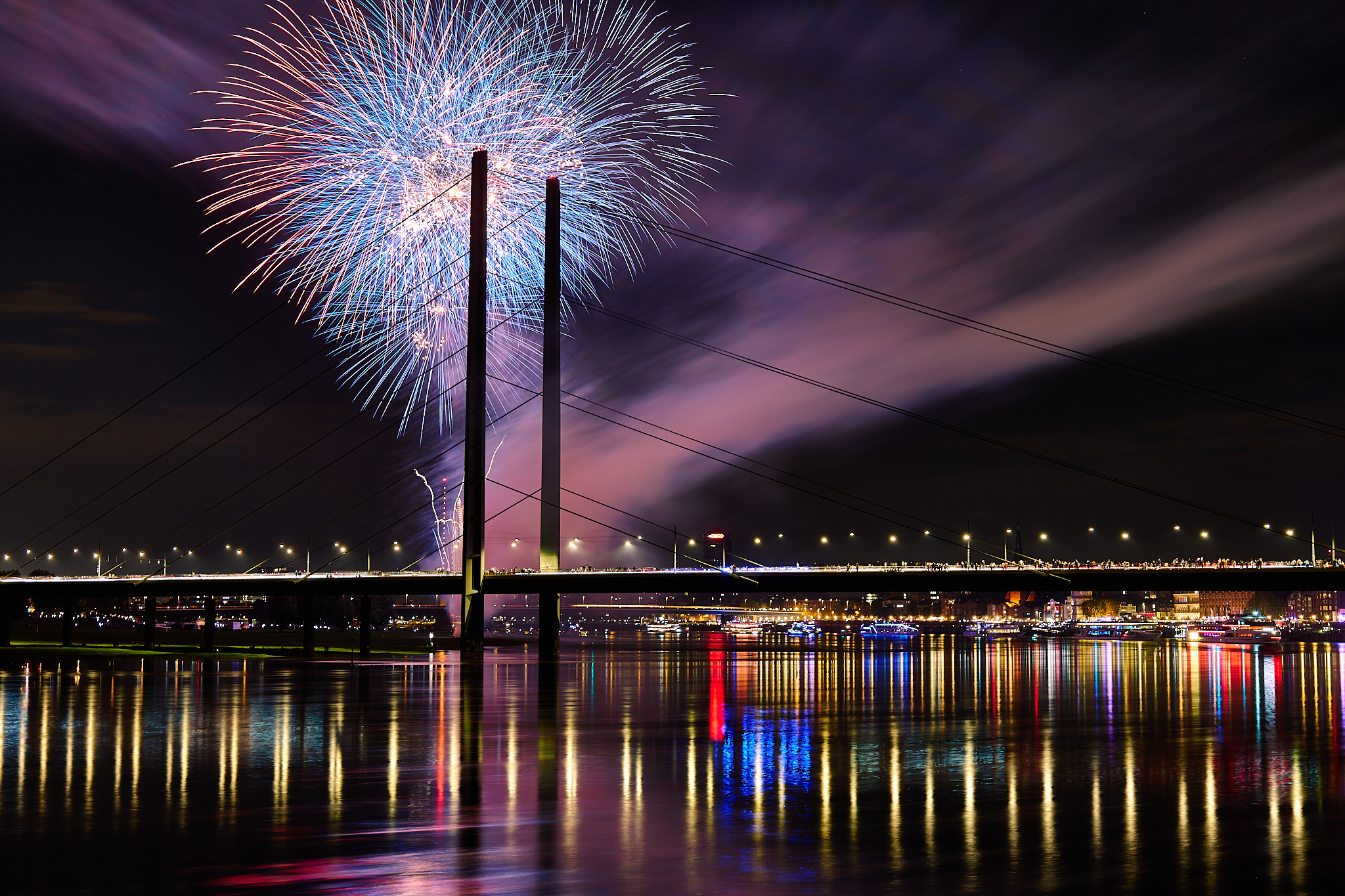
2023 fireworks

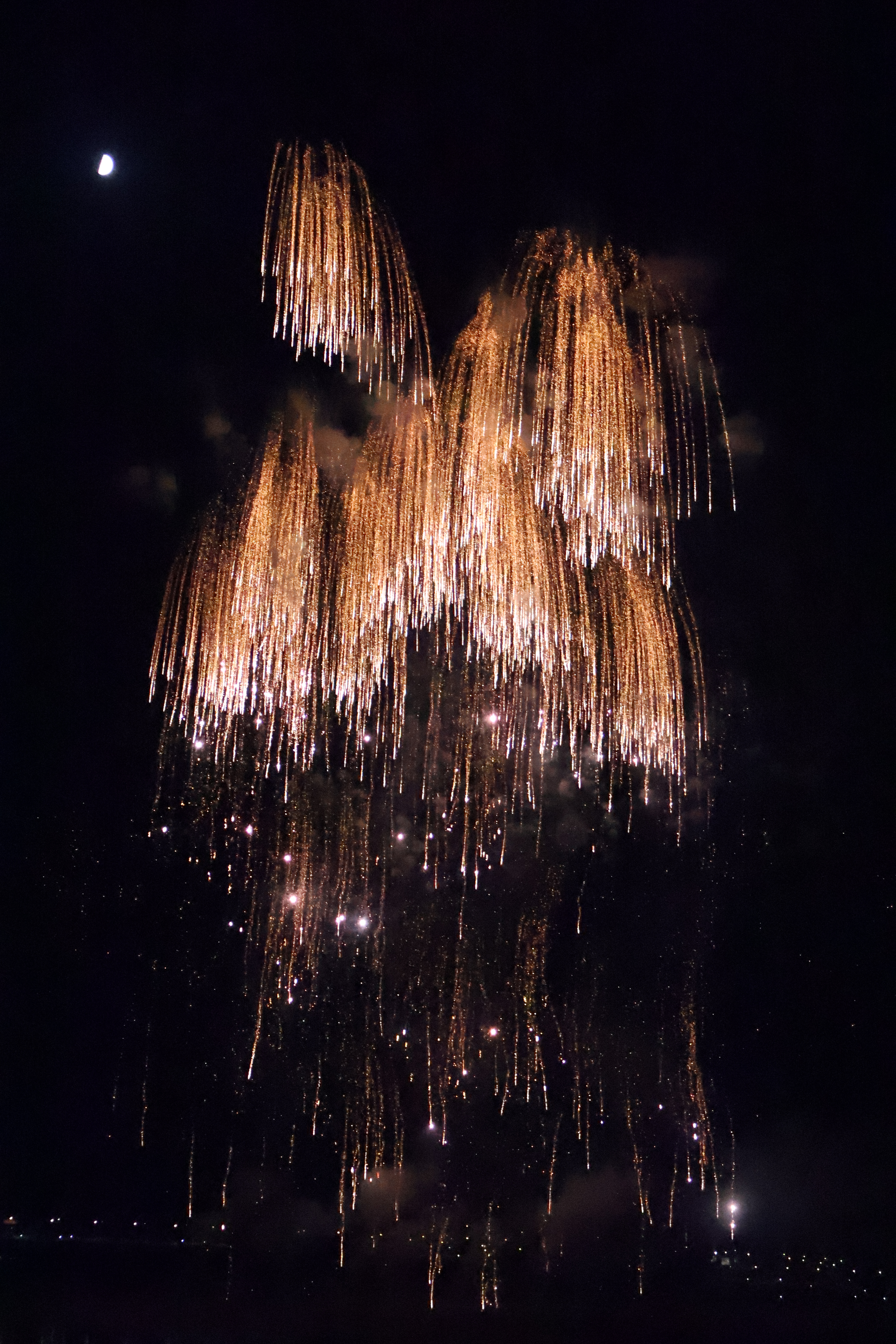
2026 fireworks

== See also ==
- Japanese community of Düsseldorf
- Japanische Internationale Schule in Düsseldorf
