= Blumio =

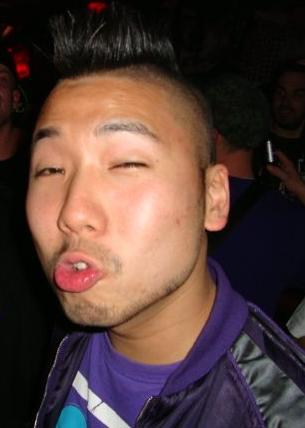
- Blumio in 2011

Background information
- Born: Fumio Kuniyoshi; 16 February 1985 (age 41); Hilden, West Germany
- Genres: Hip hop
- Occupation: Rapper
- Labels: L Records, Japsensoul

Fumio Kuniyoshi (国吉 史生, Kuniyoshi Fumio; born 16 February 1985) is a German rapper of Japanese descent known as Blumio. His 2005 single "Meine Lieblingsrapper" debuted at number 2 on the German Urban TRL charts.

== Early life and career ==
Kuniyoshi was born 1985 in Hilden, a town located near Düsseldorf, home to the largest Japanese community in Germany. Inspired by the American rapper Ice-T, Blumio began, at the age of 14, to write his own rap lyrics.

In 2002, he applied for an MC contest with a cassette. After an Internet vote, Blumio won the contest, beating many contestants, among them Berlin rapper Taichi. Following that, Blumio drew the attention of music producer Don Tone. Don Tone invited him to his studio in Düsseldorf, where Blumio came in contact with several notable German rappers, including Eko Fresh and the Aggro Berlin rappers.

In 2005, Blumio made his breakthrough with his single "Meine Lieblingsrapper", in which he imitates notable German rappers, such as Massiv, Jan Delay and Azad. Rapper Sido, who had not been imitated by Blumio, provided additional vocals for the song.

In December 2008, Blumio released the album "Rush Hour" in collaboration with the "BTM-Squad" member Habesha. The work was the first release on Blumio's label "Japsensoul". His second LP, "Yellow Album" appeared in June 2009. This was followed in September 2010 by his third album, "Tokio Bordell". The singles "Eberhard" and "Die Welt ist schwul" were taken from it.

In 2016, Blumio moved to Tokyo, Japan, where he currently resides. His first Japanese single "UNIQLO" was released on YouTube on 3 August 2017.

== Discography ==
=== Albums ===
- 2004: I Love Deutschrap (Mix CD)
- 2008: Rush Hour (with Habesha)
- 2009: Yellow Album
- 2010: Tokio Bordell
- 2011: Yellow Album Reloaded
- 2012: Drei
- 2015: Blumiologie
- 2018: Demo

=== Singles ===
- 2007: Meine Lieblingsrapper (Maxi Single)
- 2009: Rosenkrieg (featuring Zemine)
- 2009: Antigewaltsong
- 2009: Hey Mr. Nazi
- 2009: H.D.G.D.L
- 2009: Intro
- 2010: Lass mal über Haie Reden
- 2011: Wir träumen gemeinsam von besseren Tagen (E-Single)

=== Videos ===
- 2009: Antigewaltsong
- 2009: Rosenkrieg
- 2009: Hey Mr. Nazi
- 2009: H.D.G.D.L.
- 2010: Lass mal über Haie reden
- 2010: Ich mag dich irgendwie
- 2012: Der letze Samurai
- 2012: Wir träumen gemeinsam von besseren Tagen
- 2017: UNIQLO
