= Largest Fair on the Rhine =

Fair in Düsseldorf, Germany

Coordinates: 51°13′40″N 6°45′48″E

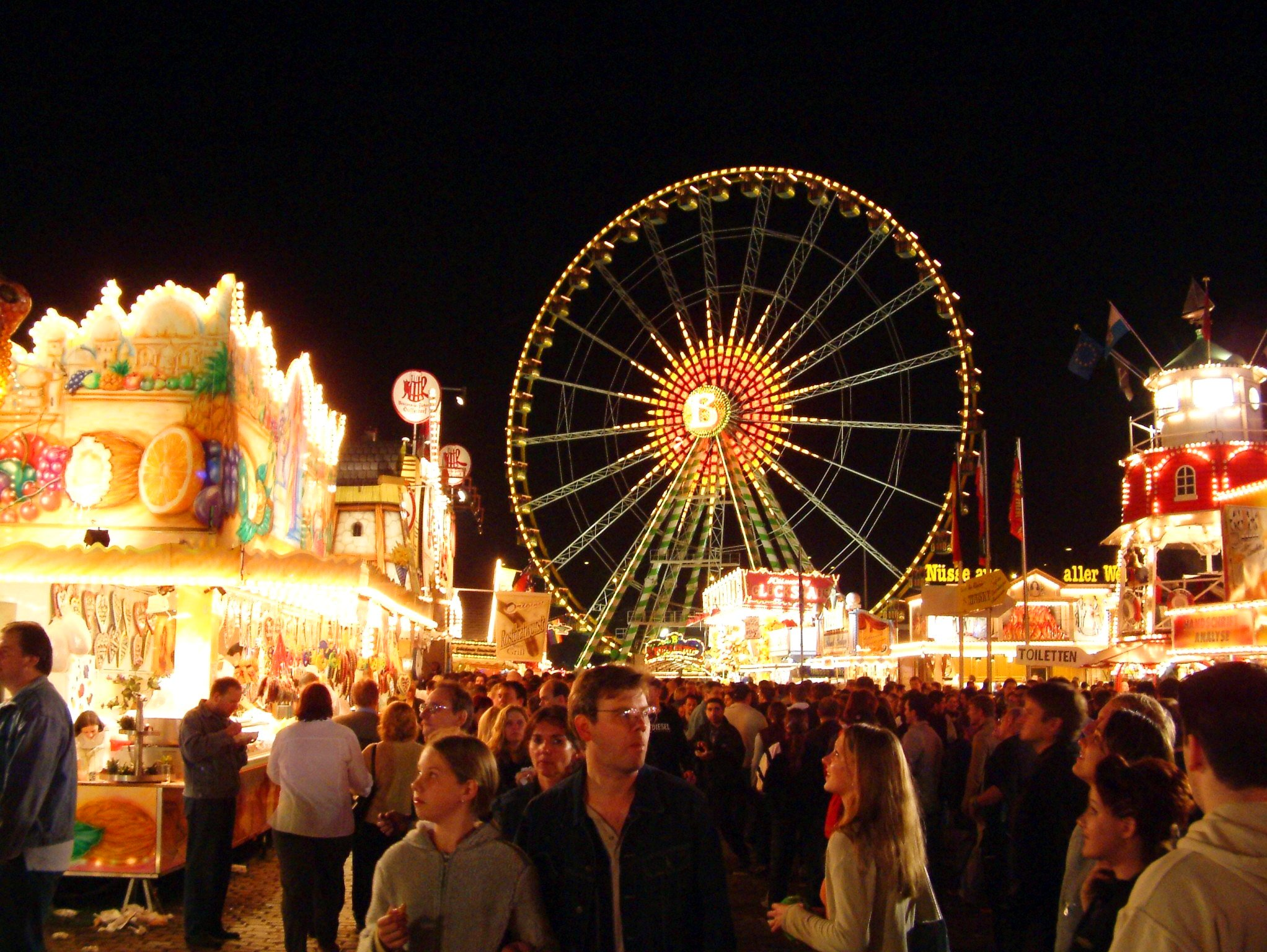
Fair in 2002

The Largest Fair on the Rhine (German: Größte Kirmes am Rhein) is a fair in Düsseldorf, one of Germany's largest. It takes place the third week in July on the left bank of the Rhine River, in the district Düsseldorf-Oberkassel, and features beer and food tents, amusement park rides, and vendors.

== History ==
The Largest Fair on the Rhine has its roots in an annual celebration in honor of the city's patron saint Apollinaris of Ravenna and the sanctification of the “Basilika St. Lambertus”, the main catholic church in Düsseldorf's Old Town.

The celebration of both events took place first in 1435. At the time it was organized by the local St. Sebastianus shooting club around a traditional shooting competition (called Schützenfest – marksmen festival), a local annual tradition involving a wooden target on a pole, usually a representation of an eagle. In the 16th century, the fair was said to be an occasion for King Henry VIII” to introduce his future wife Anna van Kleve to the public.

In 1910, the fair was moved to its present location, the fairgrounds on the left Rhine river bank in Düsseldorf's district Oberkassel overlooking the city's historic Old Town. Since then, the format and focus of the fair have changed significantly into the more secular and entertainment-oriented event it is today. Attendee numbers rose dramatically, and the event was stretched into 9 days. The name of the event developed in the 1970 simply into “Largest Fair on the Rhine” and has stuck since then. It is not only Germany's fourth-largest fair but also one of the most important events for Düsseldorf's economy.
