= Rheinkniebrücke =

Bridge

Rhine knee bridge Rheinkniebrücke
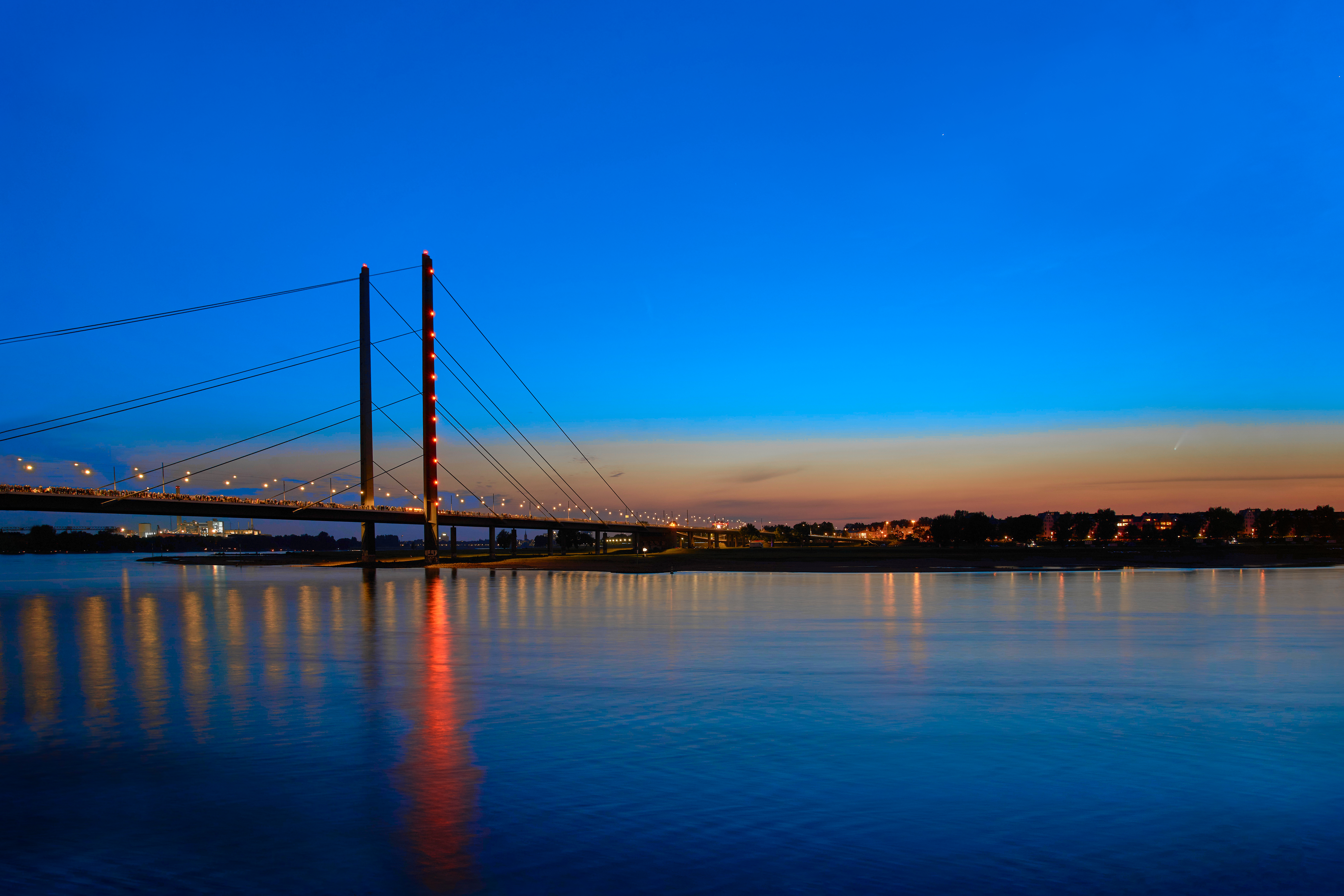
- Coordinates: 51°13′15″N 6°45′51″E
- Locale: Düsseldorf, Germany
- Official name: Rheinkniebrücke
- Other name: Rhine knee bridge
- Named for: the location at the Rhine knee

Characteristics
- Total length: 1519 m
- Width: 28.9 m
- Height: 3.4 m
- Traversable?: yes
- Towpaths: yes

History
- Construction cost: € 212.1 million
- Opened: 16 October 1969

Location
- Interactive map of Rhine knee bridge

The Rheinkniebrücke (English: Rhine knee bridge) is a cable-stayed bridge leading over the Rhine at the Rheinknie in Düsseldorf with a six-lane motor road and two combined pedestrian and cycle paths, which was opened to traffic on 16 October 1969.

== History ==
The decision to build the bridge was made in 1962. The architect Friedrich Tamms was entrusted with the development of the project. Fritz Leonhardt was appointed chief engineer. The bridge was built in 1965 by Deutsche Maschinenbau-Aktiengesellschaft (Demag AG), Gutehoffnungshütte, Aktienverein für Bergbau und Hüttenbetrieb and Hein, Lehmann & Co.. The bridge was commissioned on 16 October 1969. At the time of its opening, it was a cable-stayed bridge with the longest span in the world.

== Location ==
The bridge connects the Düsseldorf districts of Unterbilk and Oberkassel. The bridge got its name from its location.

== See also ==
- List of bridges in Germany
