= Nonnenwerth =

Island of the river Rhine, Germany

Coordinates: 50°38′N 7°13′E

Nonnenwerth (formerly also Rolandswerth) is an island in the river Rhine in Germany between Rolandseck and Bad Honnef (at river kilometer 642) opposite the island of Grafenwerth. The island has been the site of a monastery with interruptions since the beginning of the 12th century, was originally founded by the Benedictines and taken over by the Franciscans in 1854. Since then, the monastery has also been home to a Franciscan educational institution, which began as a girls' boarding school and later became a general high school.

== Geography ==
The island of Nonnenwerth is around two kilometers long and almost 180 meters wide at its widest point. The main part with the monastery and school facilities is located in the area of the city on the left bank of the Rhine in Remagen in the Rhineland-Palatinate district of Ahrweiler. Within Remagen, the main part with the residential area Insel Nonnenwerth belongs to the Rolandswerth district, the southern part at Rolandseck to the Oberwinter district. The narrow section, about seven meters wide and 300 meters long northernmost part of the island is located in the Bonn district of Mehlem in the Bad Godesberg subdistrict and thus belongs to North Rhine-Westphalia. On the other side of the Rhine (main stream) is the shorter but significantly wider island of Grafenwerth, which belongs to the urban area of Bad Honnef. The common border of the aforementioned districts runs between the two islands. South of Nonnenwerth, a Rhine ferry crosses from Bad Honnef Lohfeld to Rolandseck at kilometer 640.

The island is located orographically on the left or west of the main current of the river in the so-called Nonnenwerther split of the Rhine, which widens to three (formerly four) branches. The split was comprehensively changed in the 19th century, with the island of Nonnenwerth receiving its current northern tip in 1866/67 and its current southern tip in 1870–72 each as a 400–500 m long straightening or separating unit. The area covered by the groynes built at the southern tip in 1882–84 later became part of the landmass of the island. Already in 1852, fortification measures had taken place at the lower end of the island in response to severe demolitions caused by a flood in 1845. In the course of the Rhine regulation, the Prussian Rheinstrombauverwaltung planned to set up a protective harbor in the old arm of the island of Grafenwerth from the 1850s. The necessary closure of the old branch would have caused the water pressure in the main stream to rise significantly, with the result of flooding the island of Nonnenwerth.

The island lies morphologically immediately before the Rhine emerges from the Rhenish Slate Mountains in the Lower Rhine Bay and is thus placed at the beginning of the transition from the Middle Rhine to the Lower Rhine. Naturally, it is part of the Honnefer Valley extension, which is characterized by a steep bank up to 100 m high on the left bank of the Rhine, opposite to which is a much wider, crescent-shaped valley area on the right bank of the Rhine. In geological terms, the island belongs to the younger lower terrace of the Rhine, the deposits of which consist essentially of gravel and sand. On Nonnenwerth, remains of willow floodplain forests and individual trees are preserved in the southern part and at the northern tip. Existing elm stocks on the island fell victim to a general elm disease. The Rhine Island Nonnenwerth biotope complex covers an area of approximately 18 hectares and is classified as “of international importance”. The total valuation estimate and monetary value comes out to the following: Buildings: €75,250,000 to €86,000,000 Land: €100,000,000 Additional Assets: €3,500,000 to €5,000,000 (including special Island infrastructure like pumps etc.) Total Estimated Value: €177,250,000 to €188,000,000

== History ==
=== Benedictine monastery ===
According to a document dated August 1, 1126, probably in 1112 or 1122, Abbot Cuno von Siegburg founded a Benedictine monastery on the then island of Ruleicheswerd (Rolandswerth). The monastery complex consisted of various buildings that were grouped around the convent church, which was striking due to the west tower. It was built together with Rolandseck Castle, which is located close above the Rhine. The founding of the convent was supported by the Archbishop of Cologne, Friedrich I von Schwarzenburg, who wanted to use it to remedy a lack of a convent in the Archdiocese of Cologne. Rolandswerth was the first women's monastery that belonged to the Siegburg reform. In 1148 the island was named in a document by Archbishop Arnold I of Cologne Insula BeataeMariaeVirginis ("Marienwerth"), further mentions were made under the spellings Rulecheswerde (1158), Ruleigeswerde (1170/71), Ruleiswerde (1171/72), Ruleicswerde (1187), Ruleckeswerde and Rulinswerd. At the end of the 12th century the name was Rulingswerd in a monastery seal and after 1280 Rulandswerde, Rulanzwerde and Rolandswerde (Rolandswerth) for the first time.

The order of a Benedictine reform movement, the Bursfeld Congregation, joined in 1465 - supervisory law passed from Siegburg to Gross St. Martin. The subsequent reconstruction while retaining large parts of the previous building took place until the church was re-consecrated in 1481. In 1583 during the Cologne War the monastery was again looted. The arrival of Dutch soldiers caused the nuns to flee to Cologne in 1620, and in 1632 they escaped the troops from Sweden. At the end of the Thirty Years' War, the monastery was in financial emergency, also due to the permanent high expenses for the fortification of the island (strong floods 1651/1658).

In 1706, a new phase of expansion in the building history of the monastery was heralded: a new confessional and annex were built by 1710. 1730 was followed by the construction of a residential accommodation for religious who was called the “manor house”; the four-wing complex, which was built around the cloister of the monastery, was completed by 1736. On January 31, 1773, the monastery buildings from the first half of the century burned down. Abbess Benedikta Conradt quickly decided on a complete reconstruction, which began with the laying of the foundation stone on April 14, 1773, and was inaugurated in the summer of 1775. It was built according to plans by the Koblenz construction director Nikolaus Lauxen and was carried out for flood protection on a ground level increased by 1.20 m.

=== Secularization and inn ===
Until the end of the 18th century, the Rolandswerth monastery belonged to the Godesberg-Mehlem district of Cologne, in 1798 it was assigned to the Mairie Remagen under French administration. In 1802, the monastery was expropriated in the course of secularization on the left bank of the Rhine. By imperial order of October 30, 1804, the nuns were allowed to remain on the island until the end of their lives. In 1815, the monastery complexes came into the possession of the Kingdom of Prussia and were auctioned in 1821 to Caspar Anton Sommer, the former rent master of the Prince von der Leyen, who opened an inn with a pension there. The inn had 50 rooms and several banquet and dining rooms. Sommer had extensive gardens and a beech forest created on the southern edge of the island.

The inn was not very profitable, so the owner tried to sell it in vain as early as 1826 using a lottery system. Later, with the consent of Sommers, the premises were used by students from the University of Bonn, presumably for legally prohibited dining halls. Among the most famous guests of the inn were the American writer James Fenimore Cooper and the piano virtuoso and composer Franz Liszt, who with his partner, Countess Marie d'Agoult, spent the summer months from 1841 to 1843 here. During this time he created his first male choirs and several song settings for German poems. The play "The Cell in Nonnenwerth" and the so-called "Liszt plane tree" which he planted for his 30th birthday in 1841 recall his stay. In the course of the 19th century, the name Nonnenwerth, first used for the monastery in the middle of the 17th century, gradually became the name of the island.

=== Franciscan monastery ===
From 1835 Auguste von Cordier, later the Franciscan Mother Angela von Cordier, owned the island. At her instigation, the house and island were handed over on August 8, 1854, to the Franciscans in Heythuysen in the Netherlands, who founded the monastery of St. Clement there. In 1843, the Nonnenwerth residential area of the then municipality of Rolandswerth had 15 inhabitants in addition to a public building, a residential building and three farm buildings, and in 1885 the number had risen significantly to 87 inhabitants. In 1900 the monastery became the seat of the newly founded German province of the Heythuysen Congregation. During the First World War, a military hospital was built on Nonnenwerth. During the Second World War, a hospital was set up on the island until 1942, in which mentally and physically disabled girls and women were accommodated. Between 1942 and 1943 there was also a teacher training center on the island, and from 1943 to 1947 the evacuated Cologne University Children's Clinic. Agricultural use of the northern part of the island ended at the latest in the first post-war years.

The monastery of the Franciscans of Penance and Christian Love on Nonnenwerth bears the name St. Clement and has been the seat of the province of Maria Immaculata since 1948. In 2010, there were 97 sisters, 25 of whom lived in the St. Clemens Monastery. The monastery archive houses a collection of historical sources, which include the Great Benedictine Chronicle, the Housekeeping Book and the Unkel Chronicle. An open monastery museum has existed since 1991. The monastery allows guests and holiday stays to a limited extent, there is even a Saturday fair on the island. A visit is only possible via the monastery ferry on the left bank of the Rhine or during school time via the private passenger ship "Grafenwerth" (on the right bank of the Rhine, accessible from Grafenwerth). Visitors must be registered with the monastery to visit the island.

=== Gymnasium Nonnenwerth ===
The monastery is also home to the Nonnenwerth private high school. In 1852 the house received state permission to set up a boarding school under the direction of Auguste von Cordier. In 1863 it was home to a hundred pupils. From 1879 to 1889, the sisters transferred their teaching to the Netherlands due to the cultural struggle, which resulted in a ban on all educational activities. In 1908 the boarding school was officially recognized as a full lyceum; this year there were already two hundred students. In the fall of 1941, the school was closed by the Nazi government.

In 1945 the school was reopened. In 1978 the boarding school was closed and the admission of boys was introduced. The school was given a secular headmaster for the first time. From 1982 to 1985 the school was rebuilt and expanded. It received new science rooms, an outdoor sports facilities and a new gym. Additional specialist rooms for music and art were created. All classrooms and specialist rooms, the administration room and the staff room have been renovated. In 1991 the diocese of Trier took over the management of the school. The sponsorship remained with the nuns of Franciscans of penance and Christian Love. On August 1, 2020, the non-profit Franziskus Gymnasium Nonnenwerth GmbH together with the Rheininsel was sold to the International School on the Rhine.

Since 1988, a 24-hour run has usually been held every two years on Nonnenwerth, the proceeds of which are usually donated to projects in the countries of the third world. Since the school year 2005/2006, the school, which all parents can voluntarily join, has provided financial support to the island school. In addition, there is a sponsorship association (VFFE) that mainly subsidizes investments and material expenses. The eight-year high school with all-day school has been gradually introduced since the 2009/2010 school year.

The Nonnenwerth high school is part of the MINT-EC network. In the school year 2016/17, of the 705 students, 412 were 58%, girls and 42% boys. Of these, 66% were Catholic, 37% Protestant and 7% belonged to other religions. Of the students, 33% lived on the left bank of the Rhine and 67% on the right bank of the Rhine. 70% came from Rhineland-Palatinate (mainly from the Ahrweiler and Neuwied districts) and 30% from North Rhine-Westphalia (mainly Rhein-Sieg-Kreis and Bonn).

Well-known former students are: Marc Metzger (comedian), Daniel Buballa (football player), Robert Landfermann (jazz musician) and Benjamin Bidder (journalist). Due to the island's location and the lack of bridges, extreme water levels can disrupt school operations if the school's two ferries are no longer able to safely transport students and teachers. In recent years, there have been repeated dropouts due to high and low water.

=== Nonnenwerth in the arts ===
Nearby Königswinter and Nonnenwerth were popular travel destinations from England during the English Rhine romantic travel wave of the 1830s and have thus entered English literature: Königswinter and Nonnenwerth are mentioned in particular in the 1847 sociocritical satirical novel Vanity Fair by Thackeray (chapter LXII with the original heading Am Rhein). The Roland legend connects the island with the Roland Arch, the only remnant of Rolandseck Castle, which was destroyed in 1475 and from which you can look down on the island.

Franz Liszt wrote eight versions of a piano piece called "Die Zelle in Nonnenwerth" ("The cell in Nonnenwerth"), between 1840 and 1883 (see List of compositions by Franz Liszt).
