= Theodor Heuss Bridge (Düsseldorf) =

Bridge over the Rhine

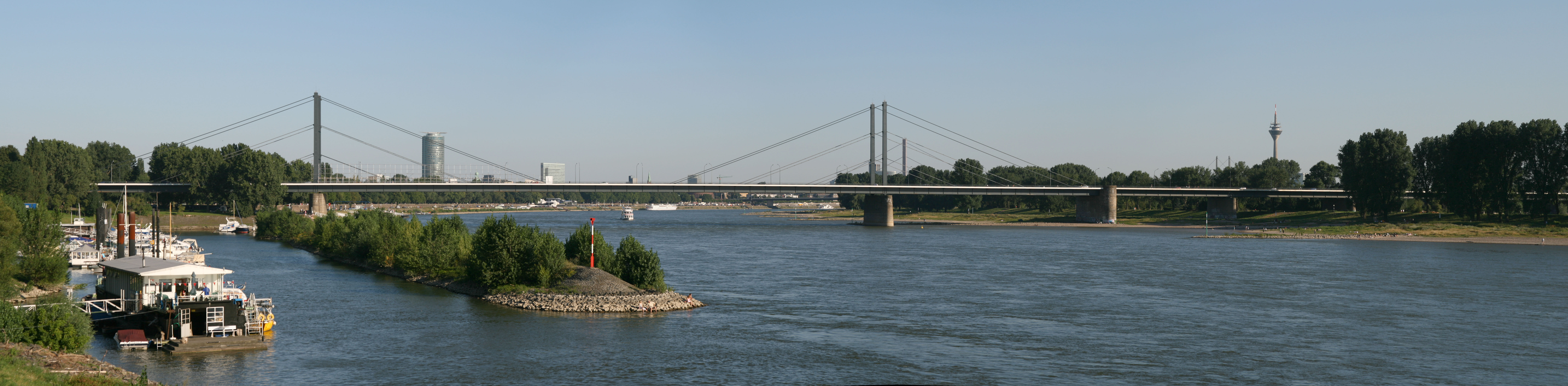
- The Theodor Heuss Bridge in Düsseldorf
- Coordinates: 51°14′49″N 6°45′35″E
- Carries: Bundesstraße 7
- Crosses: Rhine River
- Locale: Düsseldorf-Golzheim and Düsseldorf-Niederkassel, North Rhine-Westphalia, Germany
- Official name: Theodor-Heuss-Brücke

Characteristics
- Material: Prestressed concrete, composite, and steel
- Total length: 1,271 m (4,170 ft)
- Width: 27 m (89 ft)
- Longest span: 260 m (850 ft)
- No. of spans: 6

History
- Construction start: 1953
- Construction end: 1957

Location
- Interactive map of Theodor Heuss Bridge

The Theodor Heuss Bridge also known as the Nordbrücke (North bridge) is a cable-stayed bridge over the Rhine River in Düsseldorf built from 1953 to 1957 with a main span of 260 m (850 ft) flanked on either side by spans of 108 m (354 ft).

It was the first cable-stayed bridge built in Germany. Along with two other cable-stayed bridges to the south, the Oberkassel Bridge and the Knie Bridge, the Theodor Heuss Bridge forms the northern leg of Düsseldorf's family of bridges over the Rhine.

The bridge carries Bundesstraße 7, downtown connector to Autobahn 52. Growing traffic volume in the bridge relaxed in May 2002 due to the opening of the Airport Bridge to the north.

== See also ==
- List of bridges in Germany
