= International School on the Rhine =

International school in the Neuss/Düsseldorf area, Germany

Coordinates: 51.1998°N 6.6628°E

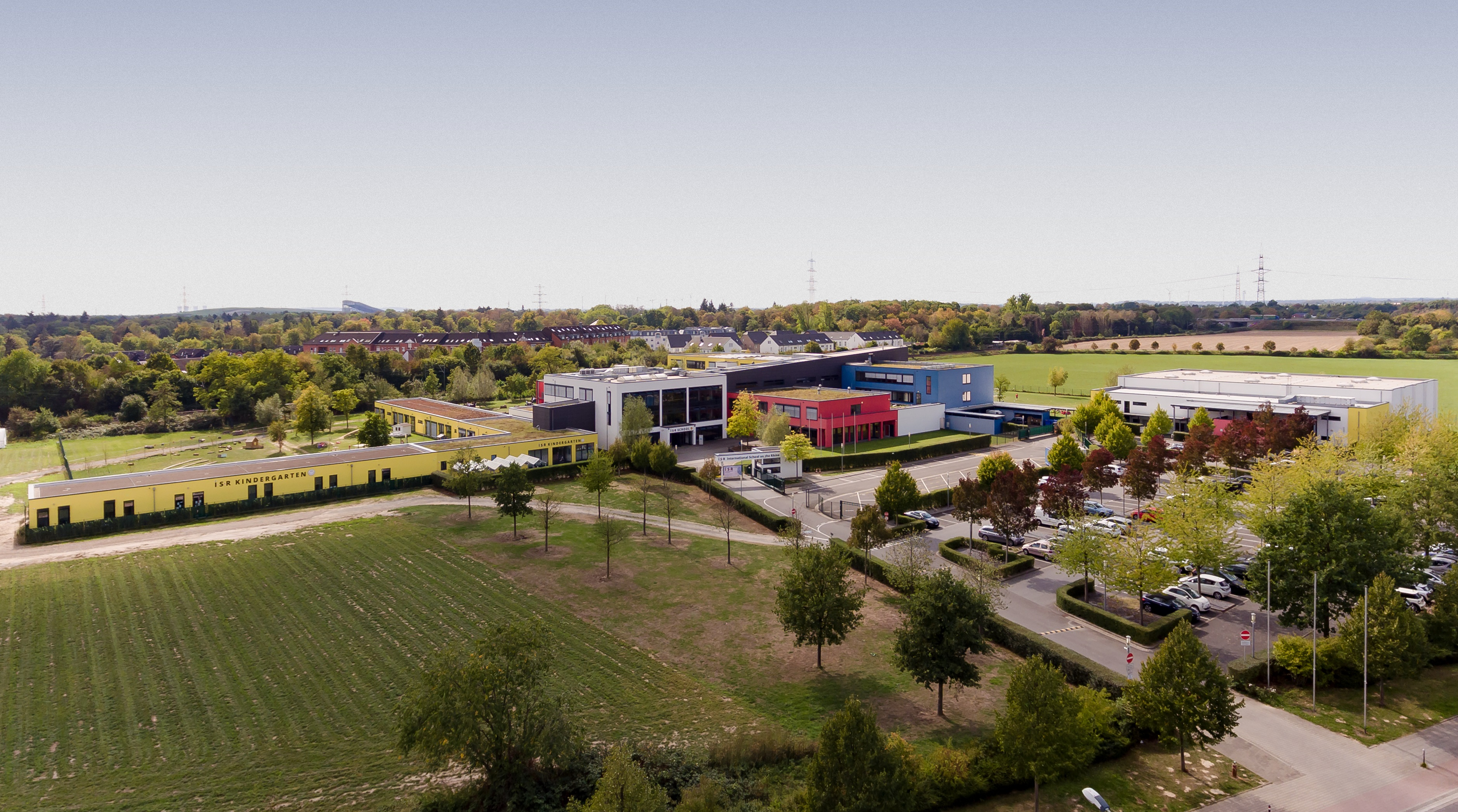
Campus of the International School on the Rhine

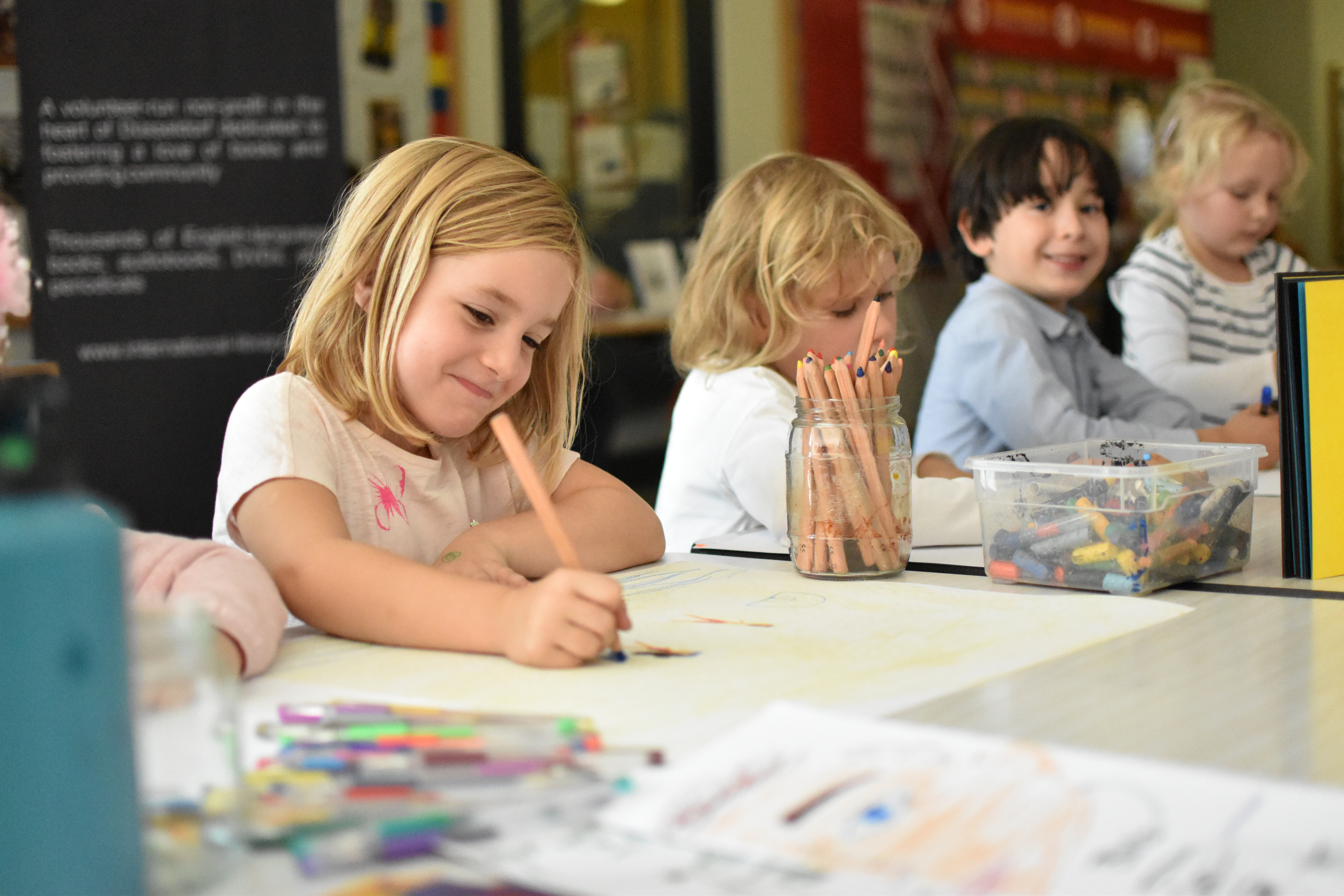
Students at ISR International School on the Rhine

ISR International School on the Rhine is a private school that started operation in 2003 in the Neuss/Düsseldorf area in North Rhine-Westphalia, Germany. The school provides international education from Kindergarten through Grade 12 at locations in Neuss, Düsseldorf and Meerbusch. The county of Neuss, the city of Neuss, the Neuss Chamber of Commerce and local and international companies in the region joined to establish an international college preparatory school.

When it first opened in 2003, the school had 65 students. It has since grown to more than 1,200 students from approximately 60 countries.

The school offers a full-day academic program and is accredited by the state of North Rhine-Westphalia. In 2006, ISR was accredited by Cognia, and in 2008 it became an authorized International Baccalaureate (IB) World School. The following leaving certificates are offered: ISR High School Diploma, IGCSE, Advanced Placement and International Baccalaureate (IB).

== Campus and locations ==
=== Kindergarten and School in Neuss ===
The Neuss campus of ISR International School on the Rhine is located in the Stadtwald district of Neuss, North Rhine-Westphalia, Germany. It offers the complete educational pathway from Kindergarten through Grade 12, comprising the Kindergarten, Elementary School and Secondary School on a single site. In 2018, ISR took over the neighboring district sports facility as leaseholder. In 2025, the school took over the adjoining tennis and archery complex at Stoffelsweg, comprising seven tennis courts and an archery range, bringing the total campus area to 150,000 m².

=== Kindergartens ===
ISR operates three kindergartens. In addition to the kindergarten on the Neuss campus, an English-language ISR kindergarten for children from the age of three opened in Düsseldorf-Niederkassel at the end of 2019; English is taught by native speakers and supplemented by compulsory German lessons. In 2021, a third kindergarten opened in Meerbusch-Büderich, a German-language kindergarten with a bilingual program for children from the age of one.

=== Elementary School in Düsseldorf ===
The ISR Elementary School Düsseldorf will open in August 2027, serving Grades 1 to 6, in Düsseldorf-Oberkassel, following the renovation of the former Comenius-Gymnasium building at Comeniusstraße 1. The building was constructed in 1912 for a school founded in 1908 as a "Higher Boys' School" in the then-independent municipality of Heerdt; the Comenius-Gymnasium relocated to a new building in 1972. The elementary school's curriculum is planned to follow the Cambridge framework, with English as the language of instruction, German as a core subject, and a third language (Spanish, French, Japanese or Mandarin) from Grade 6. Students completing Grade 6 in Düsseldorf continue at the secondary school on the Neuss campus.

In January 2020, it was announced that ISR would take over the Rhine island of Nonnenwerth along with the affiliated high school on August 1, 2020.

== Notable alumni ==
- Liu Yangyang – Taiwanese rapper and singer; member of K-pop boy group NCT and its Chinese sub-unit WayV
