= Düsseldorf-Niederkassel =

- Stadtteil of Düsseldorf
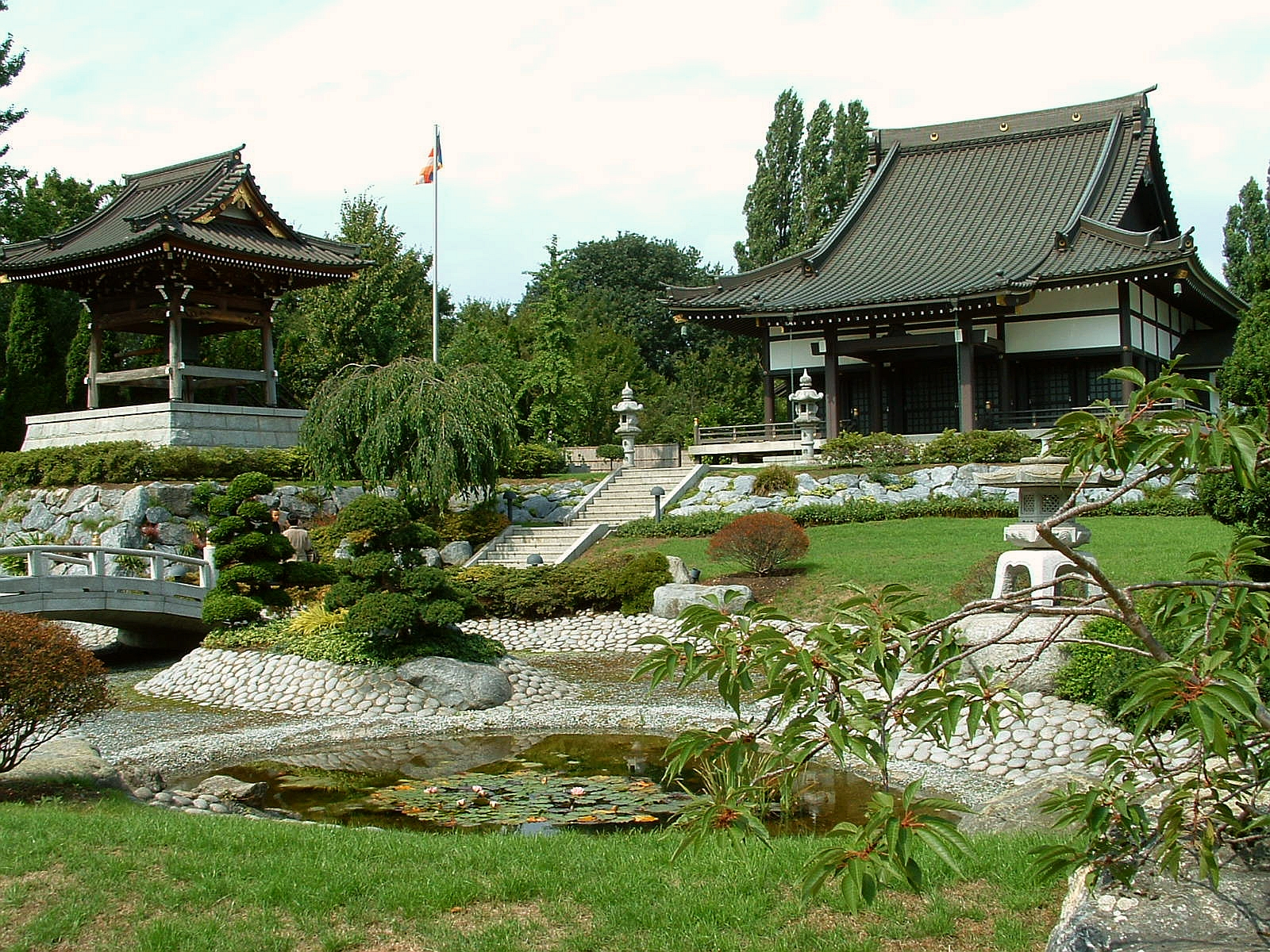
- Ekō House, Japanese Cultural Centre in Niederkassel

- Map of Düsseldorf, showing Niederkassel (in red) within Borough 4 (in pink)
- Interactive map of Düsseldorf-Niederkassel
- Location within Germany Location within North Rhine-Westphalia
- Coordinates: 51°14′24″N 6°45′00″E
- Country: Germany
- State: North Rhine-Westphalia
- District: Urban district
- City: Düsseldorf
- Borough: Borough 4

Area
  - Total: 2.34 km^{2} (0.90 sq mi)

Population (2020-12-31)
  - Total: 6,079
  - Density: 2,600/km^{2} (6,730/sq mi)
- Time zone: UTC+01:00 (CET)
  - Summer (DST): UTC+02:00 (CEST)

Niederkassel (German pronunciation: [ˈniːdɐˌkasl̩], lit. 'Lower Kassel', in contrast to "Upper Kassel") is a quarter of the city of Düsseldorf, part of Borough 4. It is located on the west side of the river Rhine, bordering Oberkassel and Lörick. It has an area of 2.34 km^{2} (0.90 sq mi), and 6,079 inhabitants (2020). It was connected to Düsseldorf when the Oberkassel Bridge was opened in 1898.

It was originally part of the district of Heerdt, until Heerdt became a part of Düsseldorf in 1909.

At the start of the 20th century, Oberkassel and Niederkassel were popular places for artist's residences., prompted by the national arts exhibition in Düsseldorf in 1902.

In the 1970s, Oberkassel and Niederkassel become a popular place for the Japanese community in Germany to live. In 1973 the permanent facility of Japanese School of Düsseldorf opened in Niederkassel. In 1993 the Ekō House, a center for Japanese culture with a traditional Japanese tea house and a Buddhist temple, was opened there. Niederkassel sometimes is called "Klein-Tokio" ("Little Tokyo") by locals.

Since 1887, a fete with an annual barrel race has been held in Niederkassel. The barrels are carried in special handcarts called "Schörskar".
