= Japanische Internationale Schule in Düsseldorf =

- デュッセルドルフ日本人学校

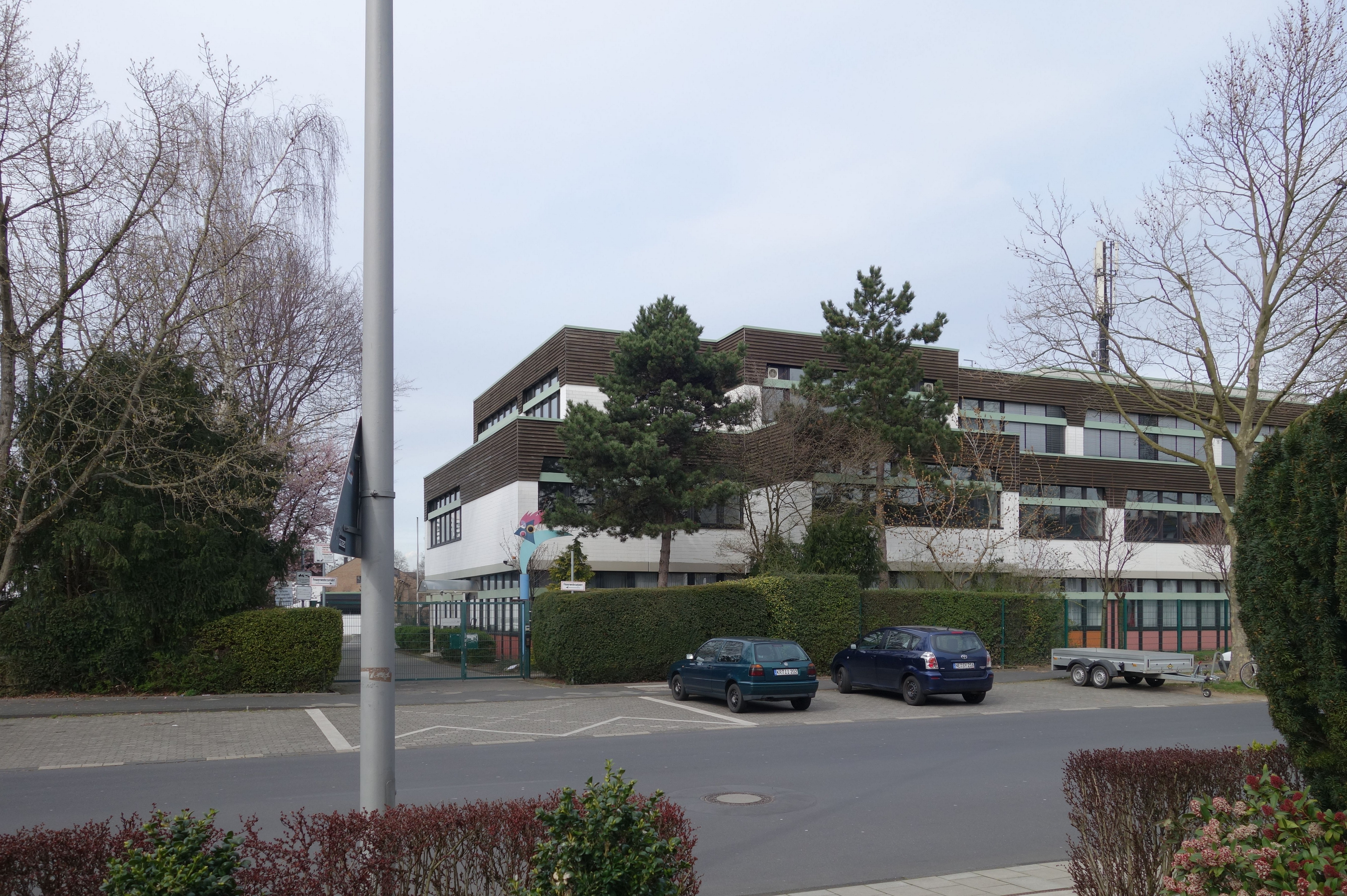

Location
- Niederkasseler Kirchweg 38, 40547 Düsseldorf; Düsseldorf; Germany; 51.23665°N 6.74017°E

Information
- Type: Primary & middle school
- Established: 1971; 55 years ago
- Grades: 1-9
- Website: jisd.de

Japanische Internationale Schule e.V. in Düsseldorf (デュッセルドルフ日本人学校, Dyusserudorufu Nihonjin Gakkō; JISD, German: "Japanese International School in Düsseldorf") is a Japanese international school in Oberkassel, Düsseldorf, Germany.

Japanische Ergänzungsschule in Düsseldorf (デュッセルドルフ日本語補習校 Dyusserudorufu Nihongo Hoshūkō), a Japanese weekend school, is a part of the institution.

== History ==
It first opened on April 21, 1971 in the Canisiushaus building of the St. Antonius Church in Oberkassel. It served 43 students in grades 5 through 9. In 1972 classes for grades 1-4 opened at the Don Bosco School in Oberkassel, with 90 students. That year, the Japanese Ministry of Education recognized the school as an international school.

In 1973 a dedicated school building, located in Oberkassel, opened. The growth of Japan's economy resulted in an expansion in the student body. Due to overcrowding, the junior high school moved to a satellite building in 1983. The Lanker School, a former public school building in Oberkassel, began serving the junior high students. In 1985 the school had 880 students ages 6 through 15.

As of 1985, as there were not yet any Japanese curriculum high schools in Europe, graduates typically went back to Japan to attend high school as they were not equipped enough in German to enter German upper secondary education systems. At that time the enrollment was 900.

The student population peaked in 1992. In 2001 the junior high school moved back to the main building.

Since the early 1980s and as of 2003 the school's secondary division has consistently had over 500 students.

As of 2016 the school had 356 students in elementary school, grades 1-6, and 108 students in junior high school, grades 7-9.

== Curriculum ==
Because Japanese parents want their students to be prepared for higher education in Japan, most courses were taught in Japanese. As of 1985 students take German language lessons for two hours per week. Fukushima, an official of the school quoted in an Associated Press article, stated in 1985 that he wanted to organize inter-cultural activities such as stage plays and picnics and to increase instruction time of German classes to increase interaction between Japanese and Germans in the area.

== Teachers ==
Each teacher comes from Japan to the school and teaches on a three year shift. As of 1985 the school had 30 teachers.

== See also ==
- Japanese community of Düsseldorf
- Japan Day in Düsseldorf
- German international schools in Japan:
  - German School Tokyo Yokohama - in Yokohama, Japan
  - Deutsche Schule Kobe/European School
