= Düsseldorf-Oberkassel =

City district of Düsseldorf, Germany

Coordinates: 51°13′49″N 6°45′18″E

Oberkassel (German pronunciation: [ˈoːbɐˌkasl̩], lit. 'Upper Kassel', in contrast to "Lower Kassel"; Limburgish: Ueverkassel) is a part of Düsseldorf's Borough 4. Oberkassel lies on the west side of the river Rhine, the opposite side of the central district of Düsseldorf. It has an area of 3.68 km^{2} (1.42 sq mi), and 19,052 inhabitants (2020).

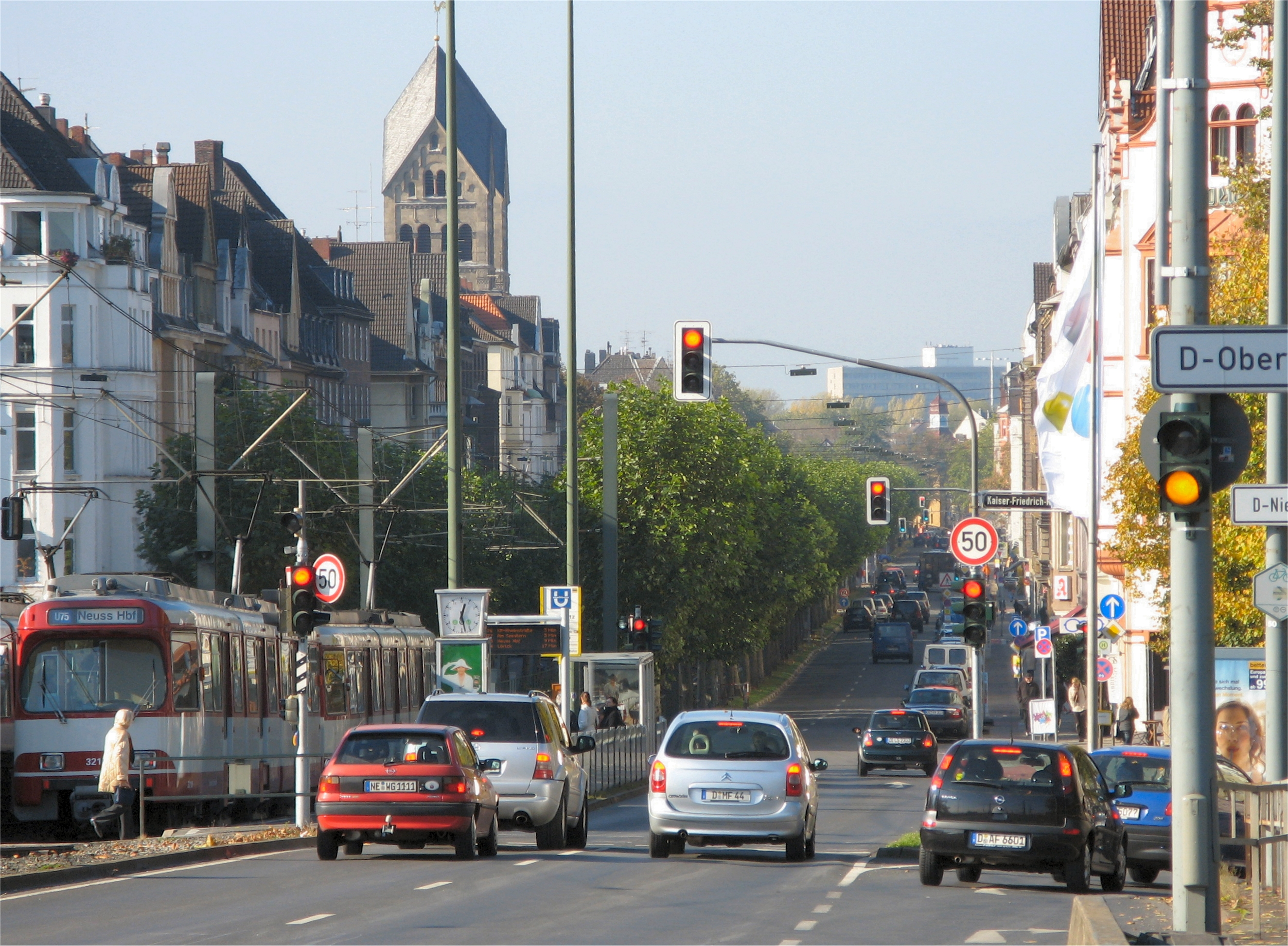
Luegallee

Map of Düsseldorf, showing Oberkassel (in red) within Borough 4 (in pink)

Oberkassel is an economically well-situated borough with an average income of 61.465 Euro and an unemployment rate below 5%. Nearly half of the households in Oberkassel are single households. The average age is about 45 years.

== History ==
The settlement Heerdt was first mentioned was in the 9th century CE.

- 1898: The Oberkassel Bridge between Düsseldorf-Heerdt and Düsseldorf was opened.
- 1909: Heerdt, and with Heerdt Oberkassel, became a part of Düsseldorf.
- 1920: Following the use of the Freikorps by the German Social Democratic Government, Oberkassel was occupied by Belgian troops.
- 1945: The bridge was nearly captured by American troops disguised as Germans. It was then dynamited by the retreating Wehrmacht.

In the 20th century, Oberkassel became a quarter of Düsseldorf.

== Modern Oberkassel ==
Oberkassel is a socially well-to-do part of Düsseldorf. The average age of Oberkassel's residents is 44.

A large part of Düsseldorf's Japanese population lives in Oberkassel. There is a Japanese kindergarten and a Japanese school in Düsseldorf-Niederkassel, a neighboring district, as well as a Japanese cultural centre, the Eko-House, and a Buddhist temple.

== Education ==
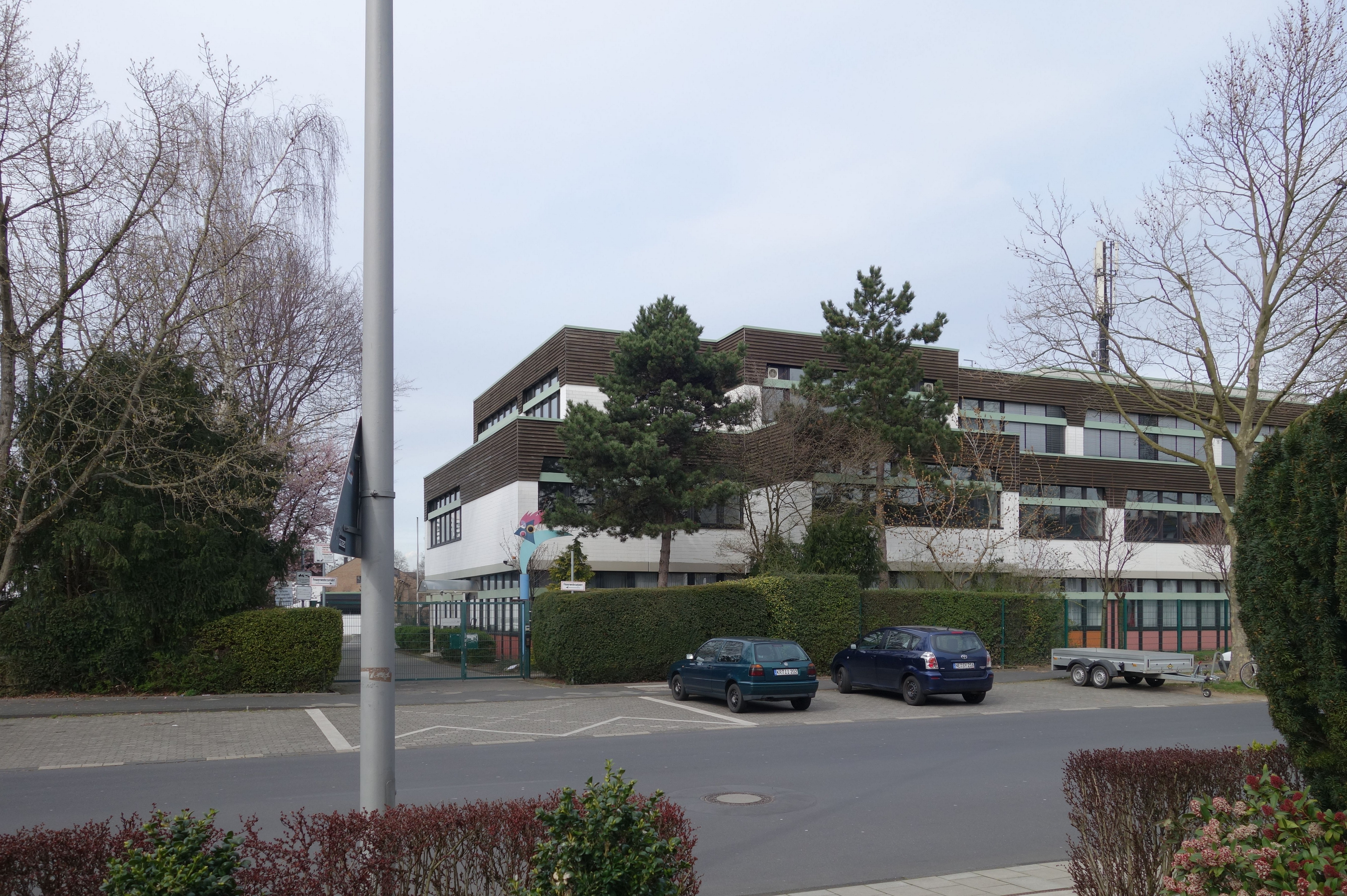
Japanische Internationale Schule in Düsseldorf

There are two primary schools in Oberkassel, the Comenius-Gymnasium on Hansaallee and the private Japanese International School near the neighboring district of Niederkassel. In Niederkassel there is another high school, a secondary school and a Catholic primary school. The secondary school, the Maximilian-Kolbe-Schule in the old Comenius-Gymnasium building, located on the district border with Niederkassel, was closed at the end of the 1990s. The building is now home to the branch on the left bank of the Rhine of the city's Clara Schumann Music School.

== Interesting buildings ==
- Rom.-Catholic St. Antonius Church, constructed between 1909 and 1910 by Josef Kleesattel in the Neo-romantic style
- Evangelical Resurrection Church (Auferstehungskirche), built between 1913 and 1914 by Julius Stobbe and Wilhelm Verheyen.
- The Julia Stoschek Collection in Düsseldorf-Oberkassel opened in 2007, and has two floors of exhibition space, over 2,500 square metres (27,000 sq ft).
