= Lohausen =

City district of Düsseldorf, Germany

Coordinates: 51°16′51″N 6°44′12″E

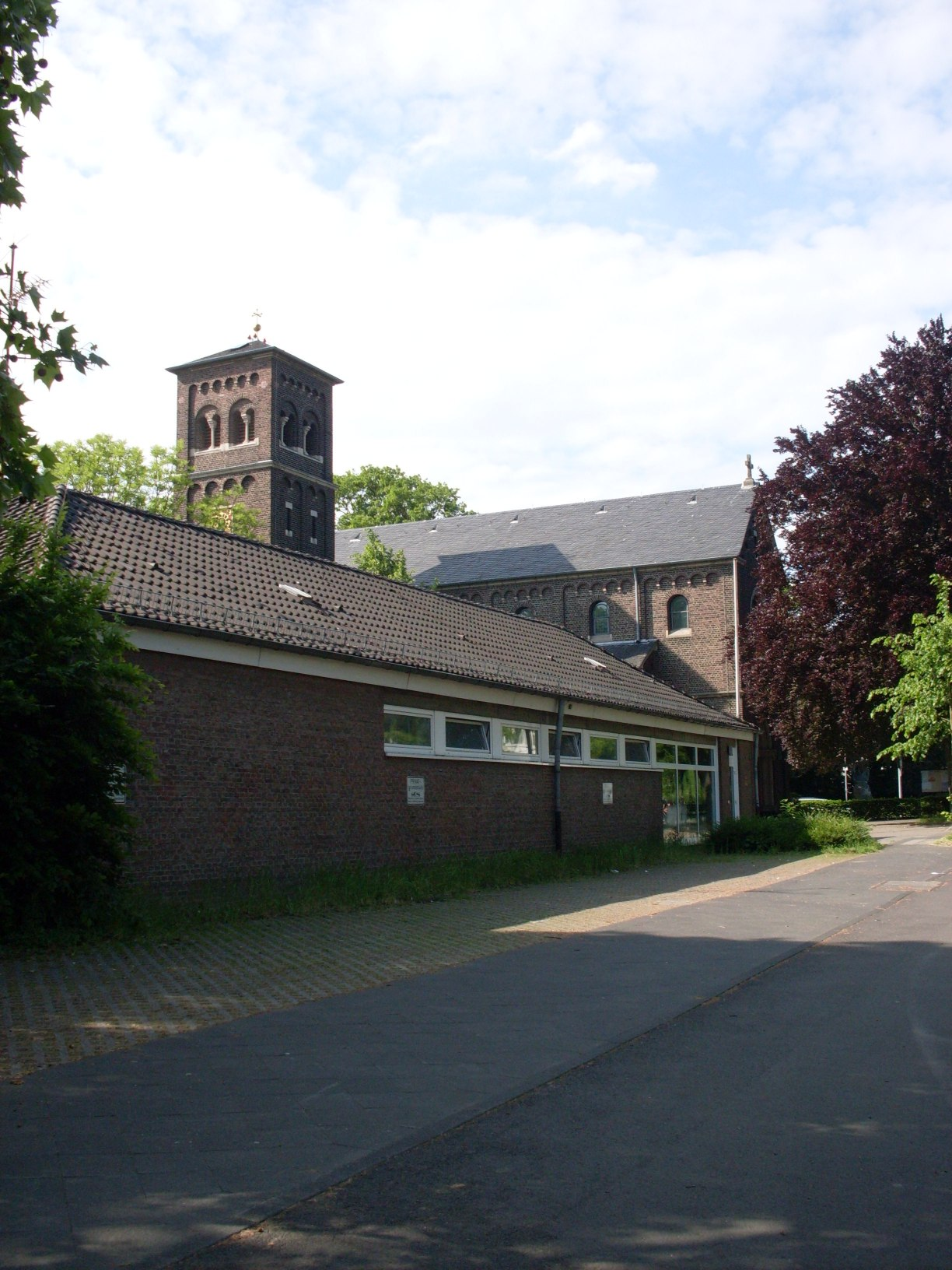
Church of Lohausen

map of Düsseldorf, showing Lohausen (in red) within District 5 (in pink)

Lohausen (German pronunciation: [loˈhaʊzn̩]) is an urban quarter in the north of Düsseldorf, bordering on Stockum, Kaiserswerth, Unterrath, Wittlaer, the river Rhine and Ratingen. It is part of Borough 5. The airport of Düsseldorf is in Lohausen.

Lohausen was written mentioned first time in 1147. It was one of the seats of the Knights of Kalcheim (today: Kalkum). Lohausen was a farming settlement for a long while. In the 19th century an industrialist bought the Castle of the Knights of Kalcheim and created a park. After that, more rich people went to Lohausen and it became an exclusive place of living. In 1929 Lohausen became a part of Düsseldorf. The airport opened in 1927.

Lohausen has an area of 12.42 km^{2} (4.80 sq mi), but only 4,170 inhabitants, which means the population density is about 350 inhabitants per km^{2}.
