= Wittlaer =

City district of Düsseldorf, Germany

Coordinates: 51°18′54″N 6°45′02″E

Wittlaer (German pronunciation: [ˈvɪtlaːɐ̯]) is an urban quarter of Düsseldorf, part of Borough 5. It borders Stockum, Kalkum, Angermund, and the city of Duisburg. It is close to Düsseldorf Airport. Wittlaer has the lowest point in Düsseldorf, where the Schwarzbach flows into the river Rhine. It is 28 m above sea level. It has an area of 6.89 km^{2} (2.66 sq mi), and 8,117 inhabitants (2020).

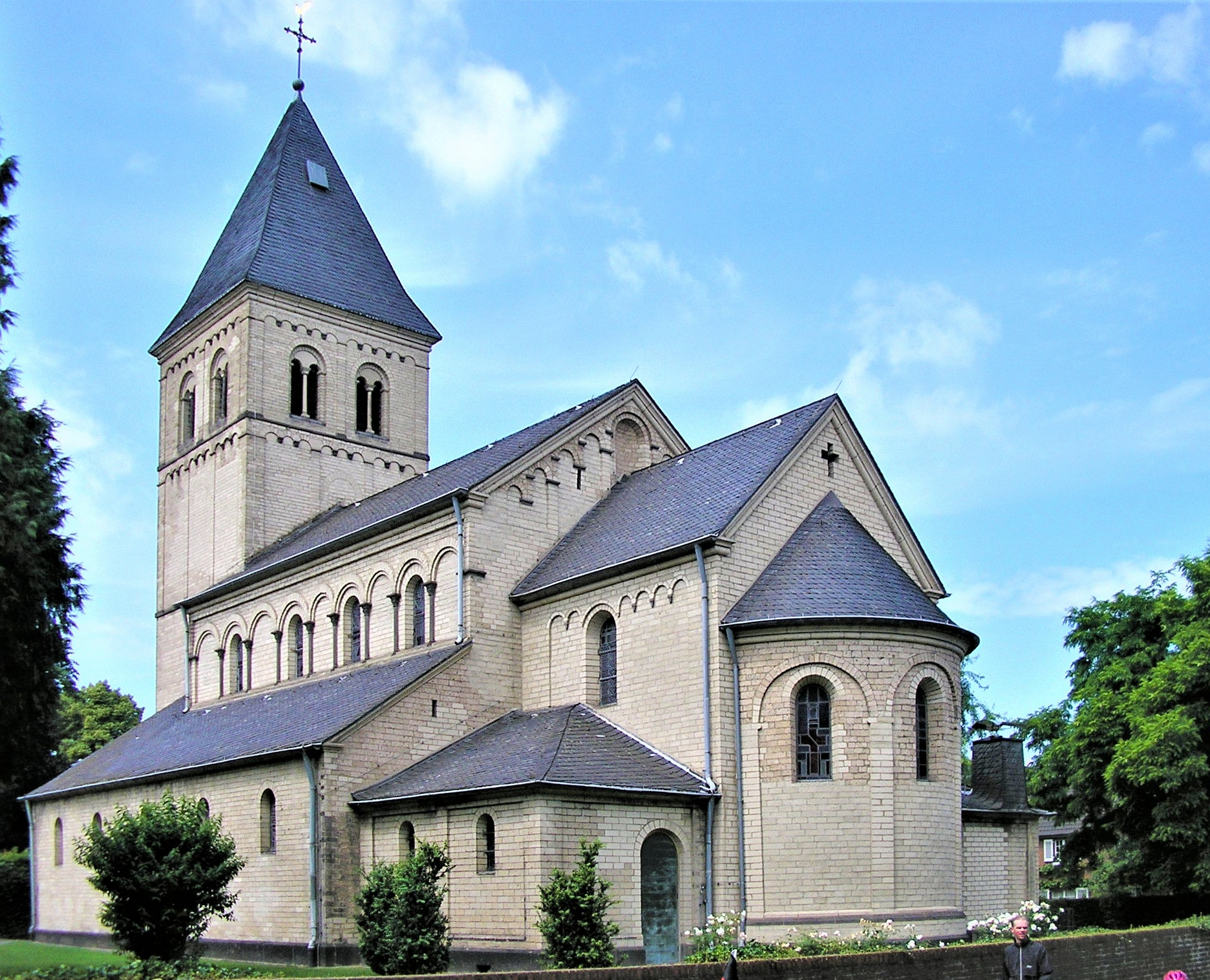
St Remigius in Wittlaer

Map of Düsseldorf, showing Wittlaer (in red) within Borough 5 (in pink)

The history of Wittlaer started at latest in the 12th century. For a long time it was an agricultural settlement. After World War II, Wittlaer grew as a suburb of Düsseldorf and Duisburg. In 1975, Wittlaer became a part of Düsseldorf.

The most prominent sight of Wittlaer is the Catholic Church St. Remigius, dating from the 13th century.

Wittlaer is connected to the airport by road and bus links, the federal road B 8 goes across Wittlaer. Wittlaer has an underground line station.

Wittlaer has two newer settlements, which are separated from the nucleus of Wittlaer:

- Froschenteich
- Einbrungen
