= Steinhauser Bach =

Steinhauser Bach may refer to:

- Steinhauser Bach, a small river of North Rhine-Westphalia, Germany, tributary of the Wupper
- Steinhauser Bach (Schwarzbach), a river at Mettmann, North Rhine-Westphalia, Germany, tributary of the Schwarzbach (Bergisches Land)
