= Stockum =

City district of Düsseldorf, Germany

Coordinates: 51°15′36″N 6°45′12″E

Map of Düsseldorf, showing Stockum (in red) within Borough 5 (in pink)

Stockum (German pronunciation: [ˈʃtɔkʊm]) is an urban quarter of Düsseldorf, part of Borough 5. It is located north of Unterrath and Golzheim, east of Kaiserswerth, west of Lohausen and the Düsseldorf Airport, south of Kalkum.

Stockum has an area of 5.74 km^{2} (2.22 sq mi), and 5,596 inhabitants (2020). Stockum became a part of Düsseldorf in 1909.

In 1971 the Düsseldorf Exhibition Center went to Stockum. It has 18 halls and an exhibition area of about 200,000 m². There is a huge park (Nordpark) in Stockum, too. In that park there is an aqua zoo and a Japanese garden. North of the exhibition center there is the new multifunctional sports arena of Düsseldorf, the Esprit Arena.

Stockum belongs to the richest districts Düsseldorfs. The yearly average income lies at 60.697 Euro (as of 31 December 2007).

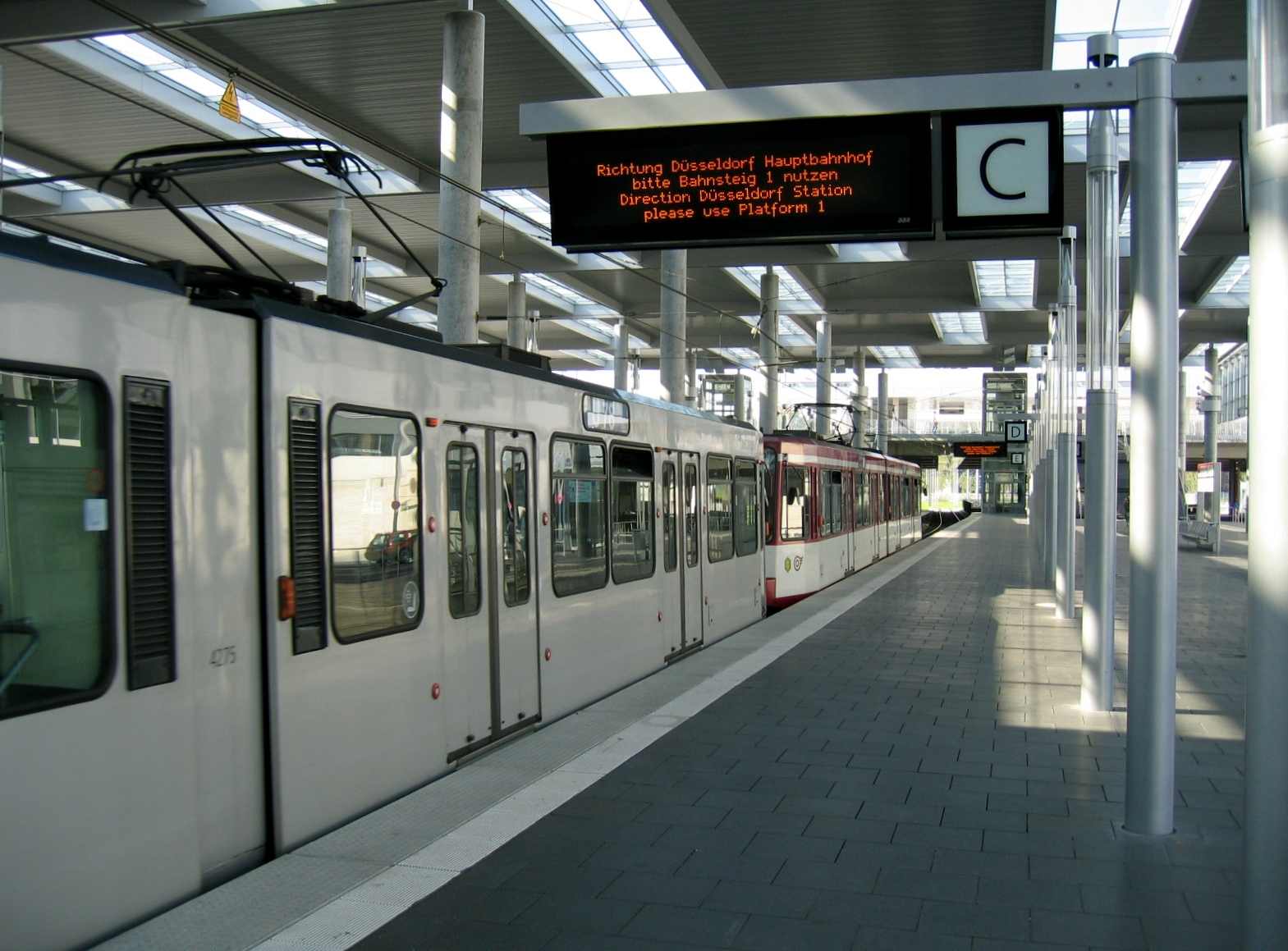
Metro Station Exhibition Centre Northern Entrance

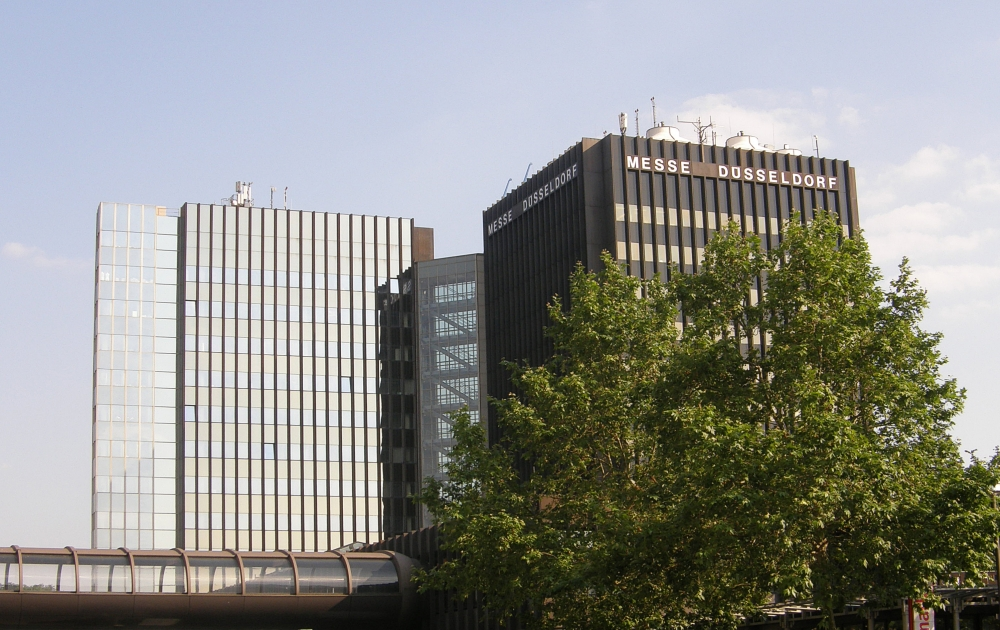
Office of Düsseldorf Exhibition Centre

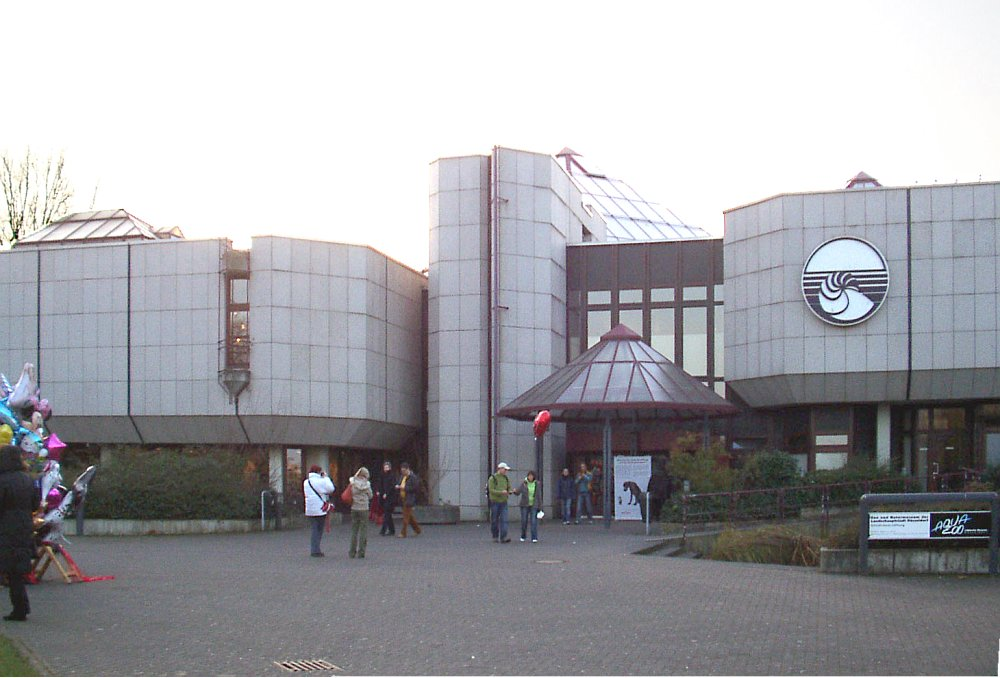
Aquazoo

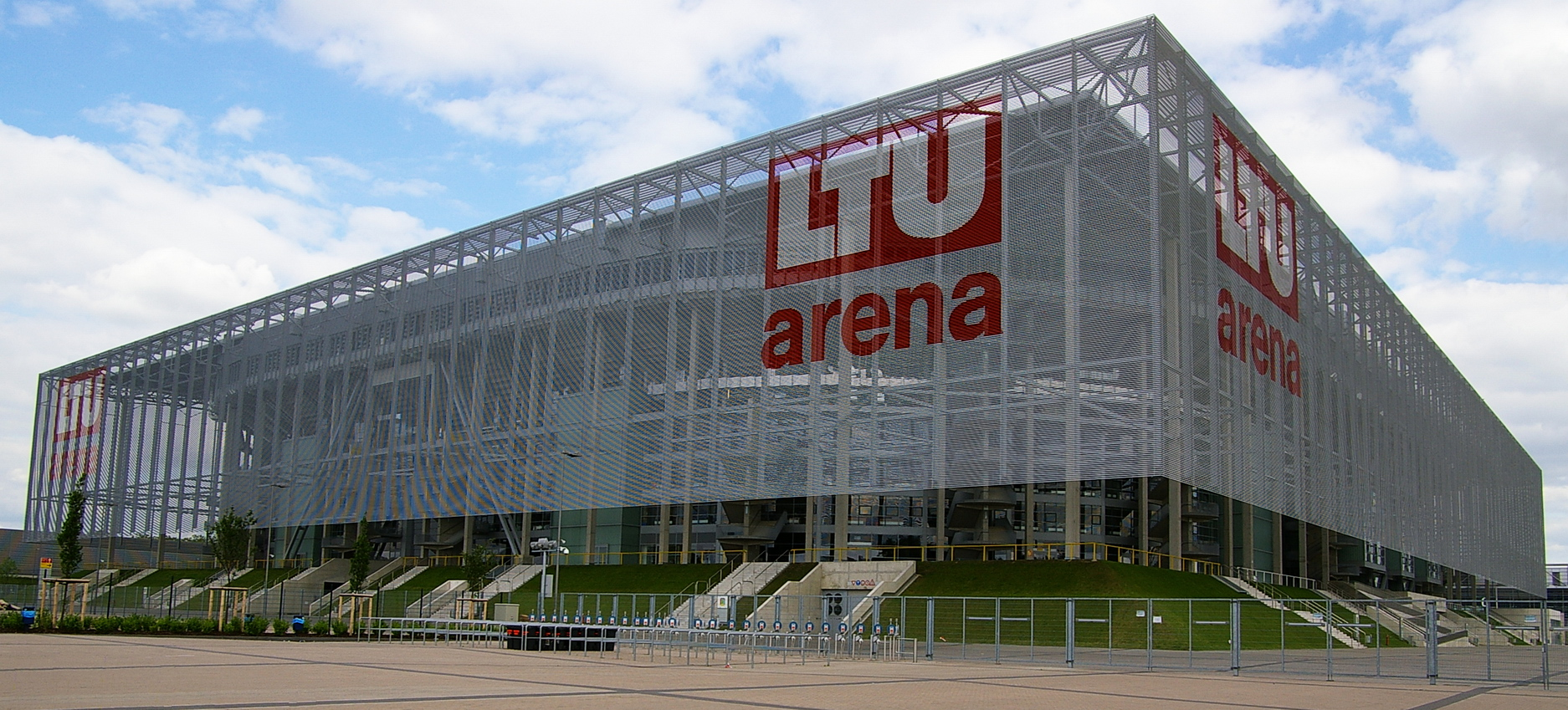
Football Stadion
