= E. O. Köpke =

German artist (1914 - 2009)

Ernst Otto Köpke, also EO Köpke (November 19, 1914 in Diez - August 16, 2009 in Hamburg] was a German painter and graphic artist. His oeuvre, spanning a creative period of 70 years from 1934 to 2004, is very diverse. In addition to its main focus on stained glass, paintings and print graphics it also includes numerous works of commercial art, art in architecture, mosaics, book illustration as well as sketches (designs) for liturgical paraphernalia, for jewellery and for ceramic sculptures.

The given name Ernst Otto were never used by the artist himself, but were always combined into E.O. or EO. This applied both to the verbal form of address and to his signature. He would sign his works with EOK or, more rarely, EOKöpke.

== Life ==
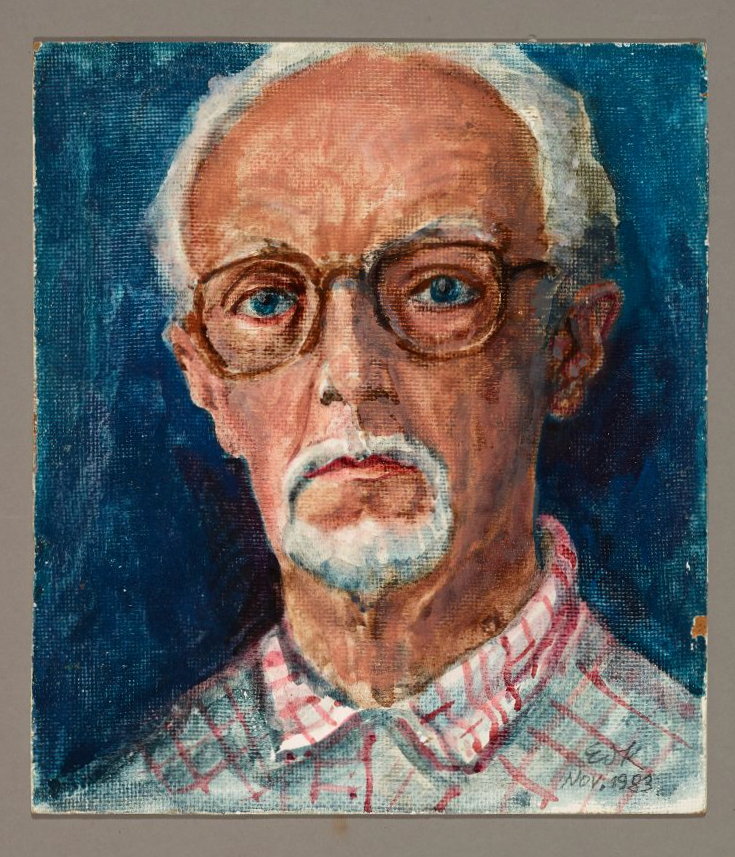
EO Köpke Selbstportrait 1983

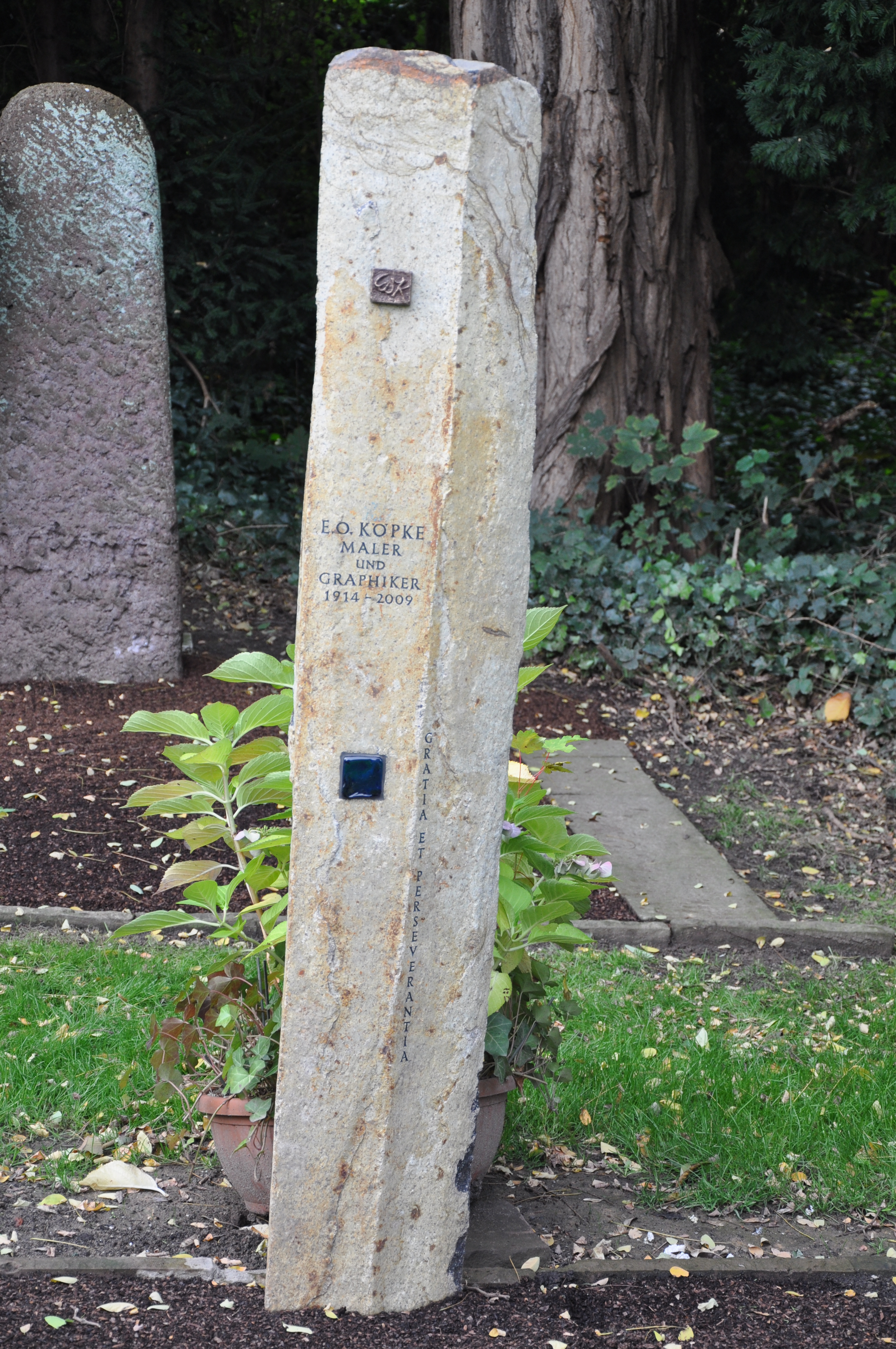
EO Köpke: The artist's Tombstone

Ernst Otto Köpke was a son of Dr. Ernst Köpke and his wife Elisabeth, née Schmidt. The given names "Ernst Otto" were never used by the artist himself, but were always combined into E.O. or EO. He lived in Düsseldorf from 1921 and studied at the well known private art school Kunstschule Carp from 1933 to 1936 and at the Kunstakademie Düsseldorf from 1936 to 1940 under Werner Heuser and Erhardt Klonk. His special interest was always stained glass and already in his second semester his choir- window designs for the Romanesque church of St. Lambertus in Kalkum near Düsseldorf were executed. Other areas of interest were mosaics, painting - especially watercolours - and printmaking.

At the outbreak of the World War II, Köpke was able to complete his studies in a regular manner in 1940 as he was declared to be of 'limited suitability' for military service. He was then drafted into the National Labour Service and later into an Air Force construction company. On December 4, 1944, he became an American prisoner of war during the Battle of the Bulge, from which he was released in February 1946. "During my war service and American captivity, I continued my artistic activity with portrait drawings, book illustrations and murals in various military quarters. Through my friendship with the Franciscan priest Stefan Krupp, I experienced a significant widening of my field of vision and gained insights for working with art in church interiors. The furnishings of the camp church, designs for church objects of the most diverse kinds, and even paramentics document this development." Many drawings, paintings and photographs from this period have survived. The picture book on Noah's Ark, opulently designed in captivity for his first-born son, was shown in a separate exhibition at the Stadtmuseum in Düsseldorf in 1984.

From two divorced marriages, E.O. Köpke had three children. Even into old age, he followed his ideal of the "artist", to be inspired by a muse - changing, but always female - whom he sometimes sketched or even portrayed. However, he would always put his devotion to art first and therefore preferred to live alone in the long run. This did not prevent him from intensively cultivating numerous friendships throughout Germany and the USA over many decades, including with the American director of his prisoner-of-war camp. This is evidenced by countless long letters he wrote and received. He maintained a special relationship with the art sociologist Konrad Pfaff, who accompanied Köpke's artistic work over several decades. In a series of sensitively written academic papers, he paid special attention to the paintings that Köpke created between the end of the 1960s and the beginning of the 1990s, the highly geometrical "Signalbilder" (Signal Paintings) and paintings of the series "Mit heller Mitte" (With a bright Centre), which were created from the end of the 1960s to the beginning of the 1990s.

E.O. Köpke also distinguished himself as a highly gifted teacher in his private "Malschule" (school of painting) from 1979 to 2004. One of his former students is the well-known designer Janina Lamberty.

Due to severe illness, he moved to Hamburg in 2006, where he died in 2009. He is buried in his home town of Düsseldorf.

== Oeuvre ==
E.O. Köpke's work is best known for his stained glass works in many churches and public buildings throughout the Rhineland, but also beyond, e.g. in Erlangen (Bavaria) and in Berlin. These stained glass works have a "natural value for the general public as they are not perceived (merely) as museum-like pieces of art but as an element of the furnishings of usually religious, but also public or sometimes even private buildings („selbstverständlichen Öffentlichkeitswert, werden sie doch nicht als museale Kunstwerke rezipiert, vielmehr als Ausstattungselemente in der Regel sakraler (aber auch öffentlicher und gelegentlich auch privater) Gebäude". In comparison, Köpke's work in painting is less well known, although selected works have been shown in a number of important exhibitions.

E.O. Köpke possessed a strong creative urge. He ceaselessly drew, sketched or painted with a wide variety of materials. He had a profound knowledge of painting and artistic printing techniques. He was also familiar with basic artistic and craft techniques, such as making his own paints or making a leaded glass window, and not only in theory. His craftsmanship was evident, among other things, in the models he built himself for his exhibitions or for designs for art in buildings. He designed the frames and especially the passe-partouts for his paintings with the greatest care, and he also made most of them himself. Hence his paintings, passepartouts and frames form usually an exceptional synthesis of the arts that arouses attention.

E.O. Köpke's painting style changed several times during the 70 years of his artistic career. He set himself new artistic challenges again and again. In the art scene of the painting metropolis Düsseldorf he was very well connected and known. While he was always informed about worldwide trends in the international art scene, he predominantly followed his own path in his painting. It is only in the 1950s that influences from Jackson Pollock's painting style become discernible.

In terms of style, Köpke's stained glass works, though always of outstanding quality, are considerably more contemporary than his paintings. However, here too he developed a uniquely distinctive artistic style from as early as the 1960s.

=== Paintings, Printed Graphics and Commercial Art ===
"It is well known that painters are reluctant to let go of their paintings, although most would eagerly sell their work. A painting is like a part of oneself, and almost all painters find it difficult to part with their creation. Indeed some do not sell at all if they can afford not to (do so). The Düsseldorf painter E.O. Köpke makes stained glass windows and mosaics for the public, but he does not relinquish his paintings. He cannot part with his 'children', even if it makes his studio cramped."

The paintings by E.O. Köpke, "which are directly linked to his stained glass works in their aesthetic formulation, complement each other in many respects and repeatedly adopt colour and compositional elements from each other, form an important part of his oeuvre." Since he was also quite successful commercially with his works (stained glass, art on buildings and mosaics), he could afford not to sell his paintings. Only in exceptional cases did he allow himself to be persuaded by people who were particularly close to his heart to sell them a painting or at least to lend it to them. The only exceptions are some early watercolours he painted in the Düsseldorf area between 1946 and 1950, which were acquired by the Stadtmuseum Düsseldorf in 1985.

Köpke's paintings prior to 1950 are mainly portraits, images of saints and landscapes. He also created numerous graphic prints employing various techniques such as linocut and woodcut.

In July 1957, Köpke noted on the back of an 18.3 x 6.7 cm painting: "My first completely abstract painting, i.e. designed without a given theme or object." From then on he began to paint large-scale abstract pictures. In the 1960s he created so-called "Signalbilder" and paintings "Mit heller Mitte". For the "Signalbilder", distinguished by a strong use of colour, the following applies: "Without image and fable, spatial structure is transformed into colour mesh ... Signs are left devoid of their character as signs. They are merely the physical presence of spatial sections and colour fields. Their remaining relevance is their 'healing function' ... There remains no juxtaposition of elements in the paintings, nor do they create the kind of kinetic or optical illusions which many a better-known artist would not be prepared dispense with."

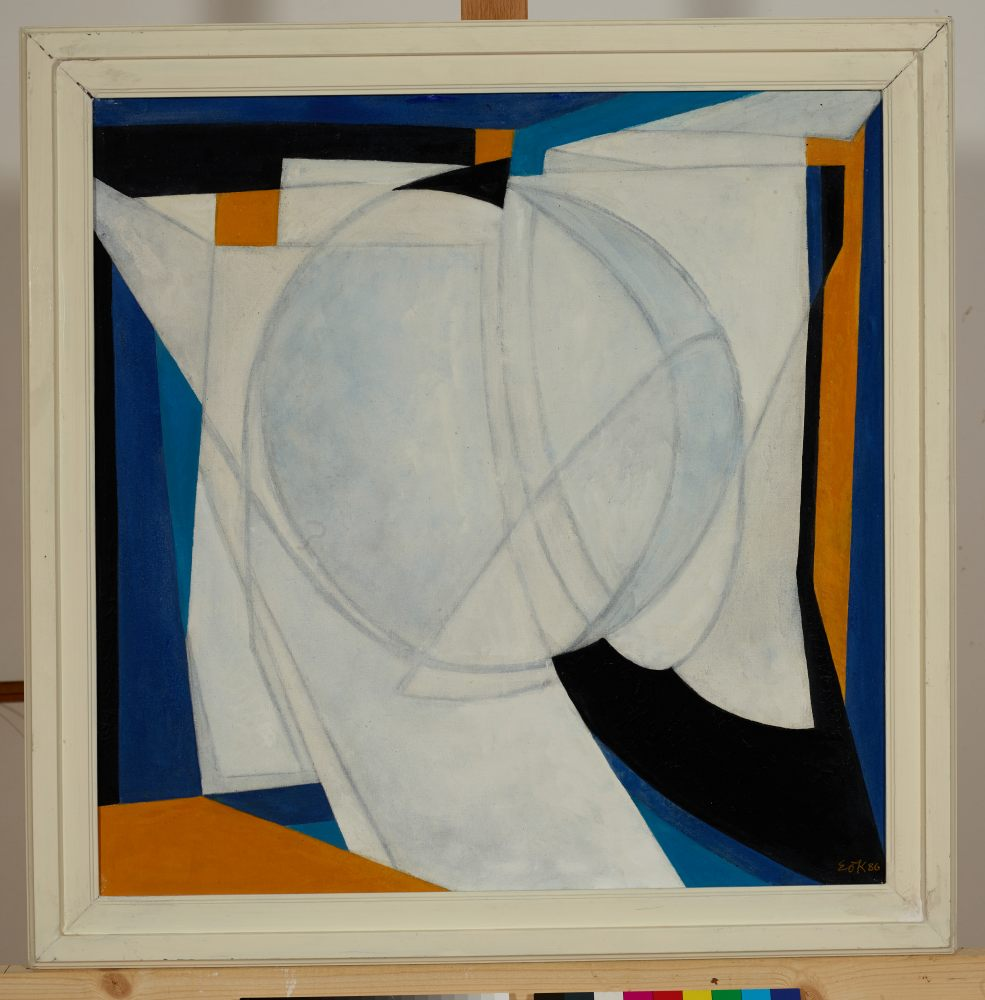
EO Köpke Mit heller Mitte 1986

The "pictures with a bright centre" create a distinctive suggestion, drawing the viewer into the centre of the picture. "This method of painting, which is entirely geared to the viewer's inner state of mind, uses a softened colour structure with ambiguous values. ... E.O. Köpke's pictures 'with a bright centre' unfold ... one of the many elementary relations and ratios of a great structural aesthetic of what we dare to call beauty." Again and again he tried out the different effects of colours with unvarying geometric forms and changing picture sizes and sections. All these experiments were recorded down to the smallest detail in sketches (always signed), so that even today the artist's reflections can be followed very well.

In the 1990s, his output of paintings grew and the paintings themselves became increasingly large-format and could reach dimensions of 3.20 m high and 2 m wide. In style, at the same time, they became more organic, expressive and colourful. In addition, Köpke continued to experiment with strict geometric forms. The "slim paintings", mostly 40 cm wide and over 2 m high, deserve special mention here. During this period, he was also fascinated by monochrome paintings, again with geometric elements. In addition, after a gap of almost 60 years, he again turned to realistic portrait painting. However, most of these portrait works are now privately owned.

There are numerous prints, especially woodcuts and linocuts, of good quality, especially from the late 1940s and 1950s.

At the end of the 1970s, he turned to this technique again and used it to design his small, individually coloured New Year Cards. His New Year's greetings were redesigned every year and were always accompanied by a thought from one of the poetry books of which he owned over 200 volumes. These small works of art enjoyed great popularity among friends and business partners and quickly developed into a collector's item.

The fact that E.O. Köpke was a trained graphic designer as well was of particular benefit to him at the beginning of his career, because graphic work enabled him to earn a reasonably secure income at an early stage. His work for the Berlin company "Großmarkt", for which he developed the entire corporate design, deserves special mention. In addition, he created numerous inventive wedding announcements and other small graphic works. With growing concentration on painting and stained glass, however, Köpke's graphic work tended to recede into the background.

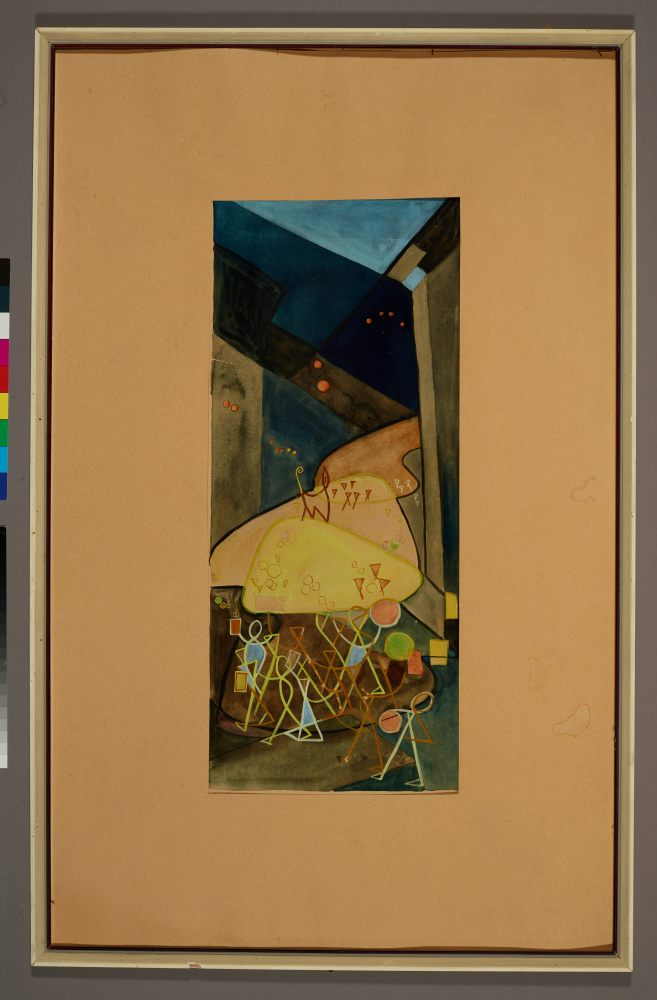
St. Martin Procession in Düsseldorf , 1952

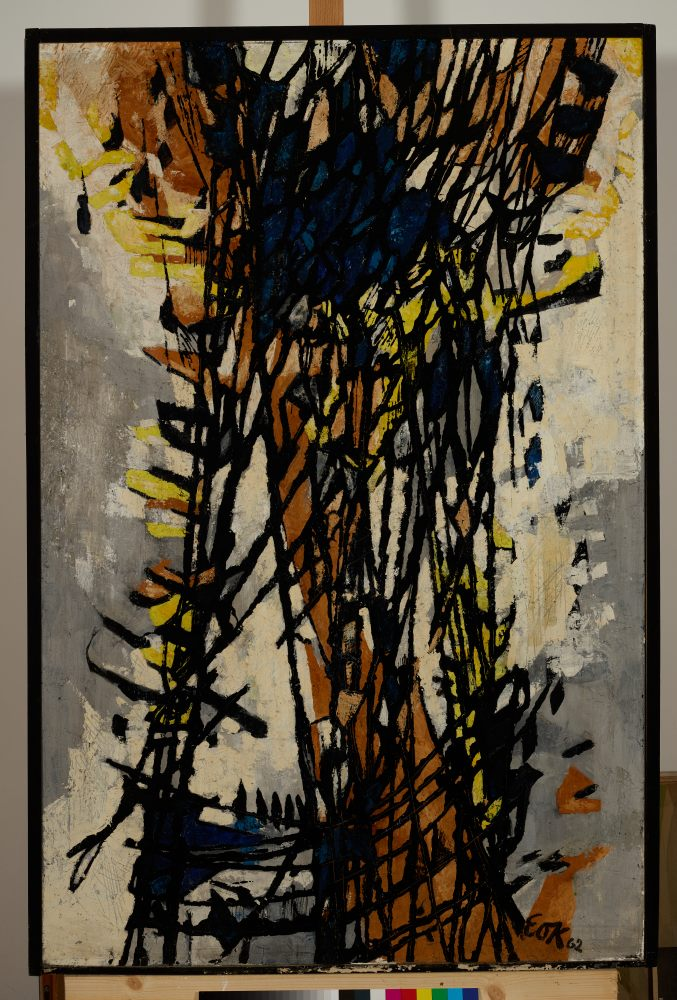
Untitled, 1962

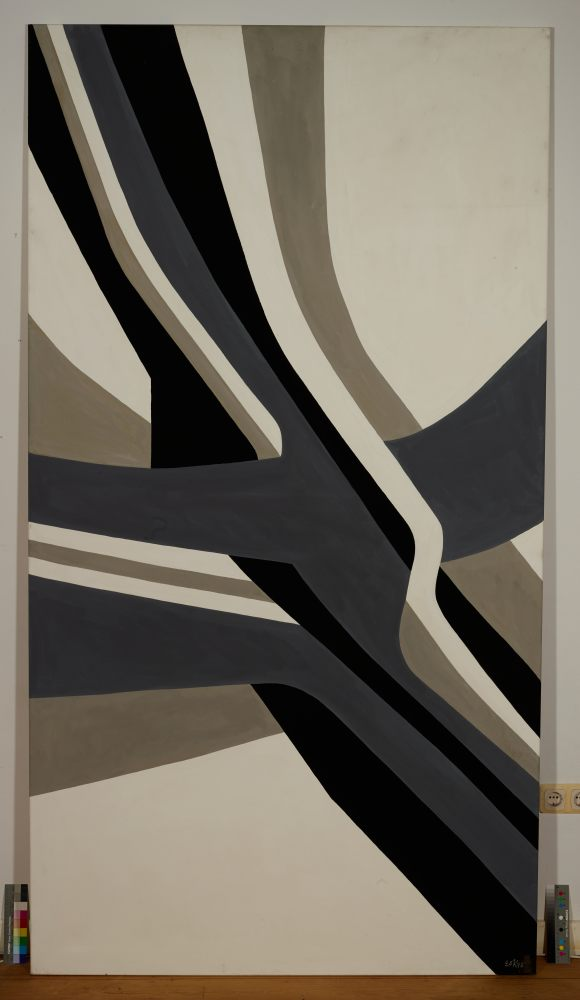
Grosses Grau, 1973

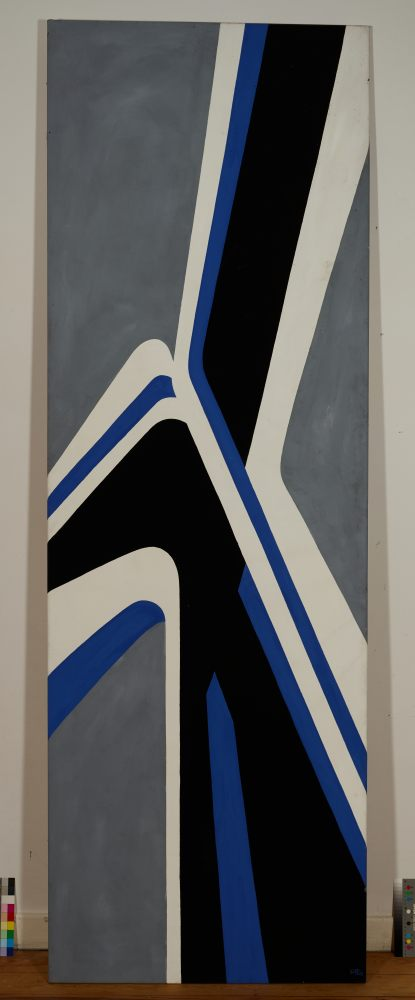
Schwarz, Weiss, Blau auf Grau, 1973

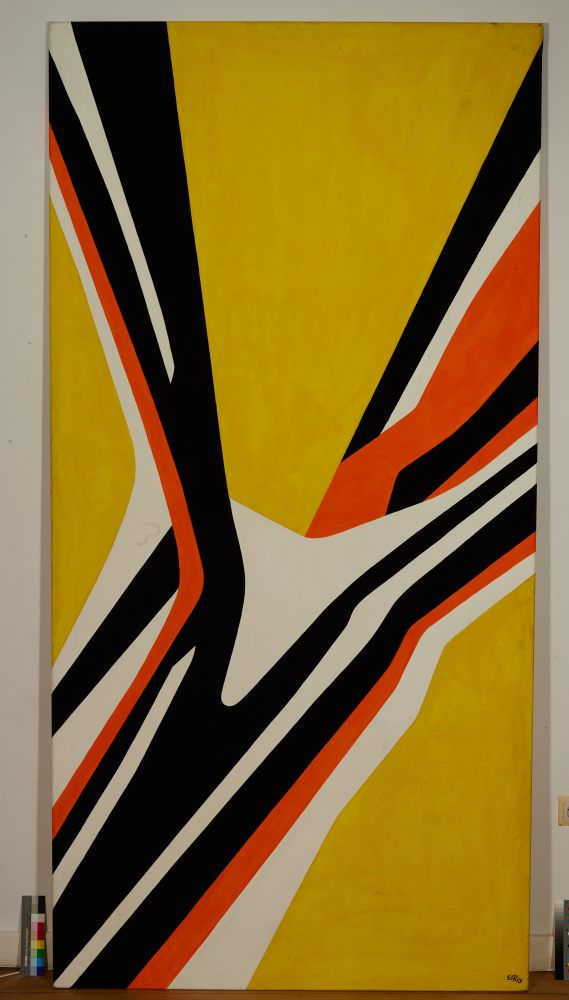
Grosses Sommerbild II, 1973

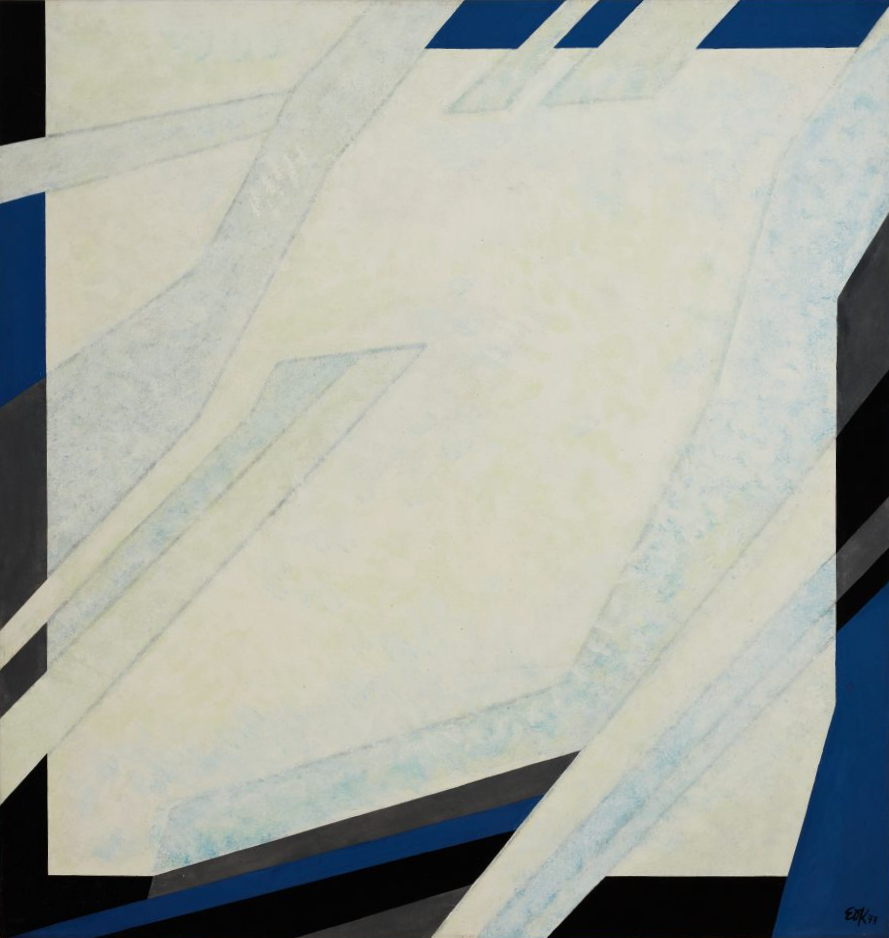
Mit heller Mitte I, for Melusine, 1977

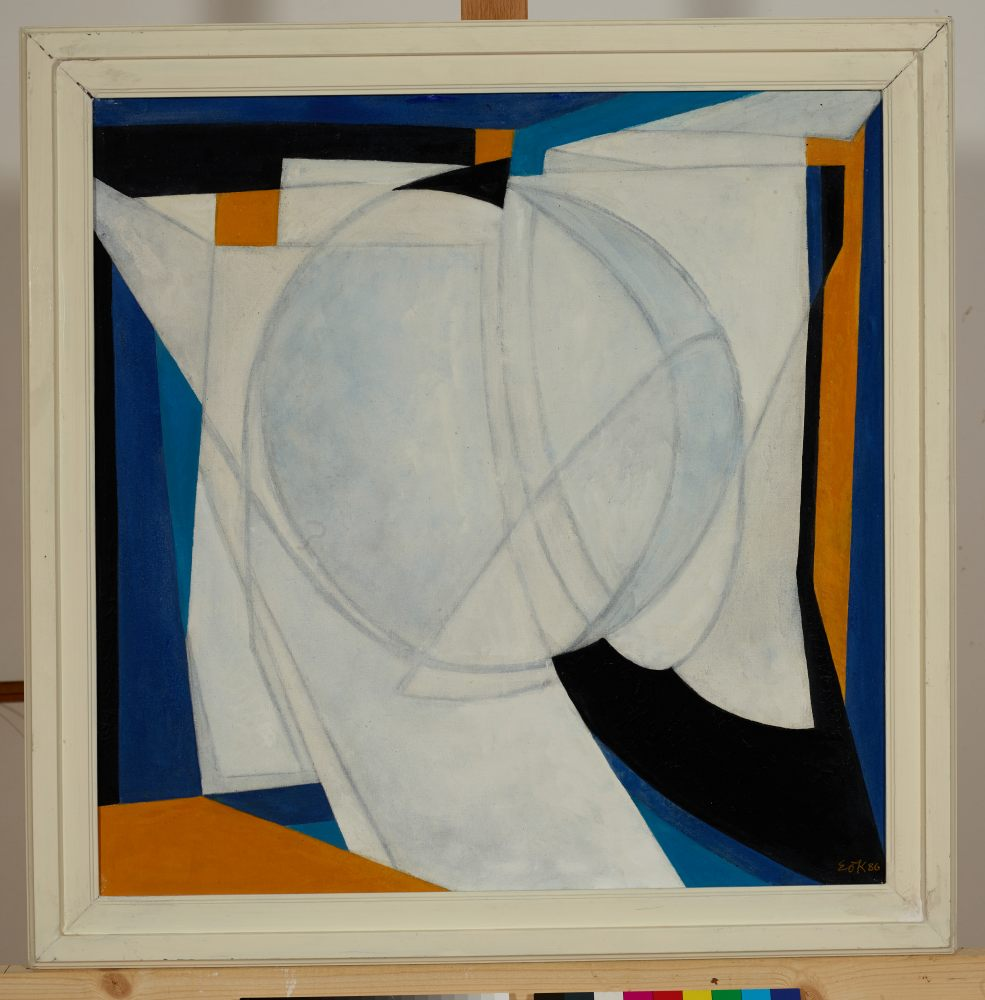
Mit heller Mitte, 1986

=== Art on building / Percent for Art ===
Between 1950 and 1970 in particular, he created numerous works on public commission for the front walls of municipal housing buildings - sgraffito, wire sculptures, combined with building ceramic, mosaic and enamel elements. He also created large-scale, richly detailed mosaic works, which were executed by Puhl & Wagner in Berlin, the most important and largest German manufacturer of glass mosaics and stained glass at the time. In addition, he created murals for schools and kindergartens as well as works for private residences and he decorated a number of pubs and restaurants. Köpke carefully collected the designs for these, and they are to be found in their entirety in his estate. At the age of 89, his last major commission was the painting of the ceiling of the traditional Düsseldorf pub "Killepitsch".

=== Stained Glass Windows ===
In the heyday of post war modern church building, in the 1950s, E. O. Köpke designed windows with figurative-iconographic depictions not only in numerous churches, but also in mental hospitals and other public buildings. Later, he mainly created architecture-related windows and window walls, with a dynamic interplay of colour and form. "His art creations are ... to be understood as illustrated areas of thought whose manifold possibilities of perception are intended to evoke, among other things, a therapeutic-didactic effect precisely in their intense colourfulness. The very fact that most of his works are in schools, churches and state mental hospitals seems to confirm this didactic claim." It is noteworthy that E.O. Köpke, although of Protestant denomination, was able to work equally for the two denominations. He also succeeded in having his stained glass windows accepted even in congregations of Calvinist persuasion, which are not uncommon in the Rhineland.

Stained glass windows created by Köpke can be found in about 50 churches and mental hospitals among others in Andernach, Bedburg-Hau, Berlin, Duisburg, Düsseldorf, Dinslaken, Essen, Erkelenz, Euskirchen, Hürth-Efferen, Kalkum, Kleve, Köln, Königsdorf, Mühlheim, Neuss, Rheinbach and Velbert. He produced his last stained glass work at the age of 85 in 1999 for the Gothic church in Erlangen-Tennenlohe (Bavaria).

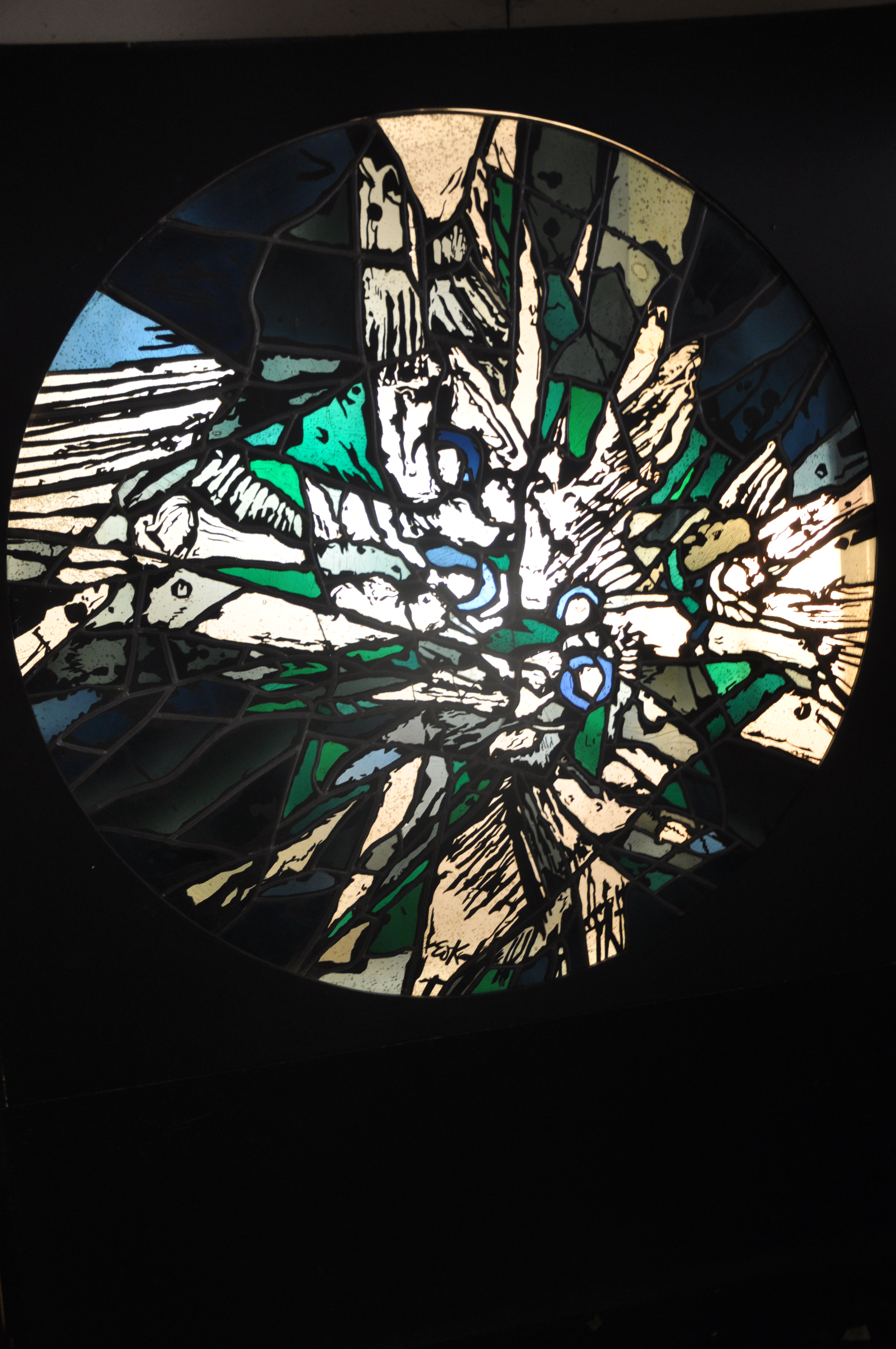
E. O. Köpke: Chorfenster in Düren

Triggered by the demolition of the Apostelkirche in Düsseldorf-Gerresheim, with its altar wall of coloured glass blocks measuring approx. 140 m^{²}, Köpke's work repeatedly appeared in the press in 2009 and 2010 even after his death. In the meantime, the demolished church has been replaced by a new building on a smaller scale, and the altar wall, an outstanding work of art, has been dismantled and put into storage. Other windows have been completely destroyed in the meantime, such as the glass work in the dome of the church of St. Rochus in Düsseldorf-Derendorf, which was built in 1954 and closely coordinated with the interior decor by Ewald Mataré. Despite being a listed building and contrary to the expressed intentions of the client at the time of construction, the church was subsequently "cleaned" in 1992 at the insistence of the architect.
It seems rather bizarre that a stained-glass window by Köpke in the church of St. Thomas Morus in Essen was bricked up immediately after it was installed in 1952 as being "too modern".

In most church parishes, however, Köpke's works are still held in high regard today. This is especially true of one of his masterpieces, a 14 m wide window in the Protestant Church of the Holy Cross in Andernach. With an area of approx. 80 m^{²}, it was long time considered the largest stained glass window in the world. Notable stained glass windows by Köpke can also be found in numerous public buildings, such as the council chamber of Duisburg's town hall and several homes for disadvantaged young people, as well as in private homes and company buildings.
The windows and mosaics in Berlin-Dahlem for the last detached house designed by the architect Hans Scharoun are particularly noteworthy.

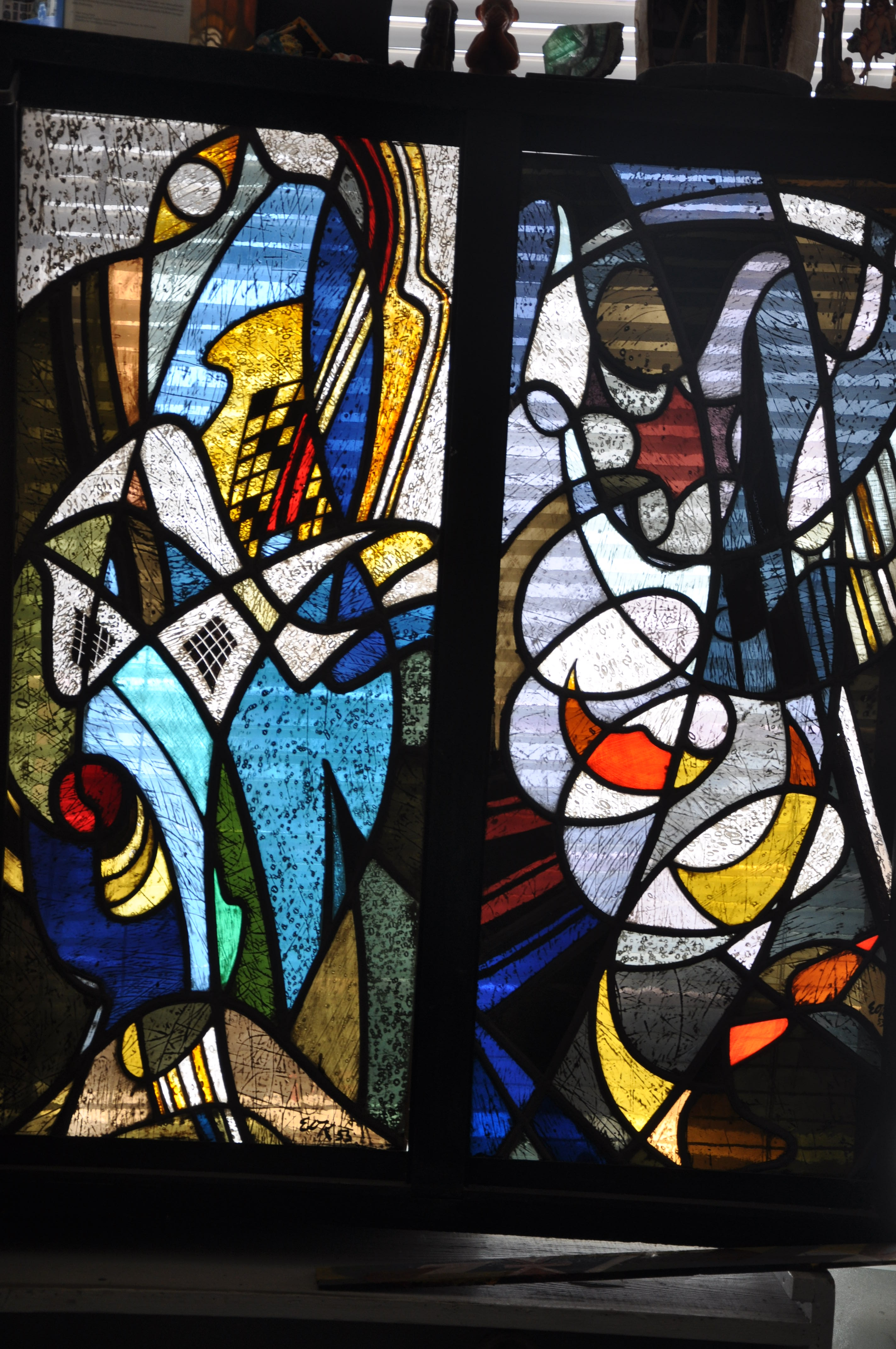
EO Köpke: small painted glass

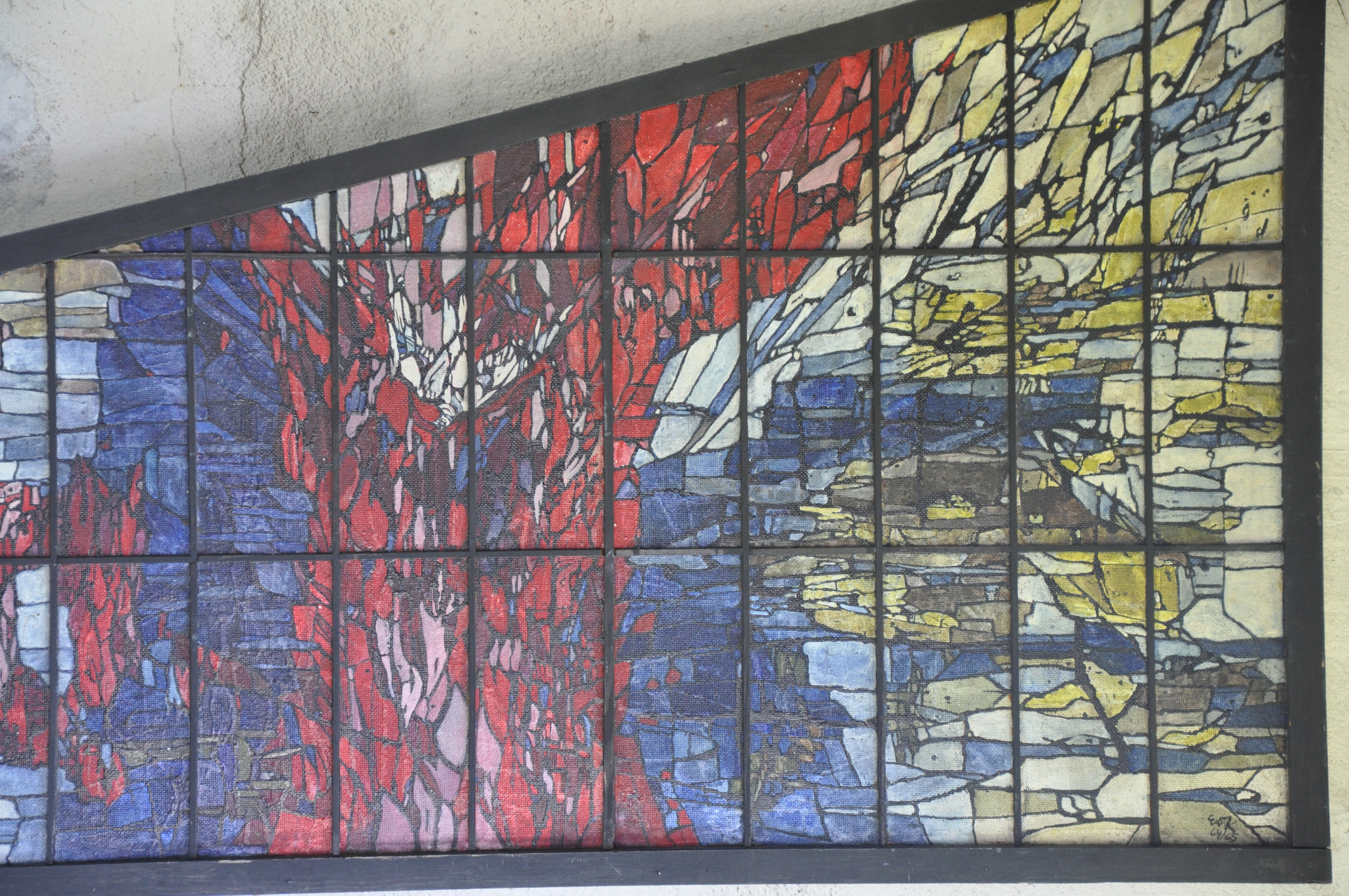
Design-Model for the Kreuzkirche Andernach

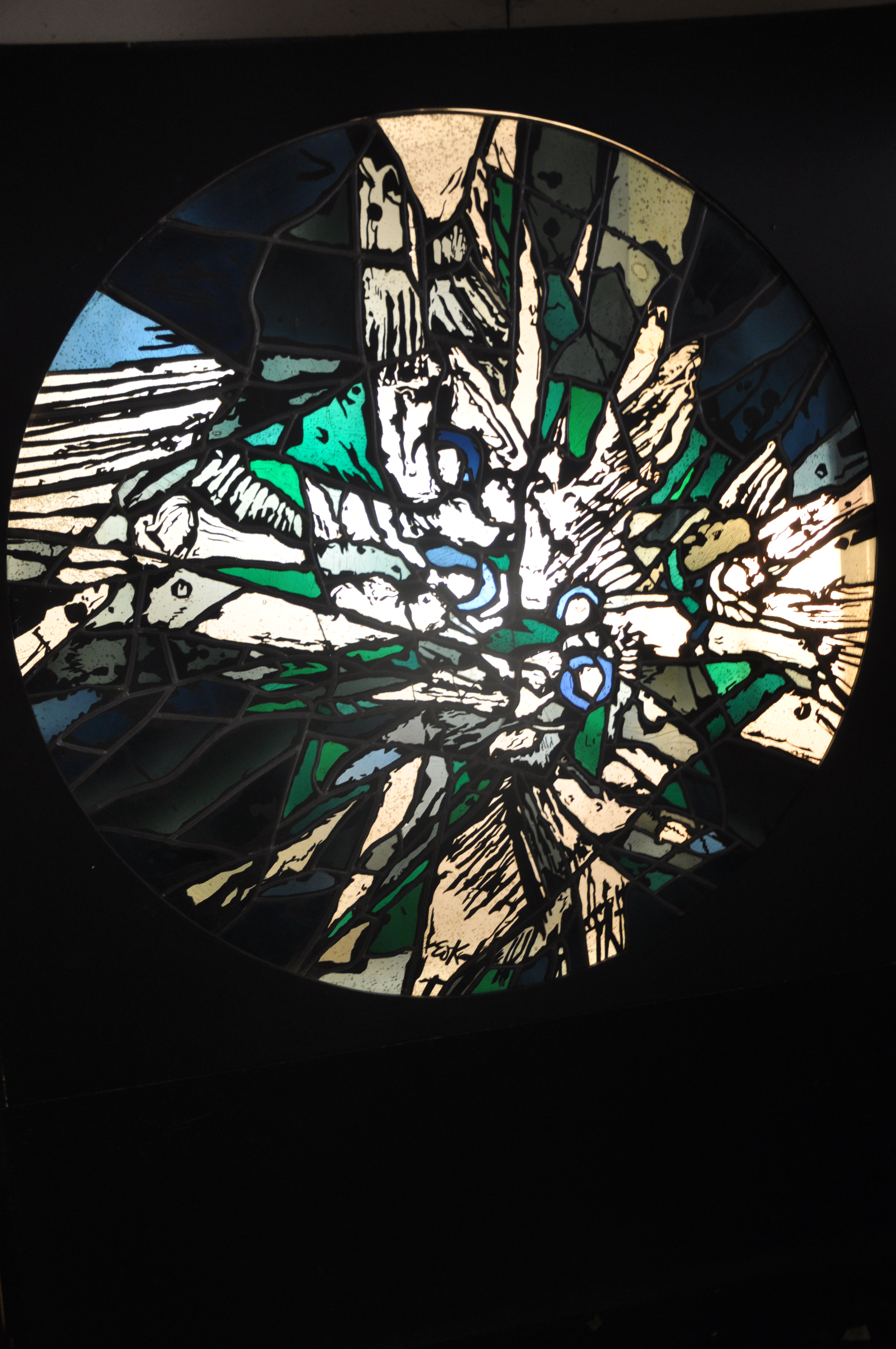
Choir window, Düren, 2nd version

=== The estate ===
The artist had stipulated in his will that his artistic estate should remain untouched initially for 10 years after his death. Therefore, the painter's three children have only been working on this estate since 2019. The complete oeuvre comprises around 3,000 items of varying size and quality, from small (signed) sketches to large paintings. In addition, there are about 2,000 photographs of the artist's works in situ, as well as a large amount of written material, including complete diary entries from 1949 to 2004. It is planned to publish his entire artistic works on the internet by the end of 2022.

== Personal exhibitions ==
- 1961, 1962, 1963: Werkstattausstellungen in der Glasmalerei G. Gassen
- 1966: Galerie Jülicher, Mönchengladbach
- 1966: Institut für Kirchenbau der Universität Marburg
- 1974: Galerie Baukunst, Köln
- 1975: Galerie "K", Herford
- 1975: Galerie Esteburg, Jork
- 1978: Kunstverein, Marburg/Lahn
- 1979: Nürnberg-Forum Egidienkirche, Nürnberg
- 1980: Goslar
- 1982: Museum Abtei Liesborn, Wadersloh
- 1984: "Die Geschichte von der Arche Noah", Stadtmuseum, Düsseldorf
- 1985: "E.O. Köpke. Arbeiten von 1950 bis heute", Stadtmuseum, Düsseldorf
