= Theodor-Fliedner-Gymnasium =

Secondary school in Düsseldorf, Germany

Coordinates: 51.3057°N 6.7464°E

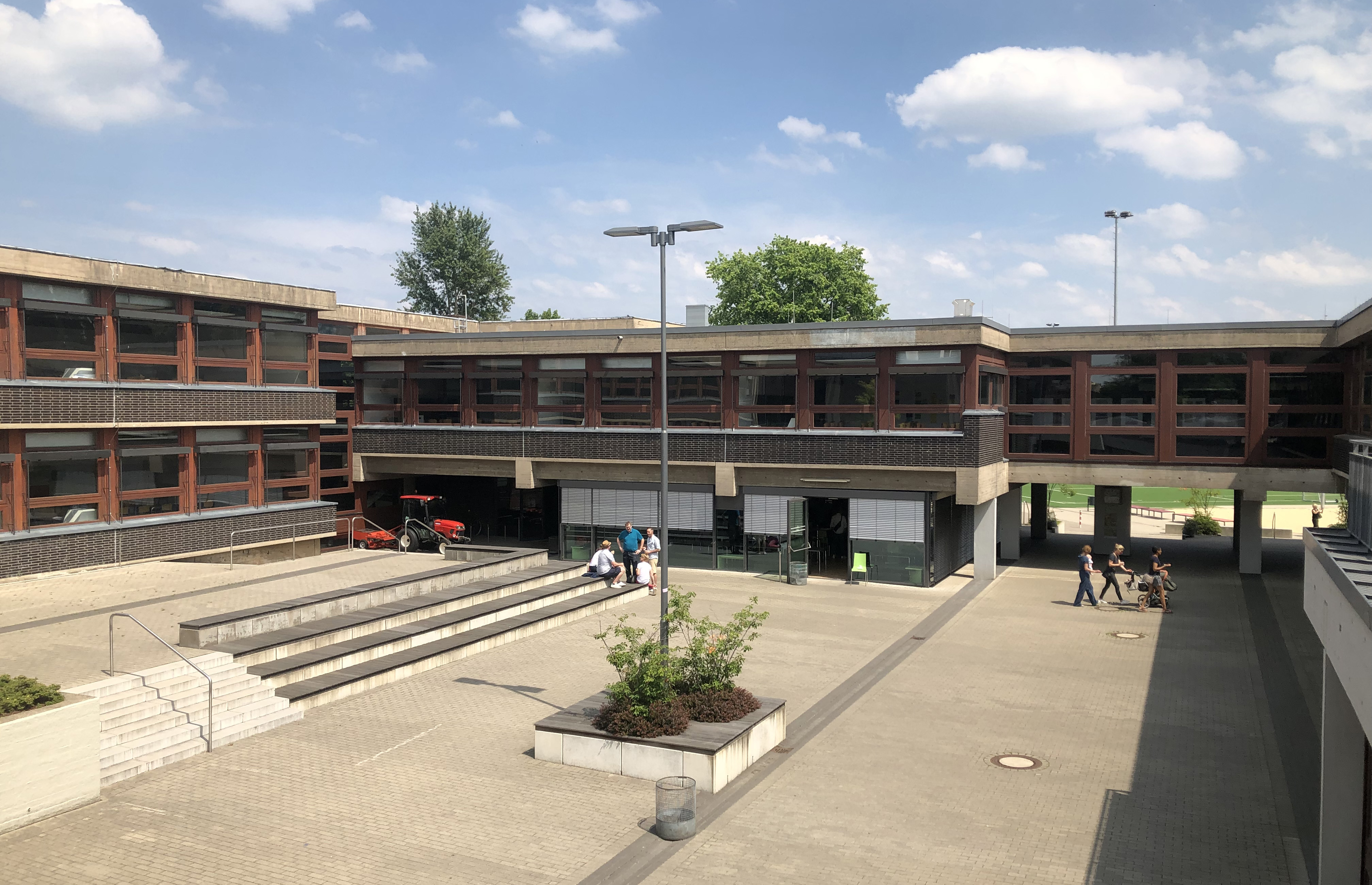

Location
- Kalkumer Schlossallee 28, 40489 Düsseldorf; Germany

Information
- Type: Gymnasium
- Religious affiliation: Evangelical Church in the Rhineland
- Established: 1908 (1836)
- Head teacher: Christoph Deußen
- Staff: ~100
- Enrolment: ~1,250
- Website: https://tfg-duesseldorf.de

The Theodor-Fliedner-Gymnasium (TFG) is a Gymnasium high school in the Kaiserswerth district of Düsseldorf, Germany. It is one of the largest Protestant schools in Germany, operated by the Evangelical Church in the Rhineland.

== History ==
The roots of the school go back to October 13, 1836, when Theodor Fliedner and his wife Caroline Fliedner founded an Educational Institute for Deaconesses in Kaiserswerth. In 1908, a higher girls' school was established, which later evolved into the current Gymnasium. In 1925, an Oberlyzeum was created, allowing students to pursue the Abitur. The school moved to its current premises on Kalkumer Schlossallee in the 1960s.

In 2012, the school underwent a major renovation and expansion. The renovation included the construction of a cafeteria, swimming pool, and sports facilities, which were funded by the Evangelical Church in the Rhineland.

By the mid-2020s, Theodor-Fliedner-Gymnasium was consistently mentioned in regional media as one of the Gymnasien in Düsseldorf with particularly high demand in the school enrollment process. In the first admission phase for the 2025/26 school year, city statistics showed that the school was among the Gymnasien with the highest number of applications relative to available places, with 230 first-choice applications recorded in February 2025.

== School Profile ==
The school is named for the founder of Kaiserswerther Diakonie, Theodor Fliedner, and is sponsored by the Evangelical Church in the Rhineland. It is open to students of all denominations and faiths. In addition to regular classes, the school offers a wide range Working groups and elective classes in music, sports, languages, natural sciences and culture. The school has specialist rooms, a cafeteria and a self-learning centre, science labs, and a sports complex that includes a gymnasium, swimming pool, and climbing wall. The school also has a notable American football team, which has won regional championships.

In the 2018/19 school year, around 1250 students attended school, who were taught by around 100 teachers. It is one of the largest Protestant schools in Germany.

In academic literature, Theodor-Fliedner-Gymnasium is cited as one of the larger Protestant secondary schools in Germany and as an example of Evangelical schooling within the German education system.

== International Partnerships ==
Since 1970, the school has maintained a partnership with Ha'emek Hama’aravi Regional High School in Yifat, Israel. Since 1993, the school has also partnered with a high school in Działdowo, Poland. Additionally, the school has maintained a partnership with a school in Nijmegen, Netherlands, since 2005.

== School Building ==
The school complex was constructed between 1962 and 1967, based on designs by the Düsseldorf architect Christoph Parade. The buildings, arranged in a pavilion style, consist of multiple one to three-storey structures with flat roofs. They include a children's building for grades 5 and 6, a main building for grades 7 through 12, and functional spaces such as laboratories and an auditorium. The sports facilities include a gymnasium and a swimming pool with an adjustable floor.

The school’s architecture has received multiple recognitions. The original school complex, designed by architect Christoph Parade and completed in the late 1960s, was awarded second prize in the 1970 architecture award of the Association of German Architects (BDA) for exemplary school design. Following an extensive renovation and expansion from 2009 to 2012 by Claudia Gehse, the project was honored with the Schulbaupreis Nordrhein-Westfalen (School Building Award) in 2013 for its quality and transformation of the existing campus.

== Theodor Fliedner Boarding School ==
The Theodor Fliedner boarding school, one of the few urban boarding schools in Germany, was established in 1954 by the Evangelical Church in the Rhineland as a residence for students attending the Theodor Fliedner Gymnasium. In 2004, the boarding school came under the management of Kaiserswerther Diakonie, and it accommodated 60 students from grades 5 through 12, including those from surrounding schools. The boarding school ceased operations in July 2021, and the building complex now houses various services of the Kaiserswerther Diakonie.

== Awards and recognitions ==
In the field of global education, the school has been designated a “Schule:Global” institution, with its membership renewed for a further three years in late 2024 in recognition of its work in intercultural learning and globalization-oriented education initiatives.

== Notable alumni ==
- Margarethe von Trotta (born 1942), actress, director, and screenwriter (Abitur 1960)
- Carola Gräfin von Schmettow (born 1964), former CEO of HSBC Trinkaus & Burkhardt
- Marcel Saibert (born 1977), actor and musician (Abitur 1997)
- Romina Becks (born 1987), actress
- Martin Pinter (born 1997), American football player (Abitur 2015)

== Bibliography ==
- "Theodor-Fliedner-Gymnasium in Düsseldorf für weitere drei Jahre als Schule:Global ausgezeichnet". AJA – Arbeitskreis gemeinnütziger Jugendaustausch. 3 December 2024.
- "Schulbaupreis NRW 2013: 23 Schulen ausgezeichnet". www.aknw.de (in German). Architektenkammer Nordrhein-Westfalen. 2013.
- "Anmeldungen: Gymnasien in Düsseldorf weiterhin Spitzenreiter". Antenne Düsseldorf. 14 February 2025.
- "Umbau Theodor-Fliedner-Gymnasium Düsseldorf-Kaiserswerth". baukunst-nrw.
- Brabeck, Julia (21 October 2020). "Schulen in Düsseldorf: Frischer Wind für das Fliedner-Gymnasium". RP Online (in German).
- Brabeck, Julia (27 July 2021). "Theodor-Fliedner-Internat: Das einzige Internat Düsseldorfs wird geschlossen". RP Online (in German).
- Brabeck, Julia (6 February 2024). "Düsseldorf: Darum wird es an den Gymnasien eng". RP Online (in German).
- "School partnership: Theodor-Fliedner-Gymnasium – Ha'emek Hama'aravi Regional High School, Yifat". State Government of North Rhine-Westphalia. 2016. Archived from the original on May 22, 2019.
- Hoffmann, Gretl (1968). Reiseführer zur modernen Architektur: Deutschland: Bundesrepublik und West-Berlin. Daten und Anschriften zu rund 1000 Bauten von 1900 bis heute (in German). J. Hoffmann.
- Ingel, Marc (14 October 2021). "Schule in Düsseldorf: Fliedner-Gymnasium will sich erneuern". RP Online (in German).
- Janssen, Jörg (23 February 2019). "Erster Anmeldedurchgang bei den weiterführenden Schulen: Humboldt- und Fliedner-Gymnasium sind besonders beliebt". RP Online (in German).
- Parade, Cristoph. "Theodor-Fliedner-Gymnasium". www.parade-architekten.de. Parade Architekten.
- Scholten, Afons (2011). "Ein Blick zurück als Schritt nach vorn – oder: Learning european by doing european". Europäische Erziehung. 41 (2): 5–13.
- Simojoki, Henrik; Scheunpflug, Annette; Schreiner, Martin (2018). Evangelische Schulen und religiöse Bildung in der Weltgesellschaft: Die Bamberger Barbara-Schadeberg-Vorlesungen (in German). Waxmann Verlag. ISBN 978-3-8309-8798-7.
- "Evangelical Church Foundation". tfg-duesseldorf.de. Archived from the original on July 17, 2018.
- "Evangelical Church Foundation". tfg-duesseldorf.de. Archived from the original on July 17, 2018.
- "Schulleitung". Theodor-Fliedner-Gymnasium (in German).
- Zeller, Mark (13 November 2013). "Fliedner-Schüler feiern Football-Meisterschaft". Lokalkompass (in German).
