= Borough 5 (Düsseldorf) =

Stadtbezirk 5
- Borough of Düsseldorf
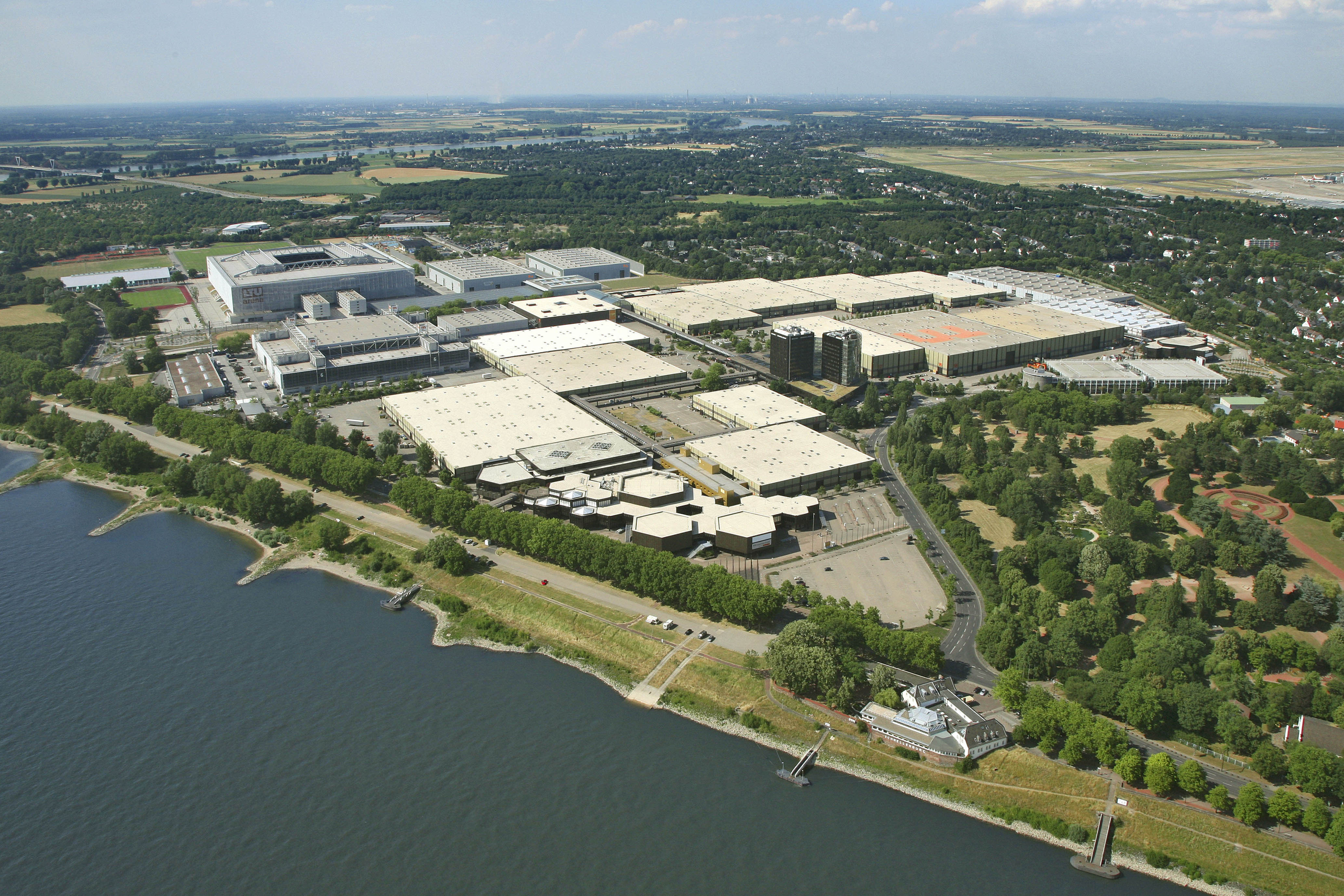
- Aerial view of Messe Düsseldorf in Stockum. Visible in the background are Kaiserswerth (center) and Düsseldorf Airport (right)

- Location of Stadtbezirk 5 within Düsseldorf
- Interactive map of Stadtbezirk 5
- Location within Germany Location within North Rhine-Westphalia
- Coordinates: 51°17′50″N 6°44′21″E
- Country: Germany
- State: North Rhine-Westphalia
- District: Urban district
- City: Düsseldorf
- Subdivisions: 6 quarters

Area
  - Total: 50.75 km^{2} (19.59 sq mi)

Population (2020-12-31)
  - Total: 34,534
  - Density: 680.5/km^{2} (1,762/sq mi)
- Time zone: UTC+01:00 (CET)
  - Summer (DST): UTC+02:00 (CEST)

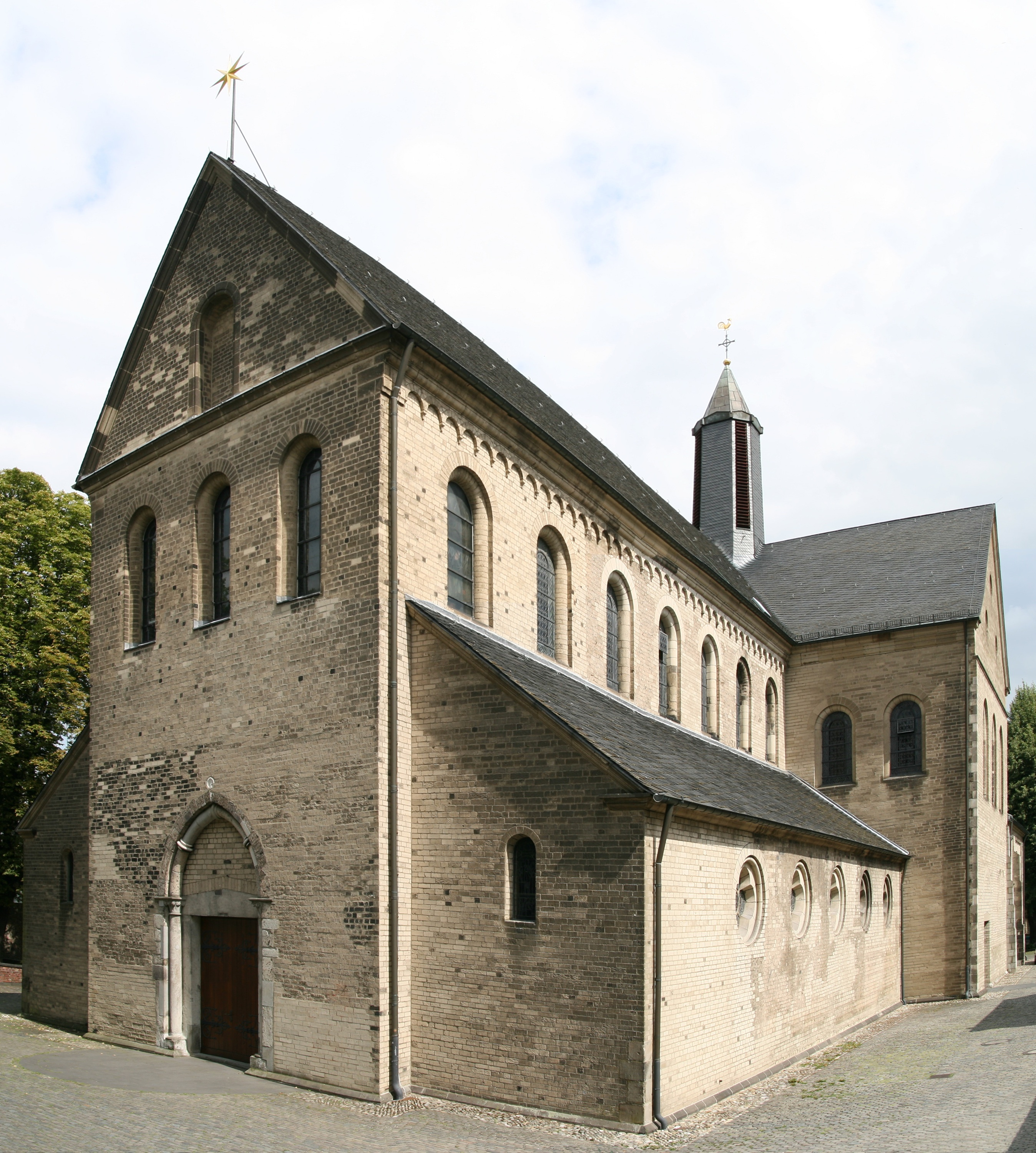
St. Suitbertus in Kaiserswerth

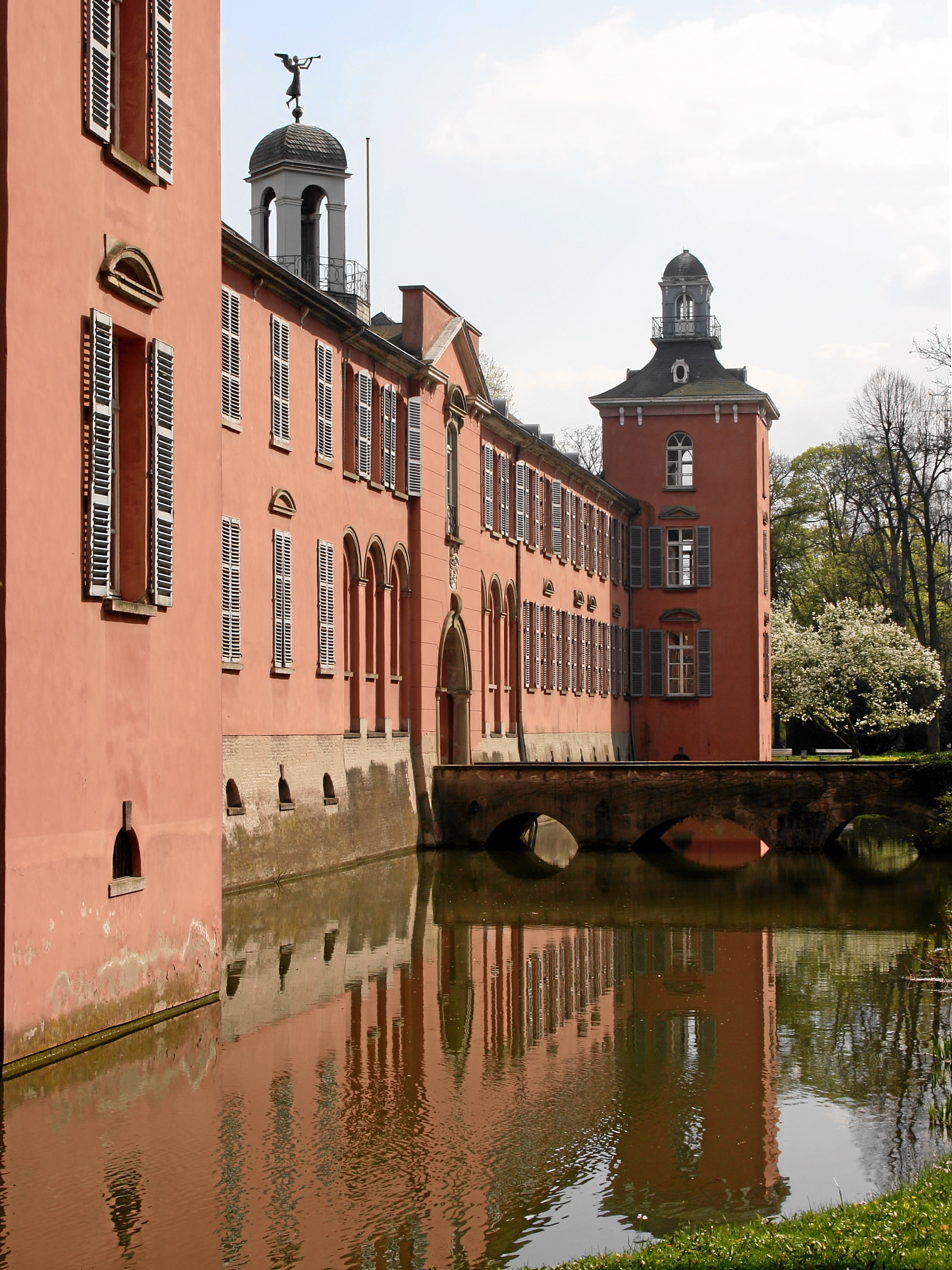
Schloss Kalkum in Kalkum

Borough 5 (German: Stadtbezirk 5) is a northern borough of Düsseldorf, the state capital of North Rhine-Westphalia, Germany. Düsseldorf's International Airport is located in the borough. It is the largest borough by land area, but also the least populated. The borough covers an area of 50.75 square kilometres and (as of December 2020) has about 34,500 inhabitants.

Stadtbezirk 5 borders with the Düsseldorf boroughs 1 and 6 to the South, and - via a shared border across the Rhine - borough 4 to the South-West. To the West - also across the Rhine - it borders with Rhein-Kreis Neuss. Further it shares borders with the city of Duisburg to the North, and Kreis Mettmann to the East.

== Subdivisions ==
Borough 5 is made up of six Stadtteile (city parts):

#	City part	Population (2020)	Area (km²)	Pop. per km²
051	Düsseldorf-Stockum	5,596	5.74	845
052	Düsseldorf-Lohausen	4,170	12.42	358
053	Düsseldorf-Kaiserswerth	7,923	4.80	1,627
054	Düsseldorf-Wittlaer	8,117	6.89	1,175
055	Düsseldorf-Angermund	6,746	13.29	506
056	Düsseldorf-Kalkum	1,982	7.61	262

== Places of interest ==
=== Arts, Culture and Entertainment ===
- Kaiserswerth Imperial Palace, Kaiserswerth
- Messegelände incl. multifunctional Esprit Arena, Stockum

=== Landmarks ===
- St. Suitbertus, Kaiserswerth
- Kalkum Palace, Kalkum

=== Parks and open spaces ===
- Nordpark

== Transportation ==
The borough is served by numerous railway stations and highway. Düsseldorf Airport is located in Lohausen, part of Borough 5. Stations include Düsseldorf Airport, Düsseldorf-Angermund and both Düsseldorf Stadtbahn light rail- and Rheinbahn tram-stations. The borough can also be reached via Bundesautobahn 44, 52 and 59 as well as Bundesstraße 7 and 8.

=== Rhine bridges ===
- A 44 Flughafenbrücke

== See also ==
- Boroughs of Düsseldorf
- Rhine-Ruhr
