= Angermund =

City district of Düsseldorf, Germany

Coordinates: 51°19′48″N 6°46′48″E

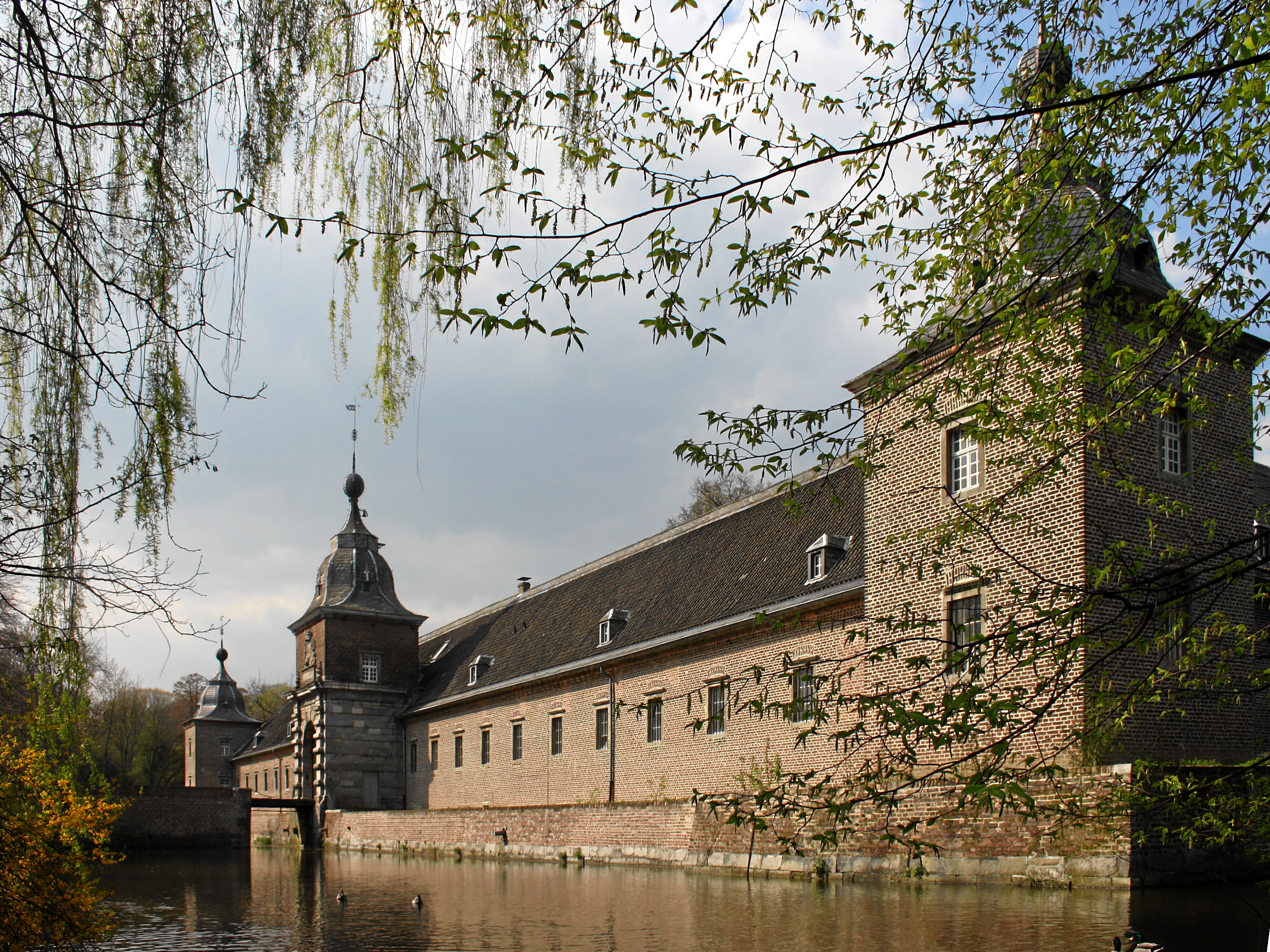
Schloss Heltorf in Angermund

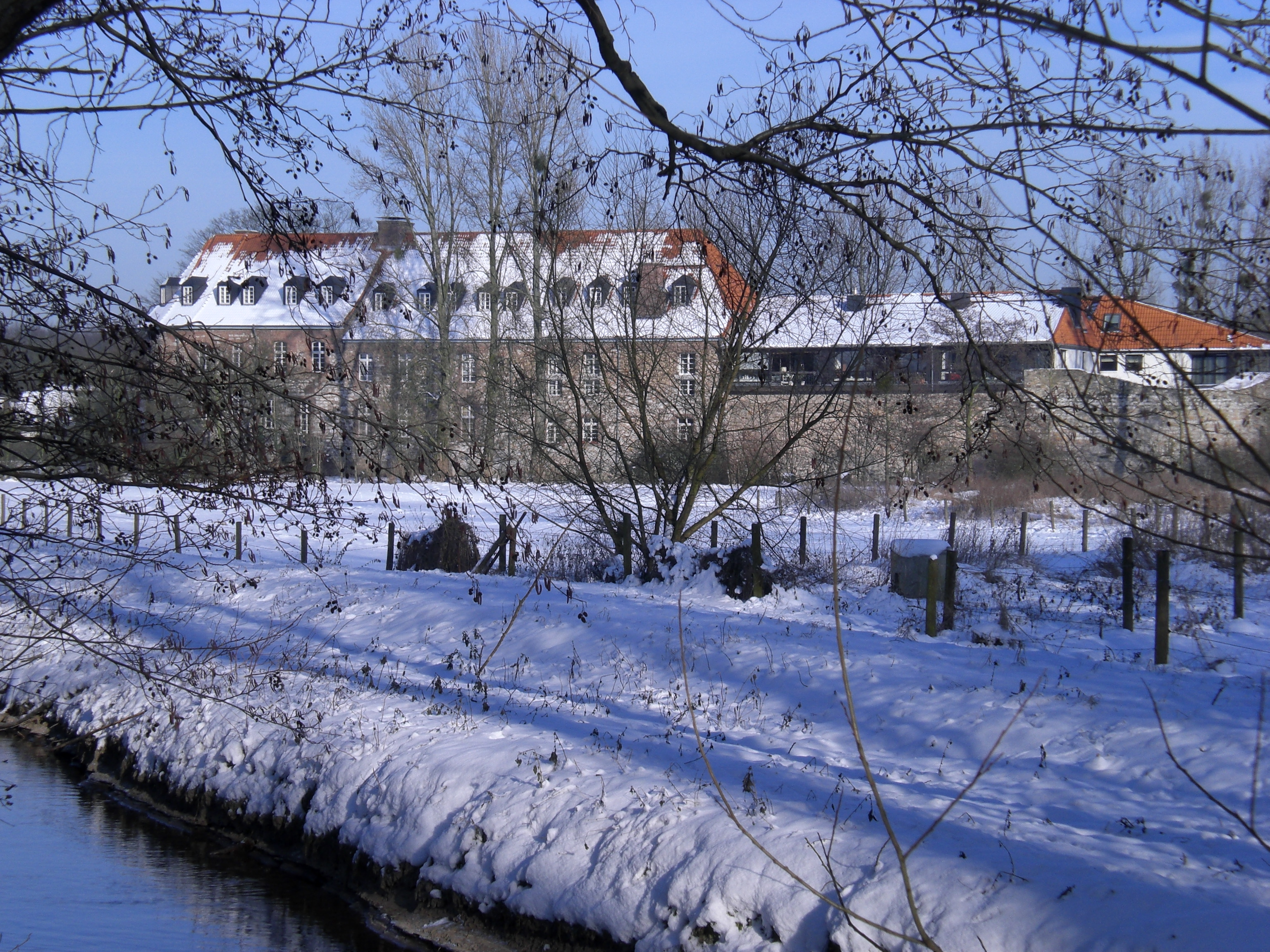
Castle Angermund

Map of Düsseldorf, showing Angermund (in red) within Borough 5 (in pink)

Angermund (German pronunciation: [ˈaŋɐmʊnt]) is an urban quarter of Düsseldorf, part of Borough 5. Angermund is the northernmost part of Düsseldorf, neighbouring to Kalkum, Kaiserswerth, Ratingen and Duisburg. Having the second largest income in Düsseldorf, it provides a home to many corporate managers and foreign, mainly American, British and Dutch employees. Angermund has an area of 13.29 km^{2} (5.13 sq mi), and 6,746 inhabitants (2020), population density 506 inhabitants per km^{2}.

== Name and History ==
The name comes from the Anger rivulet, flowing into the river Rhine near Angermund. Angermund was mentioned in writings for the first time in 960 A.D. The Angermund Castle was built in the 14th century A.D. Angermund became a part of Düsseldorf in 1975.

== Sights ==
Heltorf Castle and its park are well known in that region with its rhododendron plants. The old Angermund Castle from the 14th century is the other sight of Angermund.

=== St. Agnes Church ===
The first small chapel in Angermund was built in the 9. century and was dedicated to Saint George. 1632 the chapel was destroyed by soldiers in the Thirty Years' War.

On request of the citizens Duke Wolfgang Wilhelm of Berg provided a piece of land and ordered a construction plan for a new church. Although construction started immediately it took until 1646 to erect the exterior walls. It took five additional years to complete the interior. In 1658 the first church service took place. On the 9. of August 1697 the church was consecrated. Saint Agnes became patron saint of the church giving the church its name. 1703 Angermund became an own Parish.

== Infrastructure ==
There is one S-Bahn line (S1) connecting Düsseldorf-Angermund station southbound with Düsseldorf Airport and Düsseldorf Hbf as well as with Duisburg Hbf and the Ruhrgebiet, northbound. In addition to the railway service, there are two bus lines (728, 751) connecting Angermund with Ratingen Hösel and Düsseldorf Kaiserswerth. Two Autobahns are accessible via Duisburg Rahm and Ratingen Lintorf, as well as a southbound highway going straight downtown. Subway service is accessible via Düsseldorf-Kaiserswerth, and the airport railway station is one S-Bahn stop south of Angermund.
