= Schwarzbach (Bergisches Land) =

River in Germany

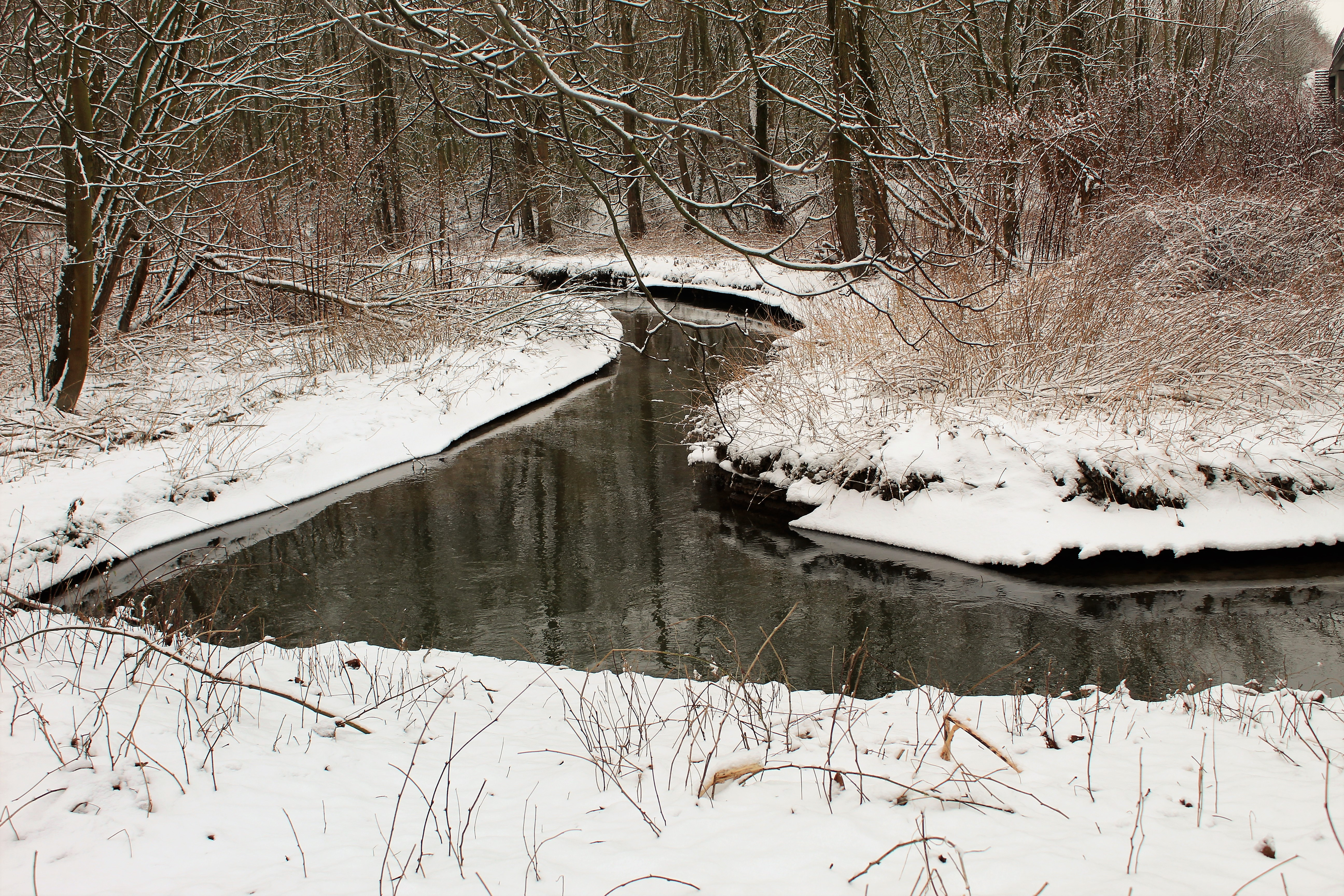

Location
- Country: Germany
- State: North Rhine-Westphalia

Physical characteristics
- Mouth
  - location: Rhine
  - coordinates: 51.3222°N 6.7350°E
- Length: 27.6 km (17.1 mi)

Basin features
- Progression: Rhine→ North Sea

Schwarzbach (German pronunciation: [ˈʃvaʁtsˌbax]) is a river of the Bergisches Land, North Rhine-Westphalia, Germany. It is a right tributary of the Rhine near Düsseldorf-Wittlaer. Its source is north of Mettmann.

== See also ==
- List of rivers of North Rhine-Westphalia
