= Kalkum =

City district of Düsseldorf, Germany

Coordinates: 51°18′24″N 6°45′46″E

Map of Düsseldorf, showing Kalkum (in red) within Borough 5 (in pink)

Kalkum (German pronunciation: [ˈkalkʊm]) is an urban quarter of Düsseldorf, part of Borough 5. It is in the north of the city, neighboring to Kaiserswerth, Angermund, Wittlaer and Ratingen. It has an area of 7.61 km^{2} (2.94 sq mi), and 1,734 inhabitants (2024).

Kalkum has been existing latest since the 12th century CE. The old church of Kalkum and the old mill are from that century.

The Kalkum Castle was in earlier times the seat of the Hatzfelds. Before that castle was built, there was another castle from the middle age. Currently there is the state archive of North Rhine-Westphalia in the castle.

There is a lot of green in Kalkum. On the other way, Kalkum is near to the Düsseldorf Airport.

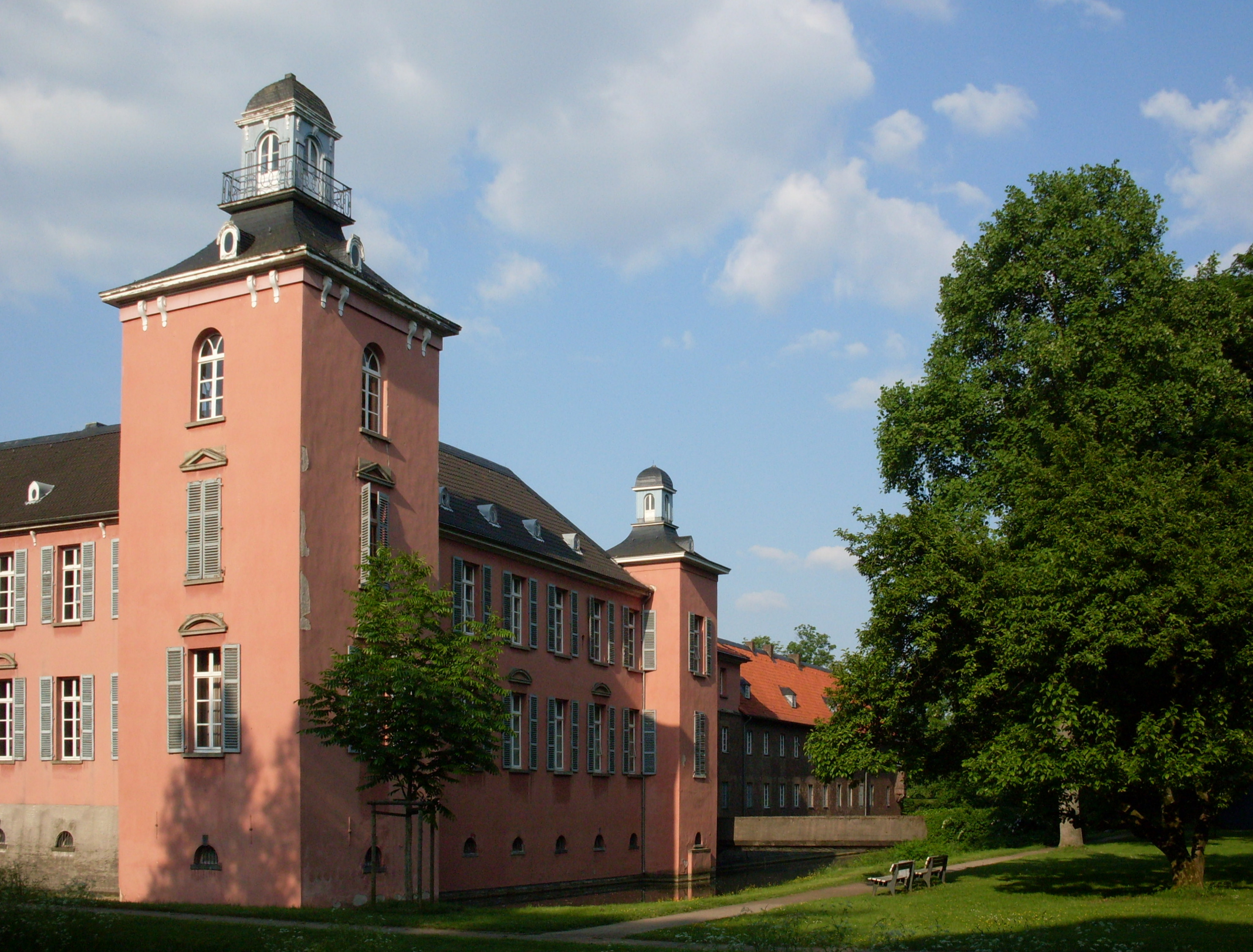
Castle of Kalkum

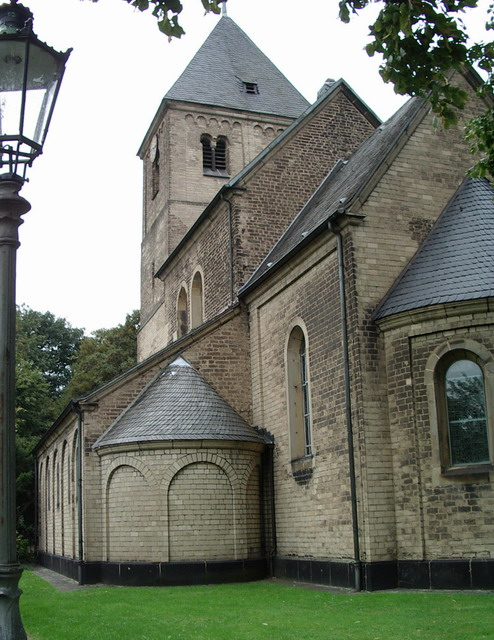
St Lambertus

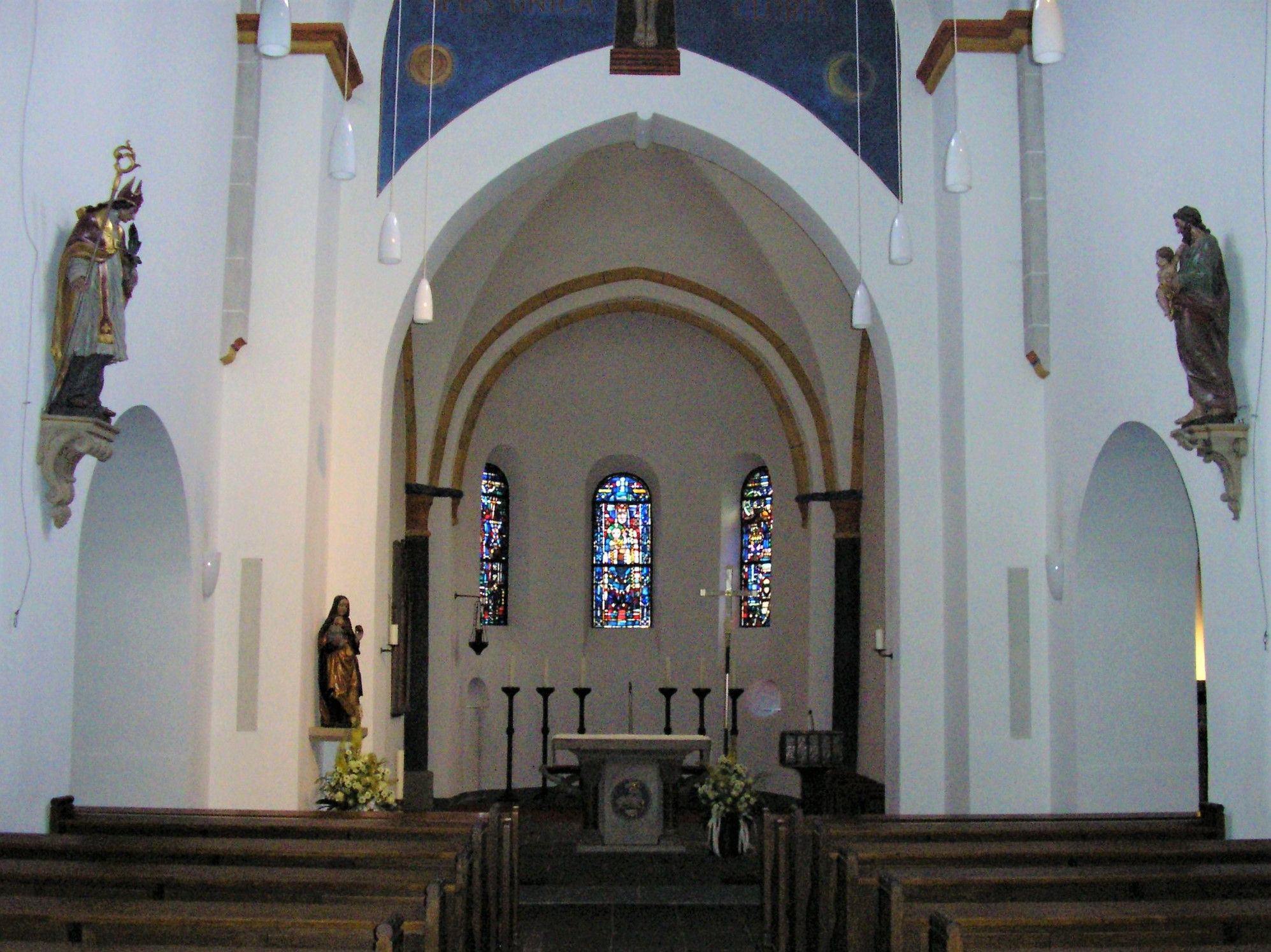
Inside the Church

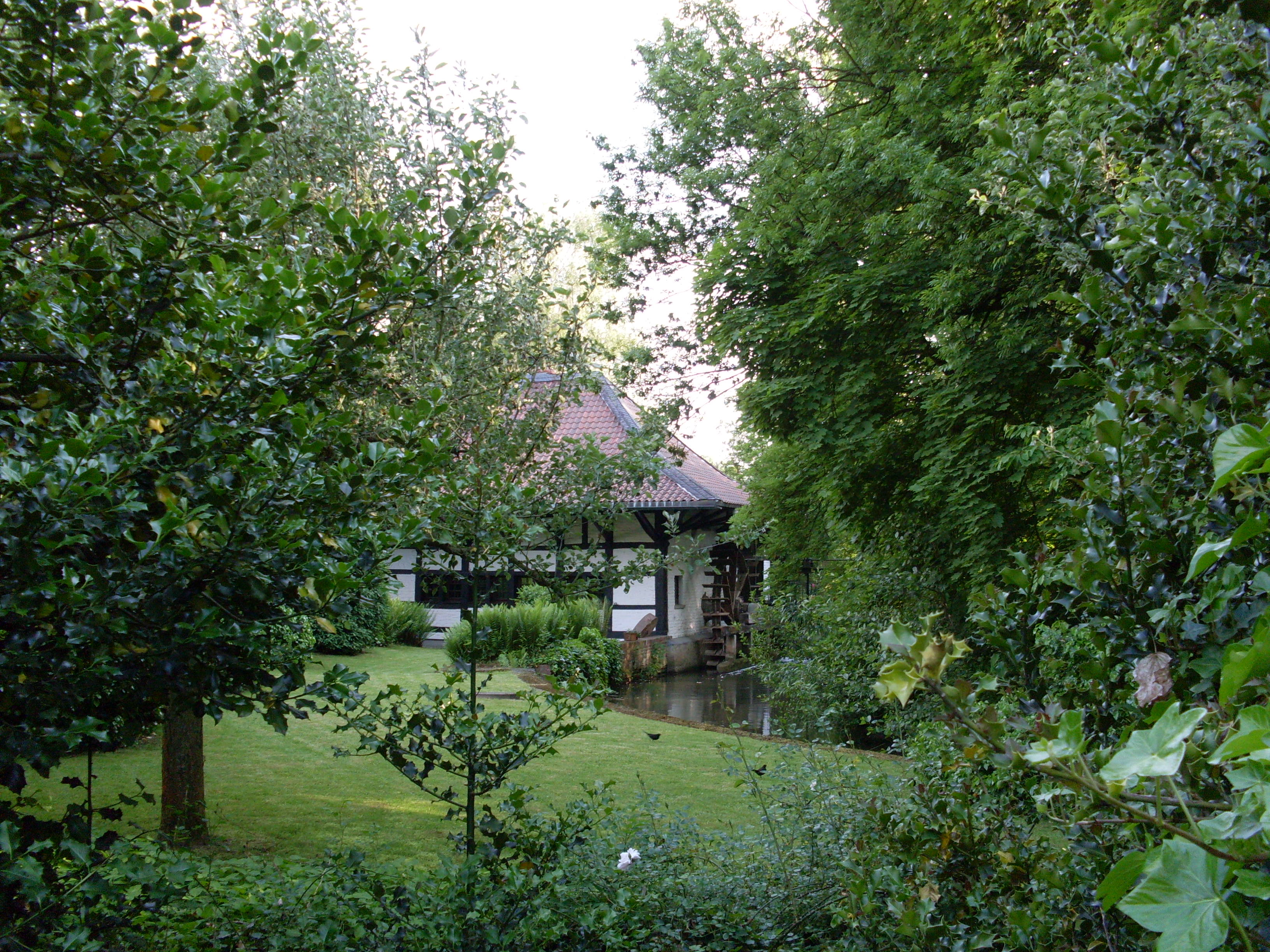
Old Mill
