= Kaiserswerth =

City district of Düsseldorf, Germany

Coordinates: 51°18′00″N 6°44′21″E

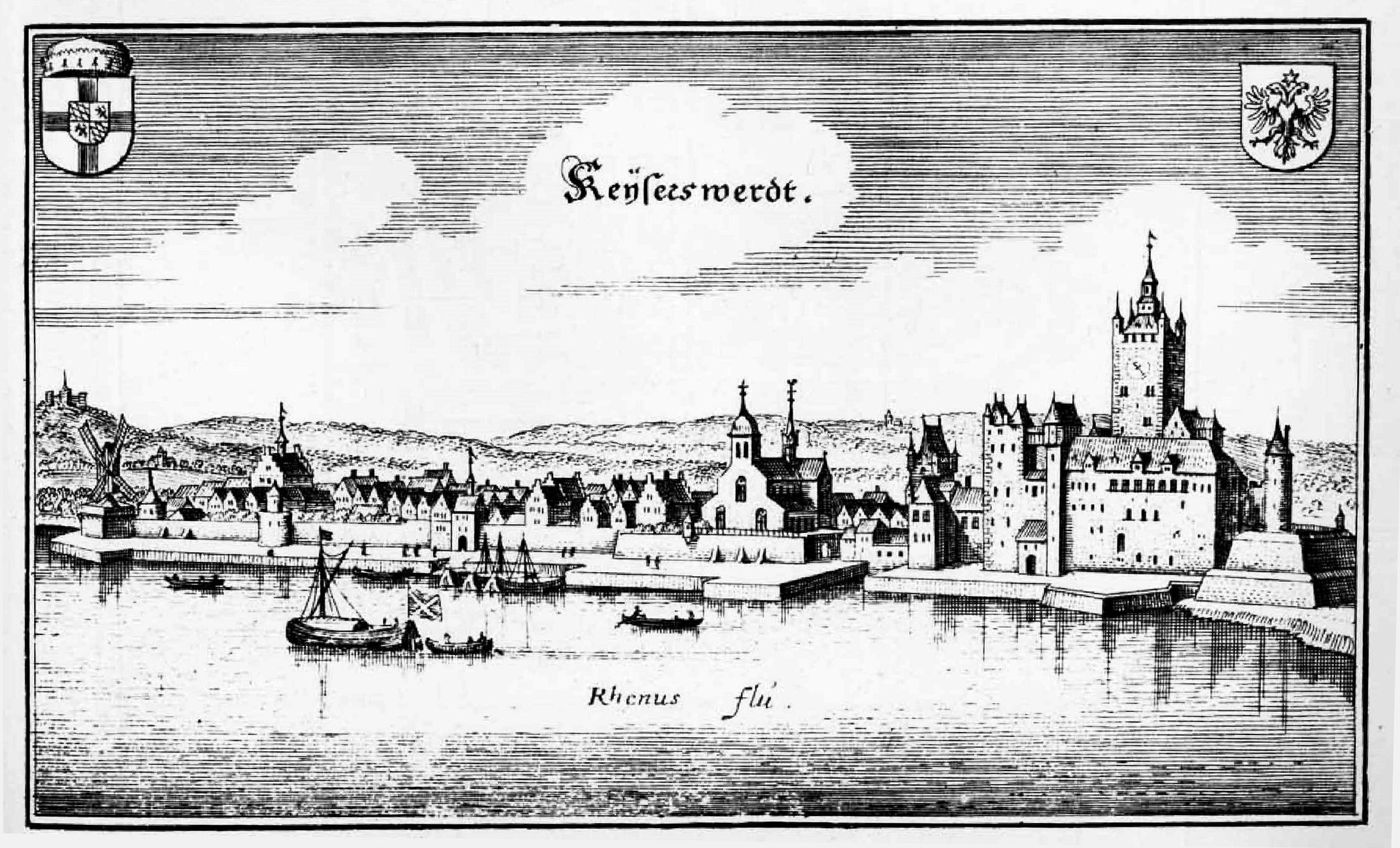
Kaiserswerth in 1646, engraving by Matthäus Merian.

Map of Düsseldorf, showing Kaiserswerth (in red) within Borough 5 (in pink).

Kaiserswerth (German: [ˌkaɪzɐsˈveːɐ̯t]) is one of the oldest quarters of the City of Düsseldorf, part of Borough 5. It is in the north of the city and next to the river Rhine. It houses the Kaiserwerth Deaconesses' Institute where Florence Nightingale worked. Kaiserswerth has an area of 4.80 km^{2} (1.85 sq mi), and 7,923 inhabitants (2020).

== History ==
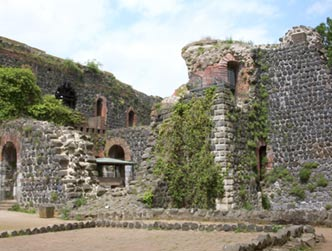
Ruin of the Kaiserpfalz in Kaiserswerth.

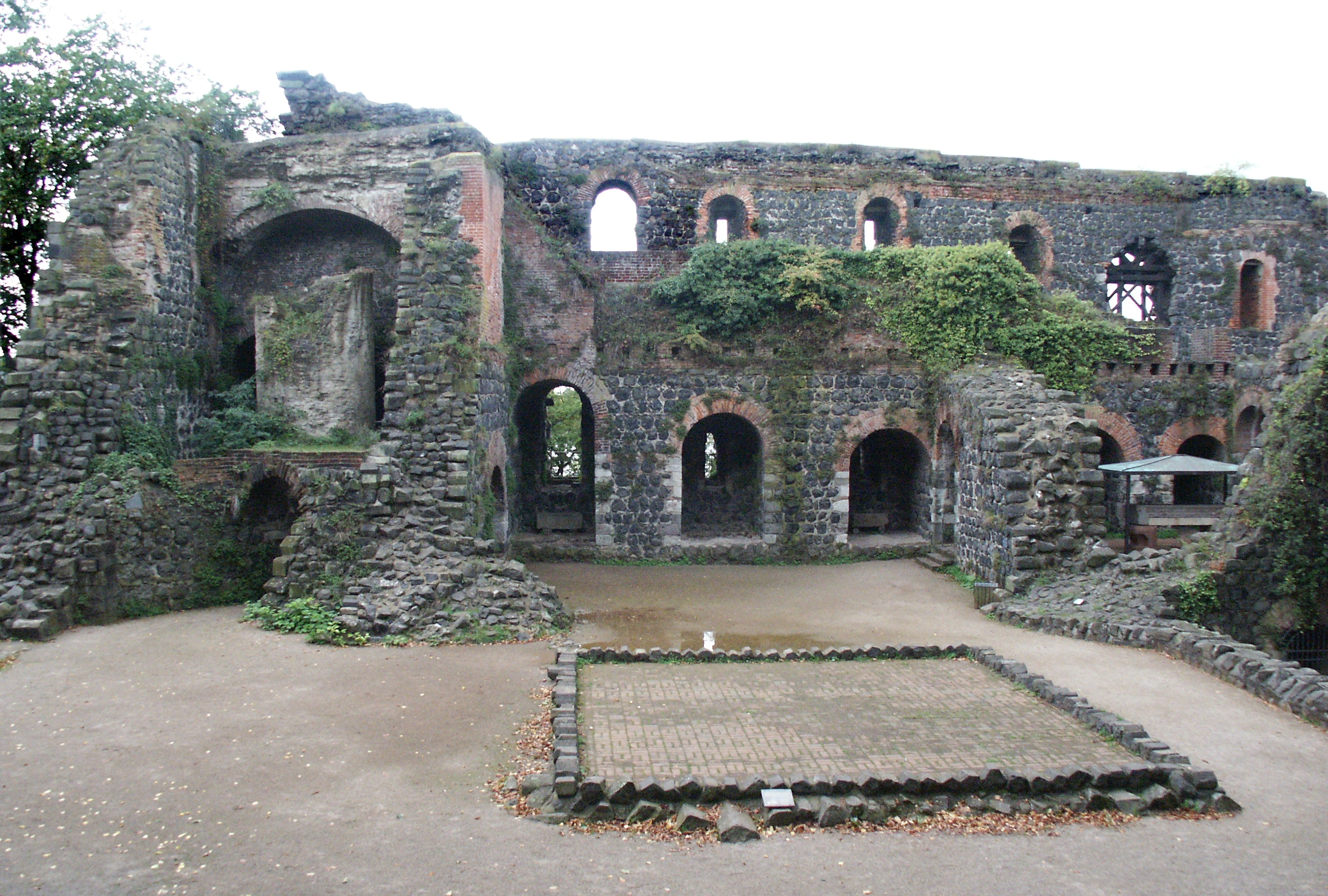

About the year 700 the monk Saint Suitbert founded a Benedictine abbey at Werth, a river island that formed an important crossing point of the Rhine. The abbey was destroyed 88 years later. On that area there is now the "Erzbischöfliches Suitbertus-Gymnasium", an archiepiscopal secondary school with the old chapel and parts of the abbey. The former monastery garden is a meeting point for the upper school between lesson times.

The Kaiserpfalz which is a general term for a temporary seat of the Holy Roman Emperor was built at an unknown date but before the year 1016. In 1062, the archbishop of Cologne, Anno II, kidnapped the underage German King Heinrich IV from here and in this way obtained the unofficial regency of the Holy Roman Empire. At this time the island's name changed from Werth to Kaiserswerth. In 1174, Friederick I Barbarossa moved the Rhine customs collection to Kaiserswerth. The eastern branch of the Rhine around the island silted up connecting Kaiserswerth to the east bank of the river. In 1273, the emperor pledged Kaiserswerth to the Archbishop of Cologne forming a de facto enclave within the Duchy of Jülich-Berg. In 1591, Friedrich Spee von Langenfeld was born in Kaiserswerth.

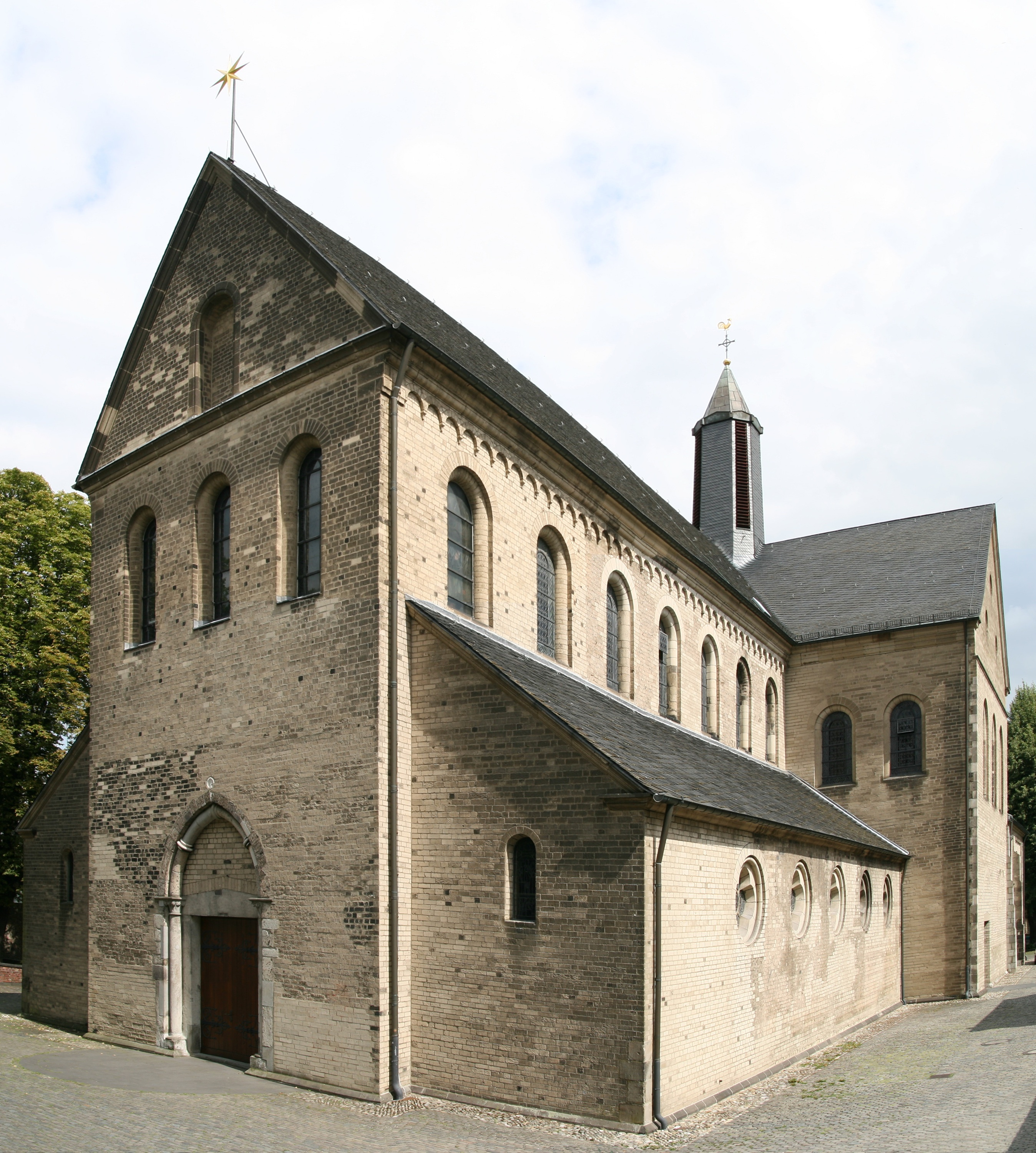

Due to its strategic position the town changed hands regularly. The town was captured in 1586 during the Cologne War, and then occupied by the Spanish from 1589 to 1592. In 1636 the town was captured again by the forces of Hesse. When in 1688 the Elector of Cologne made an alliance with Louis XIV during the War of the Grand Alliance he gave the French access to the Rhine crossing at Kaiserswerth. This caused the Dutch and Brandenburg to lay siege to the town in the June 1689. The French garrison surrendered at the end of the month when their supplies were destroyed by fire. The French reoccupied Kaiserswerth in 1701 during the War of the Spanish Succession and the Allies laid siege to it again in 1702. After a long and hard struggle the town surrendered and the Alliance decided to demolish the fortifications.

In the 19th century Kaiserswerth was chiefly noted for its deaconess clinic, founded by local pastor Theodor Fliedner. Florence Nightingale worked there for some months meeting Paulina Irby. Another noted student was the Swedish Maria Cederschiöld, a pioneer of nursing in her country.

In both World Wars there was a great military hospital in Kaiserswerth.

Kaiserswerth became a part of Düsseldorf in 1929.

== Art in Kaiserswerth ==
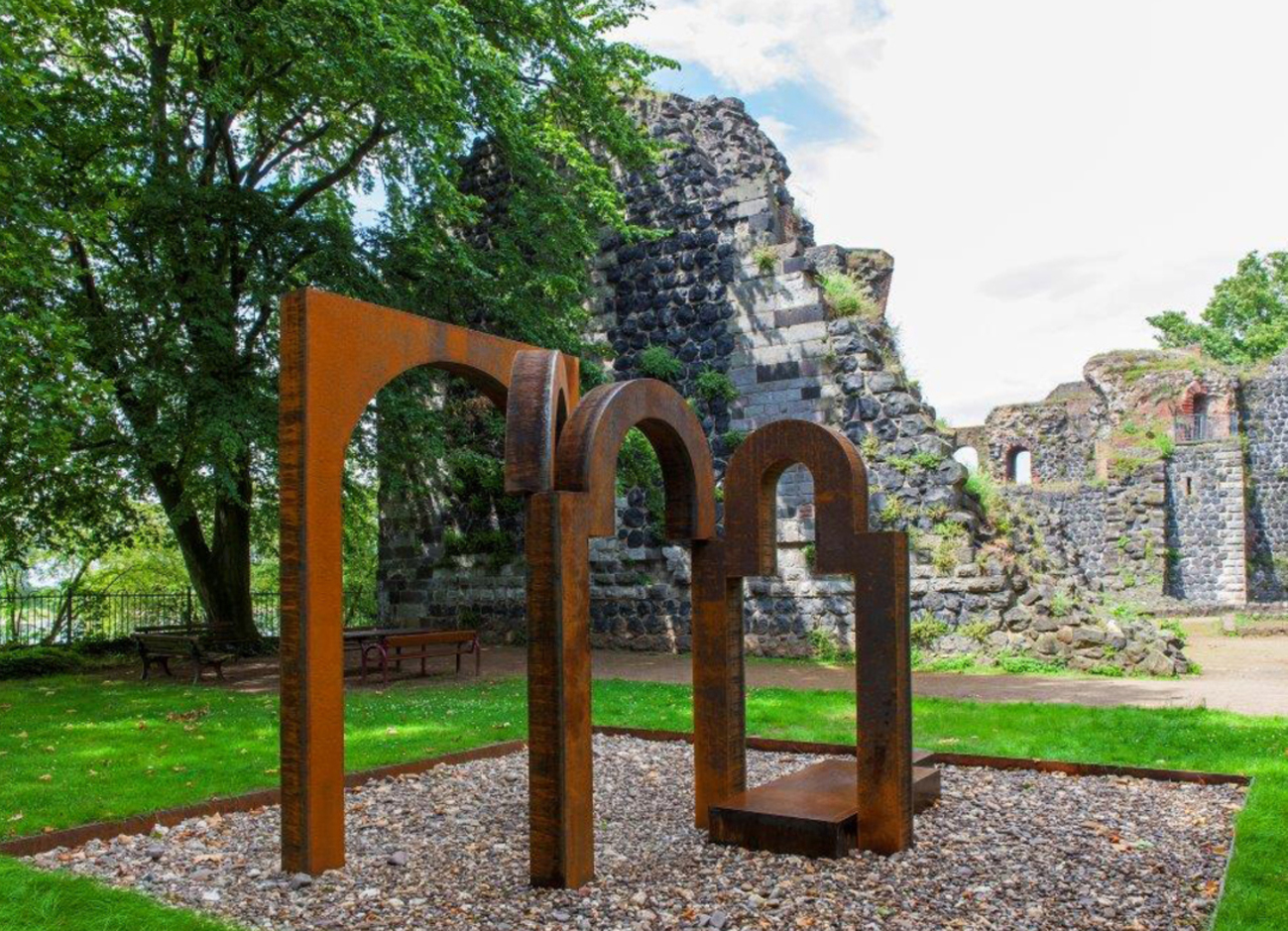
Im Kontext by Peter Schwickerath

Since 2001 an old school is home to the ″Kaiserswerth art archive″ (Kunstarchiv Kaiserswerth). Under the roof of Museum Kunstpalast the archive presents works of the collector Volker Kahmen, which mainly contains paintings by Bruno Goller who was Professor of the Kunstakademie Düsseldorf, and works of the photo-artists Bernd and Hilla Becher with their pioneering photography. In 2014 the sculptor Peter Schwickerath created the sculpture ″Im Kontext″ situated next to the Ruin of the Kaiserpfalz.

== Education ==
Kaserswerth is home to the Theodor Fliedner Gymnasium, one of Germany's largest protestant schools.

== Infrastructure ==
Kaiserswerth is connected to the central stations and the central districts of the cities of Düsseldorf and Duisburg by the metropolitan railway line U 79. There are some bus lines to other parts of Düsseldorf, to Mettmann, Krefeld, Ratingen and Düsseldorf Airport. There is a ferry crossing the Rhine over to Meerbusch

== Bibliography ==
- Christa-Maria Zimmermann / Hans Stöcker (Hrsg.), Edmund Spohr: Kayserswerth, 1300 Jahre, Heilige, Kaiser, Reformer. Herausgegeben im Auftrag der Landeshauptstadt Düsseldorf, Kulturamt. 2. durchgesehene Auflage. Triltsch Verlag, Düsseldorf 1981, ISBN 3-7998-0005-0
